= North-West Mounted Police =

Former Canadian police force

North-West Mounted Police Royal Northwest Mounted Police
- Modern rendering of the badge of the NWMP used from c. 1876 - 1903
- Abbreviation: NWMP, RNWMP
- Motto: Maintien le droit (Note: The motto was altered to read Maintiens le droit in 1915.) "To Maintain the Right"

Agency overview
- Formed: May 23, 1873
- Dissolved: 1920
- Superseding agency: Royal Canadian Mounted Police
- Legal personality: Government agency

Jurisdictional structure
- Federal agency (Operations jurisdiction): Canada
- Operations jurisdiction: North-West Territories, Canada
- Legal jurisdiction: As per operations jurisdiction
- Governing body: Government of Canada
- General nature: Federal law enforcement; Local civilian police

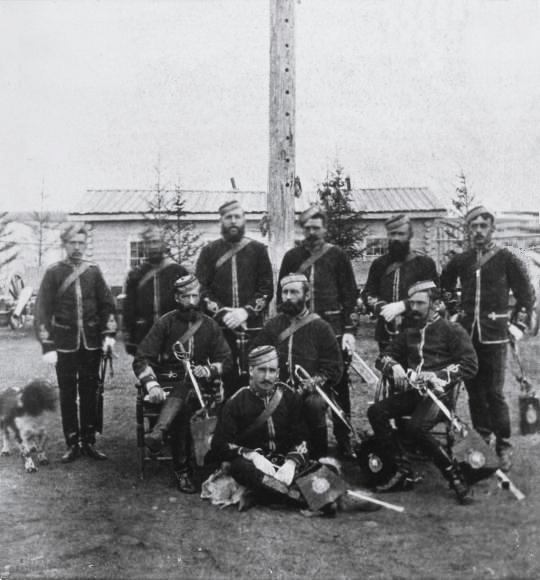
North-West Mounted Police officers, Fort Walsh, 1878; Commissioner James Macleod sat centre

The North-West Mounted Police (NWMP) was a Canadian paramilitary police force, established in 1873, to maintain order in the new Canadian North-West Territories (NWT) following the 1870 transfer of Rupert's Land and North-Western Territory from the Hudson's Bay Company to Canada. The Red River Rebellion and reports of lawlessness in the West, demonstrated by the subsequent Cypress Hills Massacre and fears of United States military incursions into Canada's new hinterland had pushed the Canada government to provide the means of enforcement of law and order. The NWMP, later renamed the Royal Canadian Mounted Police, combined military, police and judicial functions along similar lines to the Royal Irish Constabulary. A small, mobile police force was chosen as the best way to reduce potential for tensions with the United States and with First Nations. The NWMP uniforms included red coats deliberately reminiscent of British and Canadian military uniforms.

The NWMP was established by the Canadian government during the ministry of Prime Minister Sir John Macdonald who defined its purpose as "the preservation of peace and the prevention of crime" in the vast NWT. Macdonald envisioned the police force as a para-military force, writing that the "best force would be mounted riflemen, trained to act as cavalry... and styled police". Macdonald's principal fear was that the activities of American traders such as the Cypress Hills Massacre would lead to the First Nations peoples killing the American traders, which would lead to the United States military being deployed into the NWT to protect the lives of American citizens on the grounds that Canada was unable to maintain law and order in the region. Macdonald's greatest fear was that if the Americans occupied the NWT that they would not leave and the region would be annexed to the United States.

In 1874, the NWMP were deployed to the area of the present Alberta border. Their ill-planned and arduous journey of nearly 900 miles (1,400 km) became known as the March West and was portrayed as an epic journey of endurance. A separate group pressed northwest-wards to Edmonton. Over the next few years, the NWMP established a wide network of forts, posts and patrols and extended Canadian law across the region. The living conditions of the NWMP on the prairies were spartan and often uncomfortable, and only slowly improved over the course of the century.

By 1896, the government planned to pass policing responsibilities to the provinces and ultimately disband the NWMP. However, with the discovery of gold in the Klondike, the NWMP was redeployed to protect Canada's sovereignty over the region and to manage the influx of prospectors. NWMP volunteers were sent to fight in the Second Boer War and, in recognition for their sacrifice during the war and for 30 years of service policing the North-West and Yukon Territories, King Edward VII, granted the force permission to use the prefix Royal, making them the Royal Northwest Mounted Police (RNWMP) in 1904. Plans for disbanding the Royal North-West Mounted Police were abandoned in the face of popular oppositions and regional politicians. Large numbers of the RNWMP volunteered for military service during the First World War and the future of the badly depleted force was once again in doubt. Towards the end of the war, however, fears grew about a potential Bolshevik conspiracy and the authorities tasked the RNWMP to investigate the threat. In the aftermath of the violence of the Winnipeg General Strike, the government amalgamated the RNWMP and Dominion Police, to form the modern Royal Canadian Mounted Police (RCMP) in 1920.

== History ==
=== Background ===
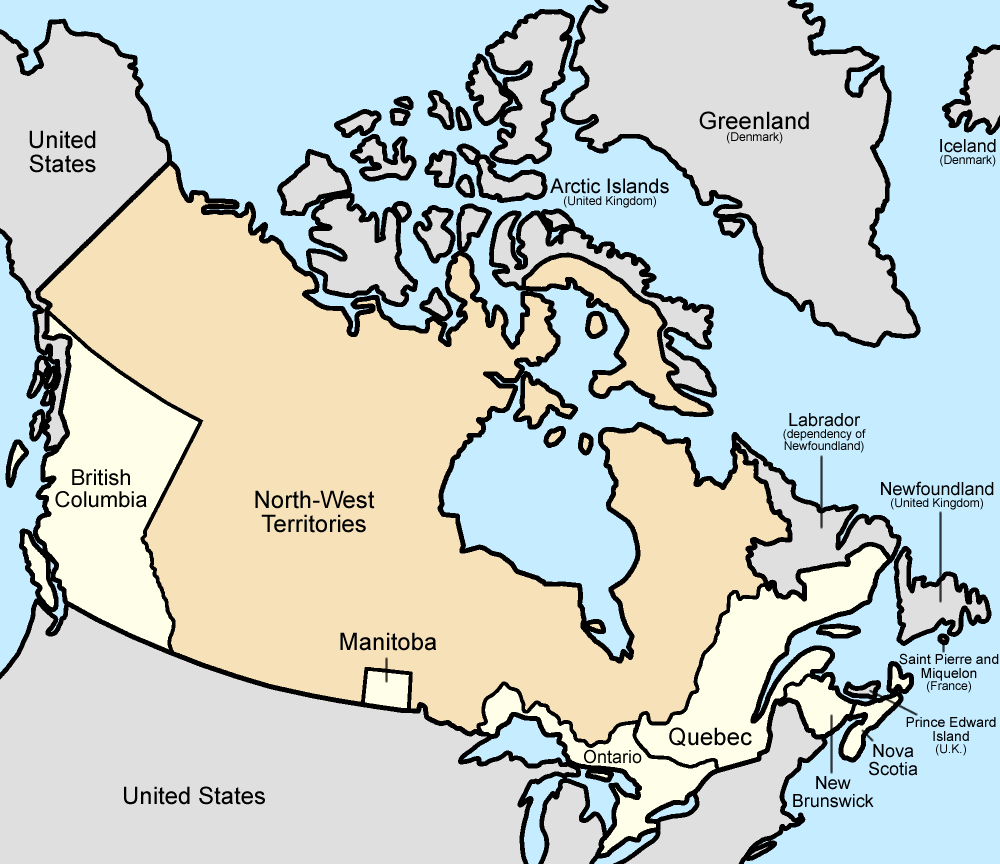
Map showing the westwards expansion of Canada in 1870

The NWMP was created due to the expansion of the newly formed Dominion of Canada into the NWT during the 1870s. The Dominion had been formed in 1867 by the confederation of the British colonies of Canada, Nova Scotia and New Brunswick, but the extensive lands to the north-west known as Rupert's Land remained governed by the Hudson's Bay Company as a proprietary colony. The new Dominion government was keen to expand westwards, in part due to fears that the United States might annex the region. It agreed to purchase the company's lands in exchange for £300,000 and various grants of land, adding around 2,500,000 square miles (6,500,000 km^{2}) of territory to the Dominion in 1870.

The NWT varied geographically from the extreme conditions of the far north, through to the edges of the Great Plains in the south, covered by flat, semi-arid grasslands. A rocky area known as the Shield, which was unsuitable for arable farming, had formed a natural barrier to European colonists gradually spreading across from the eastern colonies. As a result, the territories remained thinly populated, with only around 150,000 First Nations, Inuit and occasional small groups of Europeans, and more substantial communities of around 12,000 Métis settled in the Red River valley of Manitoba and a further 8,500 European settlers in the colony of British Columbia. Surveys referred to the territories as the "Wild North Land" and the "Great Lone Land".

The Canadian border along the southern edge of Alberta was occupied by the Blackfoot Confederacy, a First Nation whose economy was based on hunting bison. The Blackfoot had suffered badly from smallpox, and were under increasing pressure from rival groups of Sioux and Piegans that had crossed into Canada, fleeing the expansion of the United States military across the southern plains. Whisky-traders from the United States had come across the border, selling alcohol to the indigenous peoples, fuelling social problems and outbreaks of violence. Although the region remained relatively safe, there was no civil government, and military explorers highlighted the "lawlessness" and lack of "security for life or property" that resulted from the absence of a formal justice system.

In 1869, the government of John A. Macdonald, made plans to create a 200-strong mounted police force to maintain order along the border; such a force, he thought, would enable the colonization of the region and be much cheaper than deploying regular militia units for the task. The implementation of this proposal was delayed, however, first by the rebellion of the Métis, and then by the threat of a Fenian invasion. Meanwhile, a survey conducted in 1871 by Lieutenant William Butler recommended establishing a mounted force of up to 150 men under a magistrate or commissioner, based along the northern trade routes, leaving the border area as a liminal, ungarrisoned zone. Colonel Patrick Robertson-Ross conducted another survey in 1872, and recommended an alternative strategy of recruiting a larger force of 550 men who would be tasked to push south into the border region itself and establish law and order there.

=== Establishment (1873–1874) ===
==== Formation ====
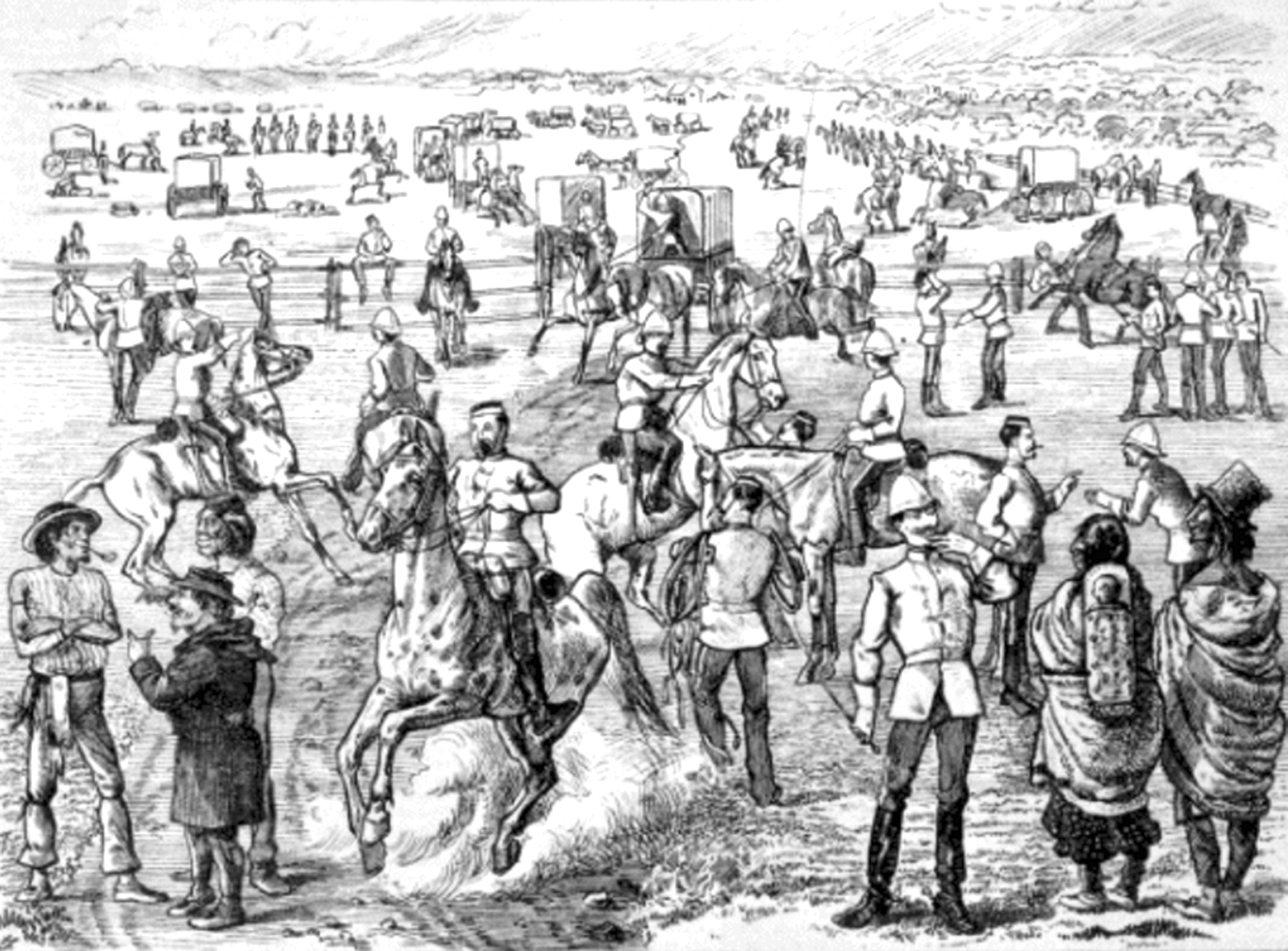
Mounted police preparing to leave Fort Dufferin in 1874, depicted by Henri Julien

Macdonald acquired approval for his new force on May 23, 1873, after Parliament, following a cursory debate, passed the Mounted Police Act into law unopposed. At this point, Macdonald appears to have intended to create a force of mounted police to watch "the frontier from Manitoba to the foot of the Rocky Mountains", probably with its headquarters in Winnipeg. He was heavily influenced by the model of the Royal Irish Constabulary, which combined aspects of a traditional military unit with the judicial functions of the magistrates' courts, and believed that the new force should be able to provide a local system of government in otherwise ungoverned areas. Originally, Macdonald also had wanted to form units of Métis policemen, commanded by white Canadian officers in a similar manner to the British Indian Army, but he was forced to abandon this approach after the Red River Rebellion of 1870 called their loyalty into question.

In June 1873, around 30 members of the Assiniboine First Nation were killed in the Cypress Hills Massacre, creating a national furore. In response, Macdonald used a Privy Council order to enact the new legislation, formally creating the NWMP with the intention of mobilizing the force and deploying it early the next year. A report then arrived from Alexander Morris, the Lieutenant Governor of the North-West Territories, blaming the massacre on the activities of whisky traders at Fort Whoop-Up; Morris predicted that if action was not taken immediately, there would be a major uprising by the First Nations across the region, into which the United States might choose to intervene. Macdonald was not entirely convinced by the governor's analysis, but nonetheless he agreed to recruit 150 men and send them west to Lower Fort Garry before winter weather blocked the route.

Macdonald's Conservative government then fell from power as a result of the Pacific Scandal, and was replaced by the Liberal administration of Alexander Mackenzie, who placed more credence on Morris's reports and had his own moral concerns about the whisky trade. These worries were amplified by calls from Washington for Ottawa to secure the frontier and so prevent American Indians from purchasing whisky in Canada. Mackenzie initially suggested sending a joint Canadian-United States military expedition, but, after the Governor General and others noted the serious implications of inviting the United States Army to deploy into Canadian territory, he instead agreed to deploy the new mounted police to carry out the operation. Another 150 men were recruited in eastern Canada and sent west by rail through the United States to rendezvous with the first part of the force at Fort Dufferin.

==== March West ====
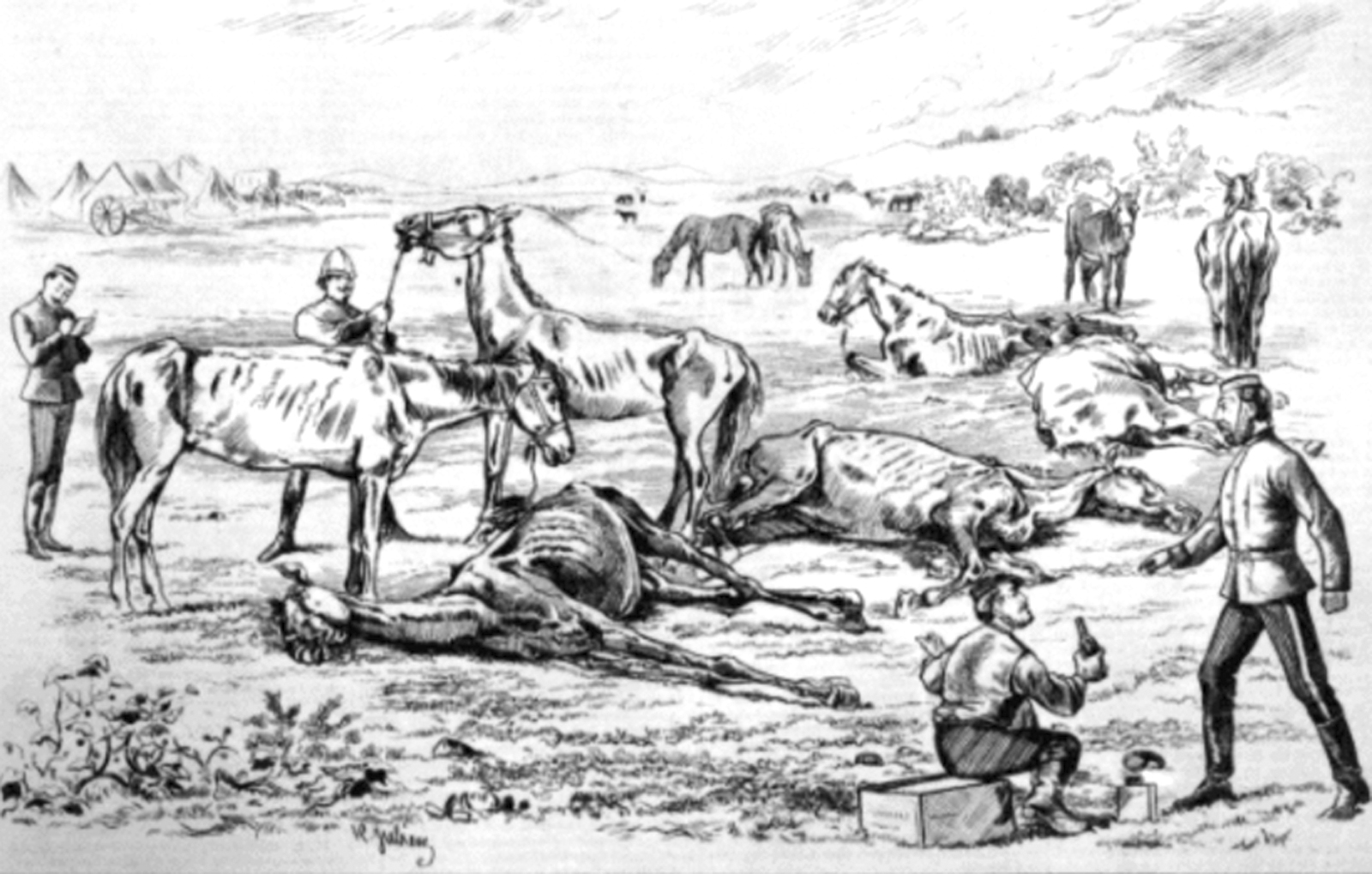
Mounted police in Dead Horse Valley in 1874, depicted by Henri Julien

The mounted police's deployment onto the plains in 1874 became known as the "March West". The commissioner of the new force, Colonel George French, was ordered to proceed west from Fort Dufferin to deal with what the authorities described as the "band of desperadoes" around Fort Whoop-Up, before then dispersing his force to establish police posts stretching across the territories. From Fort Dufferin, French could have simply traced the southern line of the frontier, following a well-established trail created two years before by the British and United States Boundary Commission. Lieutenant Governor Morris disagreed with this approach, arguing that it might encourage an attack by the Sioux, who he believed were gathering in the United States to attack across the border, and urged the government to send the police via a more northerly route.

Following instructions from Ottawa, French finally agreed with Morris that the expedition would initially follow the trail, but then would steer away from the border and Sioux territory, and the mounted police finally left Dufferin on July 8, 1874. The 275-strong expedition was divided into six divisions, supported by 310 horses, 143 draught oxen and 187 Red River carts and wagons, in all stretching out 1.5 miles (2.4 km) along the track. The force took two 9-pounder (4 kg) guns and two mortars for additional protection, cattle for food, and mowing machines to make hay. French had negotiated that the expedition be accompanied by Henri Julien, a journalist whom the commissioner hoped would write a positive account of the new force. The expedition made slow time along the boundary trail, progressing only 15 miles (24 km) a day at most. The police were already travelling under unpleasant and arduous conditions, made more difficult by the teamsters having little experience and their horses being unsuitable for draught work.

On July 29, the main force then turned off the trail and headed across the much drier and rougher prairies to the north-west. The police had no water bottles and soon both their food and water ran out; as the weather worsened, their horses began to die. When the force arrived at what they thought was Fort Whoop-Up at the junction of the Bow and South Saskatchewan rivers on September 10, there was nothing to be seen, as the fort was in fact around 75 miles (121 km) away. The police had expected the area to contain good grazing for their horses but it was barren and treeless. French was forced to abandon the plan to head to Whoop-Up and instead travelled 70 miles (110 km) south towards the border, where supplies could be purchased from the United States. Yet more horses died from the cold and hunger, and many of the men were barefoot and in rags by the time they arrived, having travelled a total of nearly 900 miles (1,400 km).

After resupplying, French led some of his force back east, leaving Assistant Commissioner James Macleod to advance on Fort Whoop-Up with the three remaining divisions, approximately 150 men. When the police reached the fort on October 9, they were prepared for a confrontation, but the whisky traders were aware that they were approaching and had long since moved on. The force received new orders from Ottawa to garrison the area and settled down to build Fort Macleod on an island in Old Man's River. The expedition had been badly planned and executed, and almost failed; the historian William Baker describes it as "a monumental fiasco of poor planning, ignorance, incompetence, and cruelty to men and beasts". (Note: Early historians of the force stressed the epic nature of the expedition. The popular historian Arthur Haydon, for example, scorned the newspaper accounts which blamed the officers and men as "incapable", "inexperienced" and "careless", arguing that the march was "truly one of the most extraordinary on record", of which "all Canadians might well feel proud. By 1955, however, the historian Paul Sharp had suggested that the March West almost failed due to "misinformation, inexperience and ignorance" and criticism of the force's performance intensified after 1973. Ronald Atkin concludes that the expedition was "epic in its lack of organization, in the poor way in which it was conducted and its incredibly close brush with disaster", Daniel Francis condemns it as "a fiasco of bad planning", with R. C. Macleod observing that "the difficulties of the Long March...were largely self-inflicted".) Nonetheless, it rapidly became portrayed by the force as epic story of bravery, endurance and determination.

=== Early years (1874–1895) ===
==== Relations with First Nations ====
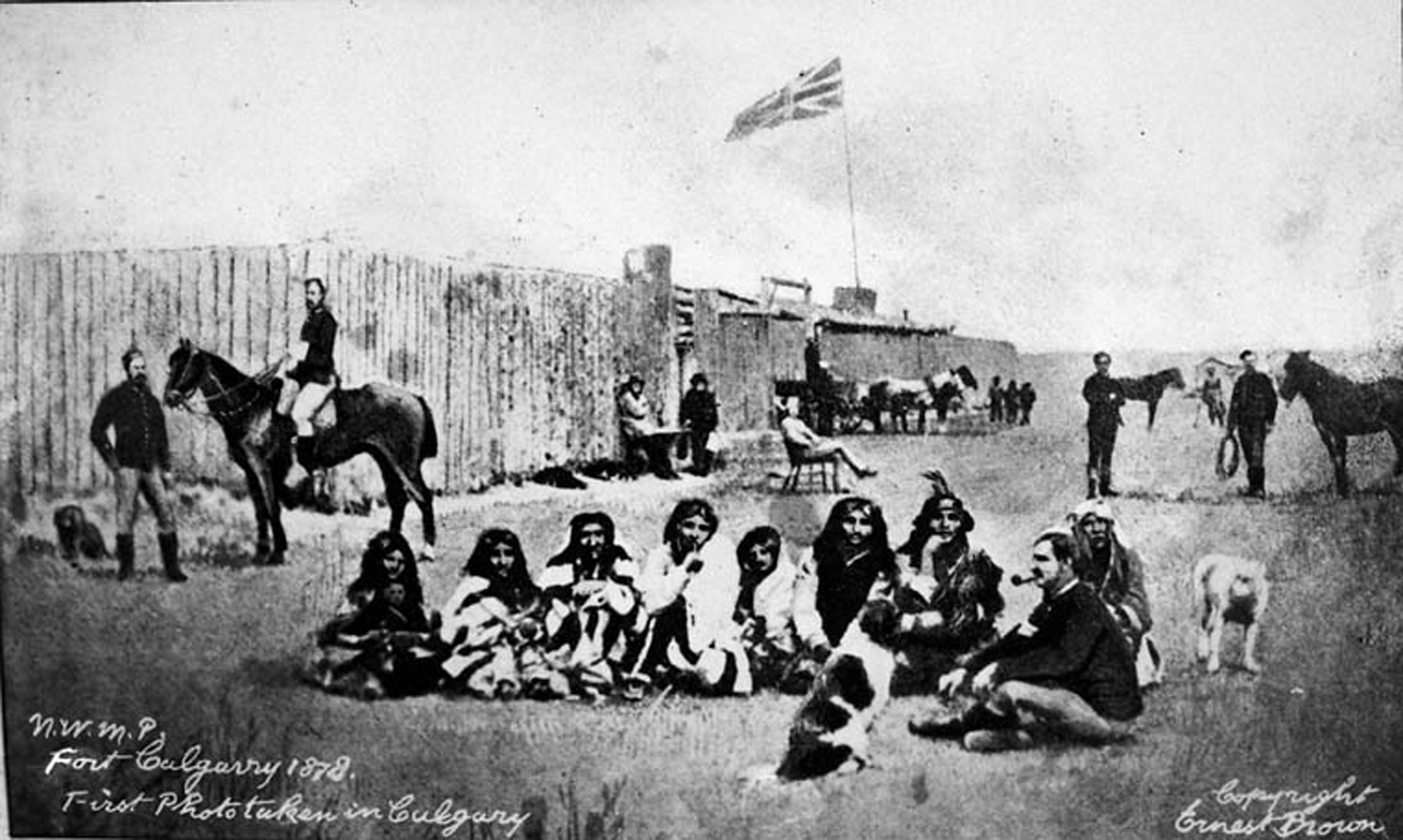
Mounted police and members of the Blackfoot First Nation at Fort Calgary, 1878

With the arrival of the mounted police, the whisky trade around Fort Macleod collapsed, and the traders shifted into legitimate projects or moved elsewhere. The Blackfoot welcomed the arrival of the police and their leader, Crowfoot, promoted a policy of co-operation. After enduring a difficult winter with only limited supplies, the force broke up their main command, some remaining at Fort Macleod, with others establishing forts at Dufferin, Swan River, Edmonton, Winnipeg and Ellice, with Walsh and Calgary following soon after. Macdonald's newly returned Conservative government was critical of the way that the Liberals had stood up the force, ordering an inspection in 1875 that concluded that "for a newly-raised force, hastily enrolled and equipped, it is in very fair order", but recommended a variety of improvements, including to the quality of the commissioned officers. Commissioner French was forced to resign the following year, and was replaced by James Macleod.

Meanwhile, the frontier was changing rapidly, with large cattle ranches being established across the Canadian plains. The government also introduced a new Indian Policy, seeking to sign treaties with the First Nations, establish reserves and a system of annuities, which would then hopefully be followed by the integration of the First Nations into the agricultural economy. The mounted police's approach to enabling this process has been characterized by the historian Ronald Atkin as a "benevolent despotism", and by John Jennings as a "legal tyranny". The police insisted that the Canadian law should be applied rigidly to the First Nations, but at the same time were relatively supportive of the First Nations when responding to the claims of the growing number of white ranchers. The force built cordial personal relationships with the First Nations' leaders, which led to a much lower level of violence between the government and indigenous peoples than in the United States. That the NWMP had evicted the American whisky traders whose sales had led to alcoholism becoming a serious problem was greatly appreciated by the First Nations peoples. The Blackfoot chief Crowfoot in 1877 stated: "The Mounted Police protected us as the feathers of the bird protect it from the frosts of winter". The fact that the NWMP arrested whites accused of killing First Nations peoples led to the perception among First Nations peoples that the NWMP was high-handed, but fair.

The herds of buffalo migrated elsewhere on the plains in 1876 and starvation among the Blackfoot loomed. Crowfoot rejected a proposed alliance with the Sioux against the United States, arguing that the collapse of buffalo hunting and white immigration meant that his people needed a long-term alliance with the mounted police. Formal negotiations between the Canadian government and the Blackfoot began in 1877, with Macleod representing Queen Victoria. The resulting Treaty 7 established reserves for the Blackfoot, in exchange for gratuities and the promise of annuities. The Department of Indian Affairs was created to govern the reserves, supported by the police. By 1879, the last of the Canadian buffalo herds had been eliminated by hunting, and the Indians became dependent on supplies issued by the police to avoid starvation.

At the same time, the police were managing the Sitting Bull incident. In 1876 the United States military led a campaign against the Sioux in Dakota; the Sioux's leader, Sitting Bull, concluded that the conflict was unwinnable, and chose to seek sanctuary in Canada. Sitting Bull arrived in May the following year and, by the summer, around 5,600 Sioux had crossed the border despite opposition from the Blackfoot. The mounted police helped to facilitate the negotiations with the Sioux, in which Assistant Commissioner Acheson Irvine played a prominent part. The Sioux declined to return south, however, and the police had to deploy around 200 men to Fort Walsh to oversee the immigrant community. The police lived in primitive conditions and voluntarily shared some of their own supplies with the Sioux, who were not covered by Treaty 7 and therefore ineligible for government support. Nonetheless, starvation gradually forced the return of most of the newcomers to the United States, and Sitting Bull himself finally surrendered in 1881.

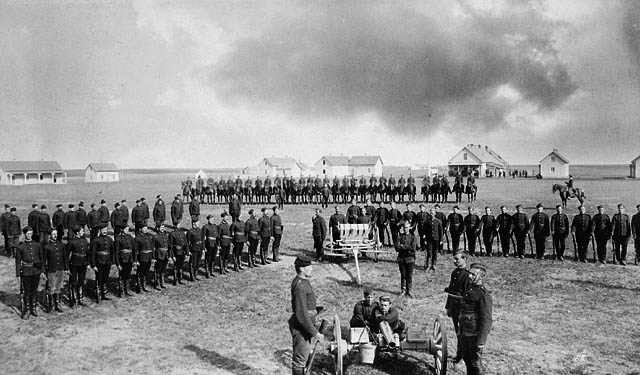
NWMP Barracks, Regina, Assiniboia, NWT, with 7-pounder gun, 1885

Initially, the police focused their law enforcement efforts on dealing with the illegal consumption of alcohol, which was considered to promote violent behaviour among the First Nations. By the 1880s, however, the police also began to tackle horse theft. Horse stealing was common among the First Nations on the prairies: it formed part of intertribal competition and warfare, and the stolen horses enabled their hunting expeditions. In part the police crackdown was driven by the Department for Indian Affairs, who believed that the practice of horse theft was slowing the assimilation of the First Nations into broader Canadian society. The authorities were also concerned that if the First Nations were allowed to steal horses from across the border in the United States, it could provoke a military intervention into Canada.

From 1885 onward, the NWMP was charged with the enforcing the apartheid-like pass system, under which a First Nations person was permitted to leave a reservation only with a pass issued by the local Indian agent and had to return by the time the pass expired. The pass system was brought in as a temporary measure during the North-West Rebellion, but was then made permanent as the government found it a useful means of social control. The NWMP knew that the pass system had no basis in the law and in fact violated Treaty 7 with the Blackfoot, which promised that the Blackfoot people would be permitted go whatever they liked. The Indians often ignored the pass system, and in May 1893 Commissioner Herchmer ordered the NWMP to stop enforcing the pass system, saying it was illegal under Canadian law, only to be overruled by the Department of Indian Affairs. It was the intention of the Canadian government to colonize the Prairies, and the government believed that settlers would not come unless there were assurances that the First Nations peoples were under control, hence the pass system.

==== Construction of the Canadian Pacific Railway ====
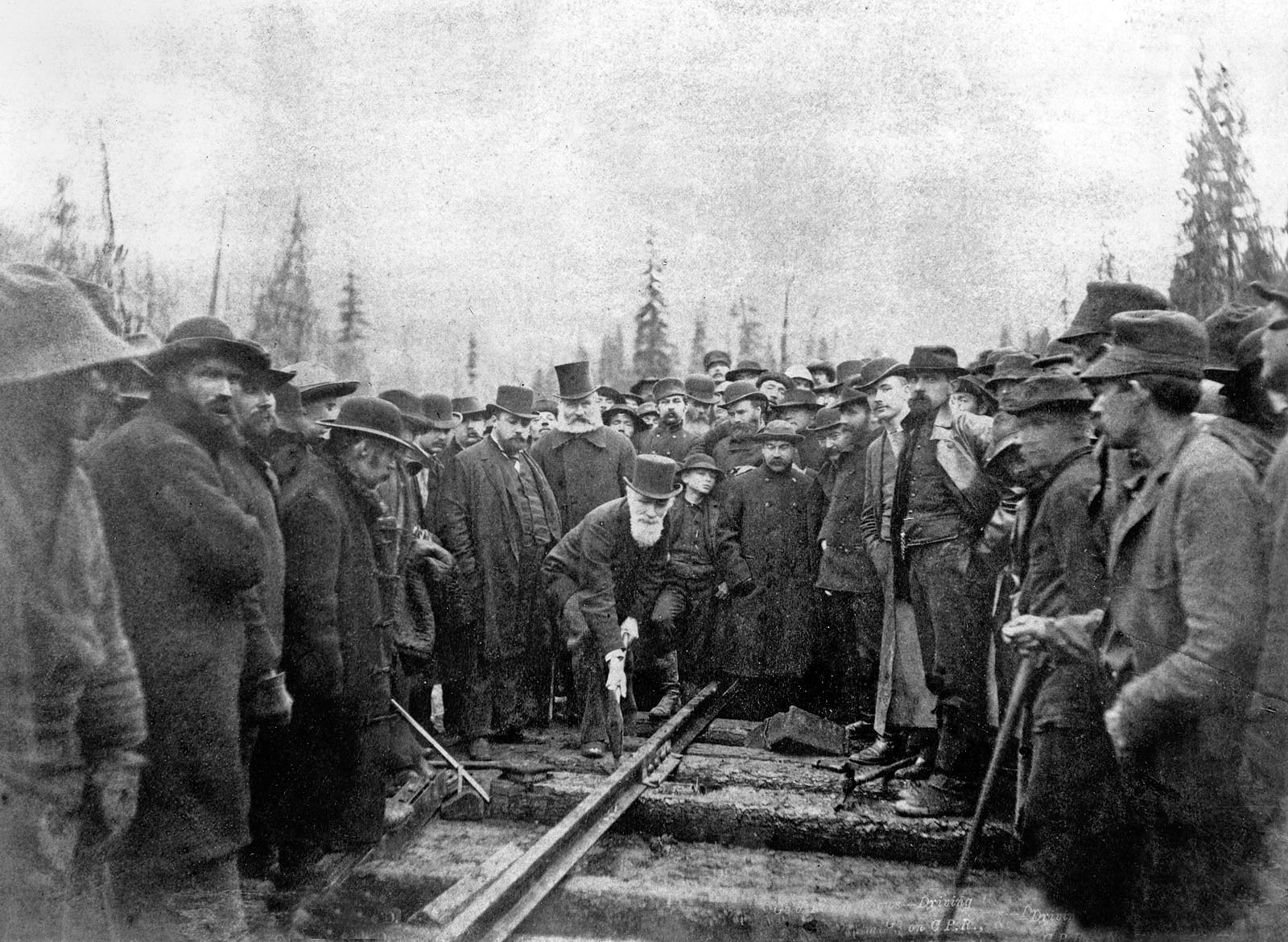
Donald Smith driving the last spike of the Canadian Pacific Railway in 1885; Sam Steele of the mounted police stands third right from Smith

The Canadian government began the construction of the Canadian Pacific Railway between eastern Canada and British Columbia in 1881, with the aim of opening up the north-western territories for settlement. In response, the mounted police moved their headquarters to the town of Regina, the new territorial capital which had been founded alongside the railway line. The force was increased in size to 500 in 1882 to cope with the increased tasks being demanded of it, and the police began to use the railway to bring in recruits more easily from the eastern provinces.

The mounted police took on a range of tasks associated with the new project. Teams of police escorted the construction teams as they moved across the Rocky Mountains, having been given special jurisdiction over the area along the line of the route. They enforced the liquor laws, and oversaw the itinerant service workers who accompanied the main construction teams. They defused many of the tensions involving the construction workers and the company, including intervening to resolve cases where the workers had not been paid by the company as promised, but they also intervened to support the railway company. When the railway staff went on strike for higher wages in 1883, the mounted police guarded the company's trains, escorted in new drivers and, when necessary, drove the locomotives themselves; two years later the police broke up a protest over unpaid wages by over a thousand construction workers, arresting the main leaders. The head of the Canadian Pacific Railway, William Van Horne, thanked the force for its contribution to the final completion of the project.

The construction of the railway introduced new tensions between the government and the First Nations. The authorities wished to move the indigenous peoples to reserves north of the railway in order to cut them off from the United States border. For their part, the First Nations were unhappy about the railway being built through their lands, stole company horses and disrupted the construction work. The mounted police made arrests and the government reduced their rations: by 1883, the threat of starvation had forced the First Nations to relocate to the northern side of the line.

==== North-West Rebellion ====
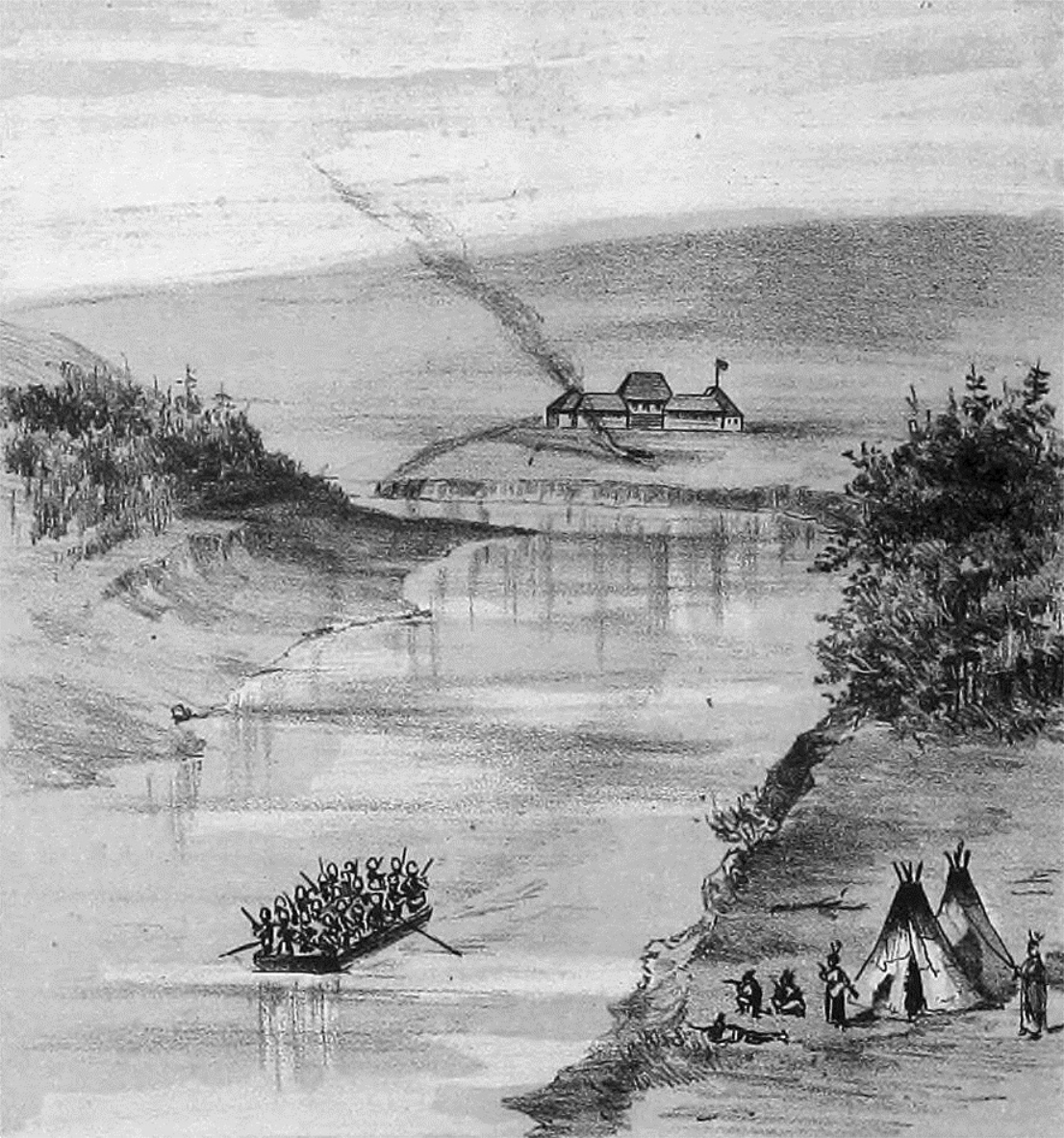
Contemporary depiction of Inspector Francis Dickens and his men evacuating Fort Pitt, 1885

In 1885, the North-West Rebellion broke out along the North Saskatchewan River valley. Driven by a combination of political and economic issues, Louis Riel and his Métis followers intended to form a provisional government, gain the support of the Cree First Nation, defeat the mounted police and seize the region, forcing the Canadian government to the negotiation table. There had been worries among the police about potential instability since the previous fall, and the force had increased its presence in the area over the winter. As tensions rose, Irvine, who had replaced Macleod as Commissioner in 1880 after accusations of financial mismanagement, began to mobilize any spare police manpower in Regina, bringing the force up to an operational strength of 562.

When the rebellion finally broke out in Batoche in March, Irvine advanced quickly through the snow from Regina to Prince Albert, which he garrisoned with 90 police. Superintendent Leif Crozier took a force of police, civilian volunteers and a 7-pounder (3 kg) gun to Fort Carlton and attempted to seize a cache of supplies. In the process, Crozier confronted a larger force of rebels at Duck Lake, where his detachment came off much worse in the resulting fight. Emboldened, some of the Cree leaders, including Poundmaker and Big Bear, now joined the Métis in their revolt, although others continued to tacitly support the government, in part the result of the good relationship the police had built up with them. The police rapidly abandoned most of their posts along the valley, falling back to more easily defensible locations; Inspector Francis Dickens was forced to flee Fort Pitt with his men on a makeshift boat.

Meanwhile, more than 5,000 militia (the nascent Canadian army after the departure of British troops) commanded by Major-General Frederick Middleton hurried west along the Canadian Pacific Railway. Middleton split his forces into three groups and led the main column, intending to retake Batoche. The second column advanced to Battleford and then marched south to Cut Knife Creek, with 74 mounted police forming the advance guard. There the column surprised Poundmakers's camp, but the attack by the advance troops failed and the government forces were forced to retreat. After many delays, Middleton finally attacked the rebel capital, winning the Battle of Batoche and forcing Riel to surrender, before relieving Prince Albert on May 20. The third column marched to Edmonton, supported by 20 mounted police and their 9-pounder (4 kg) gun, where the government captured Big Bear and the remnants of the rebel Cree. Riel was imprisoned by the mounted police at Regina, given a short trial, and hanged.

Middleton criticized Irvine and the mounted police for having remained in Prince Albert throughout the campaign, and for failing to reinforce him during the Battle of Batoche. The general recommended closing the force, and replacing it with a corps of mounted infantry. He publicly likened the police to "gophers", who had retreated and hid during the fighting, and his complaints were picked up by the press. Irvine was criticized in the media for his lack of vigour and, lacking the support of the prime minister, he resigned the next year and was replaced by Lawrence Herchmer. In turn, Irvine complained about Crozier's behaviour and "the impetuosity displayed by both the police and volunteers" at Duck Lake; when the details became public, Crozier resigned. (Note: Early historians defended the performance of the mounted police, noting that the force was mostly under the command of the militia and General Middleton himself, and were not given opportunities to show their value in battle. Later historians have been more critical, R. C. Macleod, for example, noting that Irvine's failure to reinforce Middleton "can only be explained by excessive caution...or by his ignorance of what was happening on his doorstep". Stanley Horrall blames the poor performance by the police on a combination of the government's neglect of the mounted police and the weak leadership shown by Commissioner Irvine in the years running up to the rebellion.)

==== Operations on the prairies ====
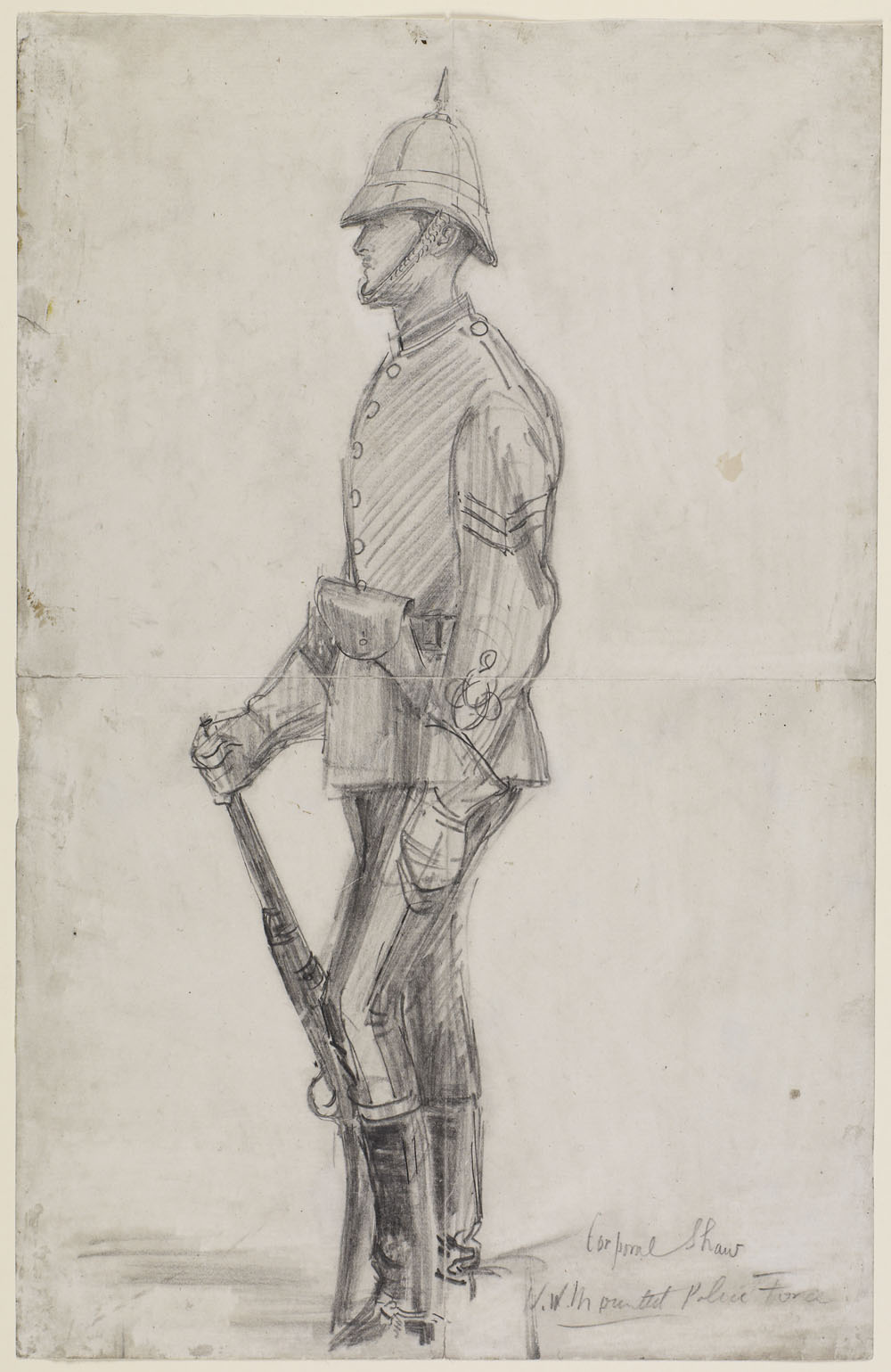
Sketch of Corporal Shaw by Sidney Hall, 1881, wearing dress uniform

In the years after the rebellion, the government's National Policy to settle the north-west continued; by 1885, white settlers became the majority in the region as the railway brought in immigrants, and their numbers almost doubled over the course of the 1890s. The establishment of the mounted police was increased to 1,000 men in the aftermath of the rebellion, officially in order to cope with the growing white population, but also to prevent any future uprising by the Métis and First Nations. Levels of crime were initially low, with the police's implementation of the law relatively informal, and focused on upholding the spirit, rather than the letter, of the law, but the force soon faced new challenges as the population grew.

Cattle ranchers had moved into the territories within a year of the police arriving, initially clustering around the police posts for protection. The government began to promote the development of the large ranches during the 1870s and early 1880s, enclosing land up to 100,000 acres (40,000 ha) in size and excluding smaller farmers. The police had close links to the ranch owners, and many of the first recruits had gone on to become ranchers themselves after leaving the force. (Note: The Canadian ranch owners were often of Anglo-Irish background and had military backgrounds, while many others were ex-policemen or from the social elite of eastern Canada. The historian Andrew Graybill notes the comments of one visitor that "nearly all [the ranchers] have been in the Police...it is quite natural as when a man is in the police round here he sees the country and goes in for ranching as soon as he comes out". Timothy Breen observes that as a result "it is hardly surprising" that the ranchers' "relationship with the Police was intimate and almost without exception, cordial".) Illegal squatting by poorer settlers started to become a problem, however, boiling over into open disputes during the 1890s, and the mounted police were deployed to evict them. The task was unpopular among the force, but it grudgingly complied until government policy towards the smaller settlers finally changed in 1896. The police provided a range of other services for the new ranches, carrying out operations along the border to prevent cattle crossing north into the Canadian ranches, running quarantine schemes and helping with veterinary issues.

The scale of horse theft by white thieves along the border increased dramatically during the late 1880s, which the police's sporadic deployments were unable to counter. In response, Commissioner Herchmer introduced a system of police patrols across the territories, with scheduled visits and inspections supported by surprise "flying patrols". (Note: The term "to patrol" came to take on a wide meaning within the force, covering every form of travel from horseback riding to journeys by steamer.) This approach was enabled by a network of new outposts across the major ranches. Police would visit almost every farm or ranch, seek to get to know every member of the community personally, gather intelligence and ask each settler to record any issues in a patrol book. Along the way, the police helped to distribute relief, including to the Métis communities affected by the rebellion, provided emergency medical assistance, and delivered mail to the more remote areas. Under the new patrol system, the mounted police travelled a total of 1,500,000 miles (2,400,000 km) on average each year on horseback. Backed by harsh sentences from the courts, the process virtually eliminated rural crime.

A new system of controlling the movement of the First Nations was introduced by the government after the rebellion. Known as the pass system, this required any individual leaving a reserve to possess a pass signed by a government agent, or to face arrest by the police. The police received advice that the new policy was illegal, as it contravened Treaty 7, which had given guarantees of free movement, but they continued to enforce it for several years. Eventually the force turned to the vagrancy laws as an alternative approach for removing First Nations from selected areas. Police used agents employed to collect intelligence from within First Nation and Métis communities, and, from 1887, they also employed members of the First Nations as special constables, typically deploying them as scouts and trackers. These scouts wore an informal uniform and were empowered to arrest other members of their communities, but not whites. (Note: The First Nation scouts were paid $25 a month along with rations; they provided their own horse, although the police equipped them with their saddle.)

Enforcing the prohibition on liquor began to cause the force increasing problems. The liquor laws had been designed to prevent the First Nations from drinking alcohol, but their terms also applied to the increasing numbers of white settlers in the late 1880s. Although some temperance groups applauded the measures, most settlers opposed them. Special permits to import alcohol for personal consumption could be granted, but these were not issued impartially, adding to the general resentment. Many members of the force drank alcohol themselves, including liquor confiscated from smugglers, and police beer canteens were established to provide members of the force a legal alternative. Settlers also began to routinely evade the laws in the larger towns, despite mounted police searches, the deployment of undercover officers, and large fines being imposed by the courts. Public hostility towards the force grew and the police soon found themselves almost entirely occupied in attempting to enforce the unpopular laws. Legal changes were pushed through in 1892, removing prohibition and allowing the licensing of public bars; the new law was enforced by local town inspectors, removing most of the force's responsibility for the problem.

As there were almost no white women on the Prairies, the influx of the male work crews for the railroad together with the mines being opened in the foothills of the Rocky mountains created an immense demand for prostitution, which flourished as a result. Prostitution was illegal, but the NWMP tended to see it as a "necessary evil", arguing that the male workers wanted sex, and that to shut down the brothels would cause unmanageable social tensions. Between 1874 and 1890, there were only 12 convictions for prostitution in the North-West, which reflected the "necessary evil" policy of tolerating prostitution. The fact that the men of the NWMP themselves frequently made use of the services of the prostitutes was another reason to tolerate the brothels. In an editorial, the Regina Leader mockingly noted the "redcoat of the Mounted Policeman is seen flashing in and out from these dens at all hours. As no arrests have been made the character of these visits can be easily surmised!". Commissioner Herchemer complained that venereal diseases caused more medical treatments in the NWMP than any other, leading him to deduct the costs of medical treatment from the venereal diseases from the pay of the men concerned.

The policy of the NWMP was to allow red-light districts to exist. However, every so often, they would launch a raid to shut down a brothel; this was in order to give the impression that the prostitution was not being tolerated. From 1890, pressure from Protestant churches led to a crackdown being launched on prostitution. However, the campaign was ineffective as the NWMP would raid a brothel and offer the madam the choice of paying a fine or leaving town; generally the latter option was taken. No sooner had the brothel been shut down, then another would open a few weeks later, leading to the cycle being repeated. An additional problem for the NWMP was that the pay for a constable was 60 cents per day, making it difficult as an NWMP to recruit "men of good character and steady habits". By 1904, an average of 10% of the force either were being dismissed or had deserted to the United States. Given that the average age for a NWMP constable was between 20 and 25 and the majority were unmarried, there was a marked tendency for them to associate with the "sporting women" as prostitutes were euphemistically described. The NWMP "necessary evil" policy caused much tension with Protestant churches and civic groups that demanded that prostitution be stamped out in the early 20th century. In 1907, following complaints that a brothel full of Japanese prostitutes was operating in Nose Creek just outside of Calgary, Superintendent Dean of the NWMP refused to shut it down, saying the brothel was medically inspected every 9 days and to shut it down would cause venereal diseases to spread, leading to a furor in the Calgary newspapers.

=== Later years (1895–1914) ===
==== Growth of urban centres ====
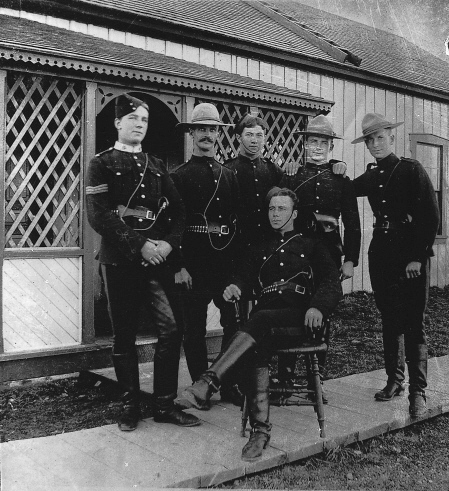
Mounted police, c.1900, wearing the new uniform of red, prairie-style tunics and Stetson hats

Towards the end of the 19th century, immigration, urbanization and industrialization transformed the territories, destroying the old frontier way of life. Three million immigrants arrived in Canada between 1910 and 1914, many of them from eastern Europe, and over half of them settled in the territories. The urban population grew significantly as new towns were established across the Prairies. Many of the immigrants were employed by the growing industries of the region, especially the large mining and manufacturing centres enabled by the Canadian Pacific Railway. As society changed, there were fears of immigrants and criminals exploiting the new rail network.

As a result, there were a growing range of demands on the mounted police, and they struggled to cope with the changes. The rising population drove an increase in the criminal cases tackled by the force: less than 1,000 were investigated in 1900, but within four years the number of cases had risen to over 4,000. There was controversy around what role the mounted police should play in the new towns, and the force became concerned that these were pulling in police manpower, at the expense of the wider, less populated areas of the Prairies, where the patrolling system had already had to be cut back. A special railway branch was briefly established in 1888, using undercover officers positioned along the railway line to gather intelligence, and plans were put forward, but not enacted, to create a larger detective branch. Attempts were made to enforce the prostitution laws in the new towns – previously these had been largely ignored – with the police informally regulating the local sex industries.

There was pressure on the mounted police to assist local government in a wide variety of ways, often opposed by the police themselves. These included supporting public health efforts, distributing relief, fighting and investigating fires, and continuing to manage the movement of cattle. New railway lines continued to be constructed, and the police were tasked to assist in the building the Canadian Northern and Grand Trunk Pacific lines, as well as the Crow's Nest Pass branch of the Canadian Pacific Railway, following the pattern set by their earlier work in the 1880s. There was a heavy legal load on the force's commissioned officers both in their role as magistrates and as informal arbitrators between company management and the construction teams.

==== Industrial relations ====
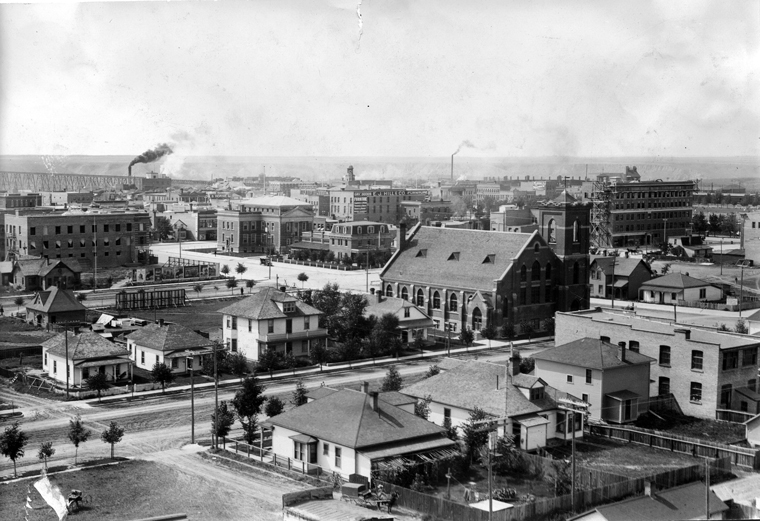
The town of Lethbridge in 1911, where the mounted police deployed to manage several industrial disputes

The new industrial workforce often lived and worked under very poor conditions, and enjoyed few employment rights. Workers who left their jobs in protest could find themselves arrested by the mounted police under the terms of the Masters and Servants Act for deserting their employment, or alternatively detained under the vagrancy laws. Although the position of organized labour was weak in Canada – the trade unions only had very limited legal rights – the number of industrial disputes grew significantly over this period. The resulting lockouts and strikes sometimes required armed government intervention. The militia was most commonly used for this purpose, but the mounted police were cheaper to deploy and were considered to be more politically reliable.

As a result, the force was called in to manage industrial disputes on a range of occasions between 1887 and 1906. (Note: The mounted police were called in to manage disputes in 1887, 1892, 1894, 1896, 1897, 1901, 1903 and 1906.) In the mining town of Lethbridge, for example, the Alberta Railway and Coal Company locked out its workforce in 1894 during an attempt to cut staff and reduce wages; a team of ten police was deployed to maintain order, in particular any risks posed by eastern European immigrants, and to mediate in the dispute. Police deployed there again in 1906 for nine months during a dispute between the company, now called the Alberta Railway and Irrigation Company, and the workforce over union recognition, pay and working conditions. A team of 82 regular police were reinforced by 11 special constables recruited from within the company, with an undercover constable deployed to infiltrate the strike and send back intelligence. Efforts were made to collect information on the earnings of the union leaders, probably intended for use in discrediting them. The police maintained order and escorted non-striking workers past the picket lines.

Historians hold differing views as to whether the mounted police were neutral in these disputes or sided with the employers, although all agree that the position of the police in managing the strikes became more difficult as organized labour became better established. (Note: The historian R. C. Macleod champions the argument that the mounted police's role was marked by their "disinterestedness", suggesting that the force was "effectively neutral in almost all labour disputes". Andrew Graybill concludes that by 1906 "the Mounties were not honest brokers but rather sympathized with the company", and William Baker argues that "the Mounties were usually anti-labour", and "comprehended and sympathized with management's perspective more naturally than with the viewpoint of the striking miners". Steve Hewitt suggests that the police typically blamed agitators for problems and were required to sometimes use force, but that they had some sympathy for the difficulties of ordinary workers.) The mounted police disliked labour agitators and strikers with eastern or southern European backgrounds, but they also had some sympathy for the difficulties faced by ordinary workers, and were often unwilling to actively assist the company owners if there was a risk it might cause disturbances to break out.

==== Klondike Gold Rush ====
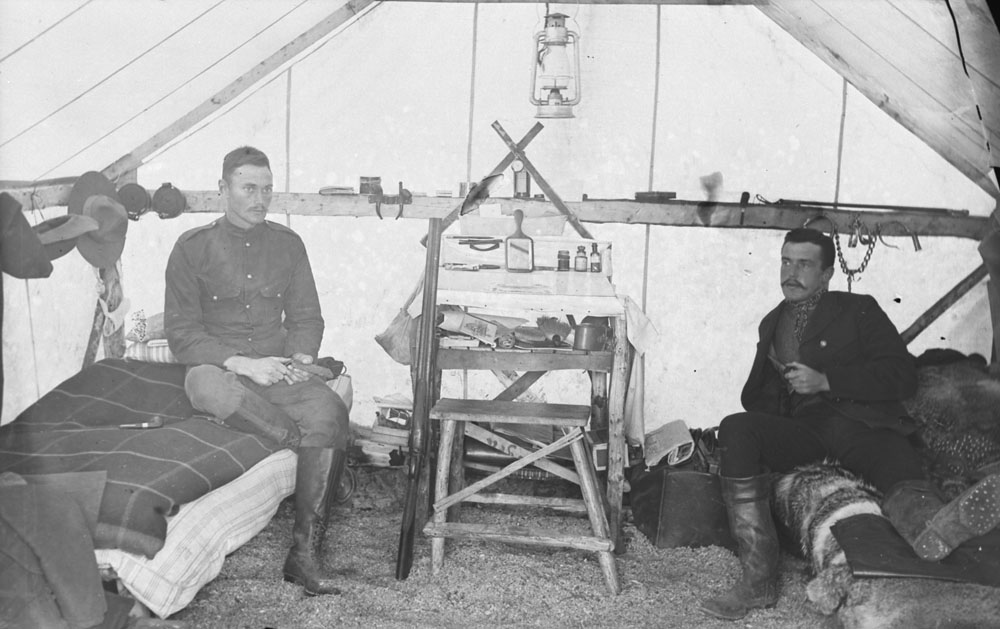
Mounted police deployed to the Yukon, 1898

Up until the 1890s, the government had no presence in the far north-west of Canada. In 1894, the rise of gold mining and a growing population led to calls for Ottawa to intervene, both to control whisky trading and to protect the local First Nations. In response, the mounted police carried out a survey along the Yukon River and gathered customs duties. Fears grew that the United States might try to seize the mineral-rich region, and a twenty-man police team was established at Forty Mile in 1895. Although there was very little actual crime, frictions soon rose between the police and the Miners' Committees, which had been created to provide informal justice during the previous few years. The police brought the issue to a head in June 1896, sending a team into one of the mining camps to overturn the decisions of the local committee.

In 1896, huge amounts of gold were discovered in the Klondike valley. Once news of this circulated the following year, around 100,000 people rushed to the Klondike in search of wealth, most with no experience in the mining industry. (Note: Research into the numbers of "stampeders" involved in the Klondike Gold Rush draws on a range of sources, but in particular uses the statistics maintained by the mounted police along the trails and the census carried out by the force in 1898.) To reach the area, many prospectors travelled by foot over arduous mountain routes and along rivers using primitive boats, although no more than 40,000 of them successfully reached the goldfields. A substantial and expensive mounted police detachment was established in the Klondike, amounting to 288 men by 1898, representing around a third of the entire force and including many of its most experienced personnel.

The borders in the region had been disputed since the American purchase of Alaska from Russia in 1867, and most of the influx of prospectors were American. (Note: Early historical analysis, as outlined by George Fetherling, suggested around 80 percent of the prospector were either United States citizens or recent immigrants to the country. The 1898 census data suggests that 63 percent of Dawson City inhabitants at the time were American citizens, with 32 percent Canadian or British. Charlene Porsild notes that the census data for the period is inconsistent in how it asked questions about citizenship and place of birth. Porsild argues that the level of participation from those born in the United States, as opposed to recent immigrants or temporary residents, may have been as low as 43 percent, with Canadian and British-born members of the gold rush in the majority.) Amid fresh concerns that the United States might annex the gold fields, the mounted police were tasked to assert Canadian control along the border line. The force set up control posts at the borders of the Yukon and at easily controlled mountain passes, equipping the posts with Maxim guns. The police checked for illegal weapons and prevented the entry of criminals and collected customs duties, while helping protect and guide the flow of migrants, mediating in their disputes and providing practical advice.

The mounted police established their headquarters in the boomtown of Dawson City and patrolled out across the Yukon Territory, creating a network of thirty-three posts. Detectives were deployed to infiltrate American organizations to seek out potential conspiracies. The police's role also encompassed fire safety, the management of local game hunting, operating the postal and telegraph system, acting as coroners and running the mining registration system. The historian Morris Zaslow describes the Yukon as forming a "police state" during this period, and William Morrison has highlighted the force's paternalistic willingness to invent and enforce non-existent laws whenever they considered it necessary. The police acted efficiently and with probity during the period, largely curbing criminality in the region, although their task was helped by the geography of the Klondike, which made it relatively easy to bar entry to undesirables. The Klondike gold rush attracted immense worldwide publicity at the time, and the contrast between the relative order of Dawson City in the Yukon vs. the more chaotic and violent situation in Skagway, Alaska caused much comment in the newspapers. Reflecting the improved image of the NWMP, in 1897 as part of the celebrations of the Diamond Jubilee of Queen Victoria, a group of NWMP riders clad in their colorful scarlet uniforms marched down the streets of London as part of the Canadian contingent. The NWMP riders caused a sensation in London, and it was from that time onward the romantic image of the Mounties became popular in Britain.

==== Second Boer War ====
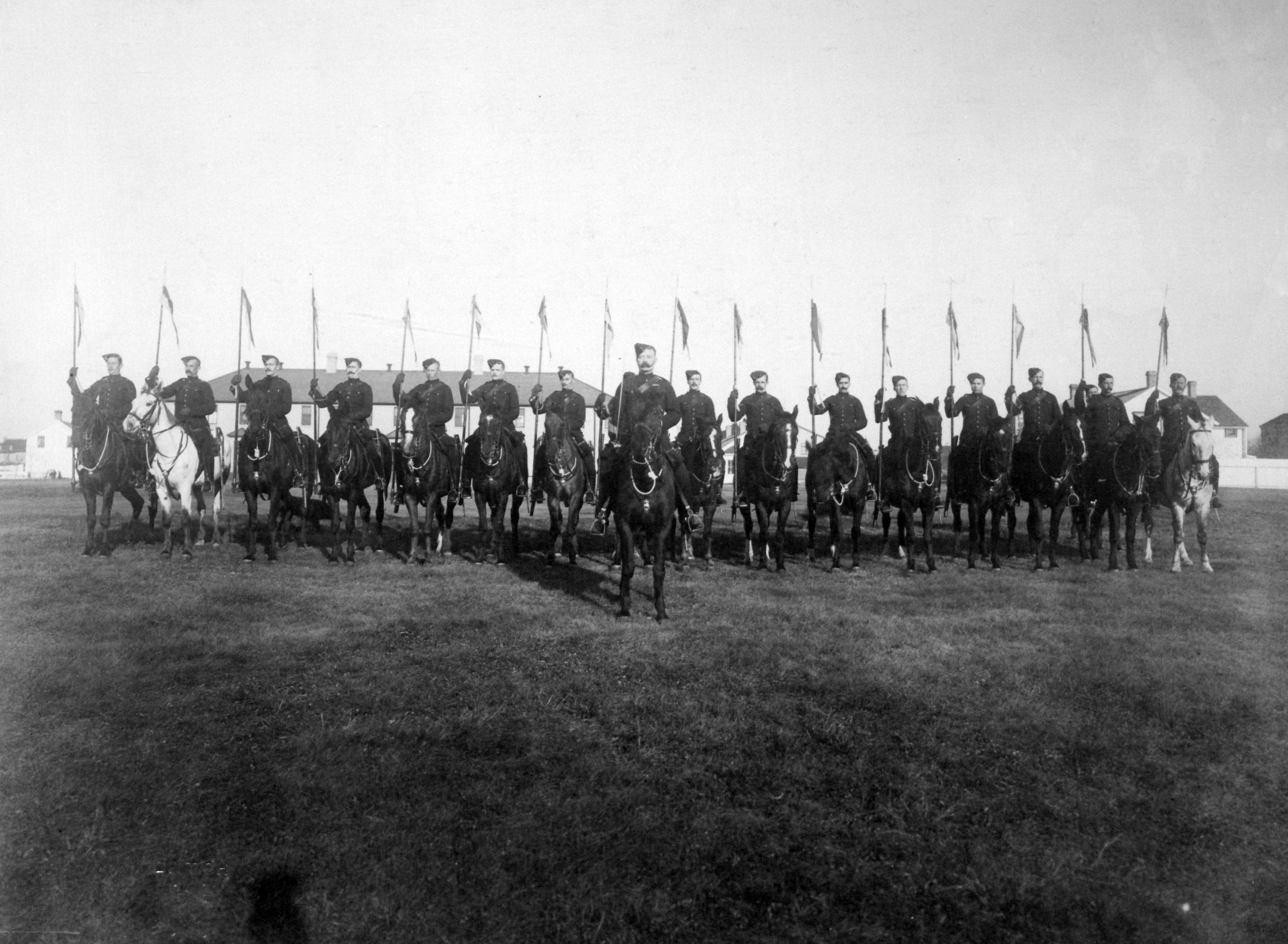
Canadian Mounted Rifles during the Second Boer War, 1900

When the Second Boer War broke out in 1899, many members of the mounted police wanted to volunteer to serve in South Africa, motivated by sympathy for the British imperial cause and the strong military tradition within the force. Indeed, Commissioner Herchmer had proposed sending a force of 350 men to join the Sudan campaign in 1896, but was turned down by his superiors. There was public enthusiasm for a Canadian military response; however, at first, it appeared that only a minimal deployment would be needed, and it was only after several British defeats that an offer of a more substantive force was welcomed by London. The Canadian government turned to the mounted police as their main source for experienced mounted soldiers, and members were given leave from the force for the duration of their service. Combined with the pressures of maintaining the commitments in the Yukon, this reduced the number of the police in the remaining territories to only 682 men by 1900. The similarity of the vast expenses of the veld to the Prairies was felt to make the NWMP well qualified for operations in South Africa. Herchmer was an efficient bureaucrat, but his authoritarian leadership style made him ill-suited to "handle the hardy dare-devils" who rushed to join up to fight for Queen and Country in South Africa.

Herchmer recruited and commanded a group of 144 mounted police volunteers, who made up almost half of the new 2nd Battalion of the Canadian Mounted Rifles; many of the other volunteers in the battalion were also ex-policemen. (Note: It is unclear why the mounted police were not allowed to form their own independent mounted police unit in the South African campaign. The decision may have been due to pressure from the Canadian military leadership, or because creating a special unit for the campaign would have made it harder to ultimately close down the force, which at the time remained the government's intent.) The NWMP influence on the Canadian Mounted Rifles battalion was strong; of the officers of the battalion, 13 out of 19 were NWMP men. Of the policemen who volunteered to fight in South Africa, 67.4% were British-born while the remainder were Canadian-born, reflecting the tendency of male British immigrants in Canada to be the ones most likely to volunteer for service in South Africa. Soon after the battalion's arrival in South Africa, however, Herchmer's superior, Major General Edward Hutton, concluded that Herchmer was unsuited for military command and retired him from duty. Herchmer complained to the prime minister, who then dismissed him from the police altogether, replacing him with Aylesworth Perry, a career policeman and a supporter of the Liberal government.

The mounted police influenced the creation of other imperial units during the conflict. Lord Strathcona, the Canadian High Commissioner in London, raised a unit of mounted infantry modelled on the force, believing this would be particularly suitable for taking on Boer scouting parties. Thirty-three serving members of the police joined the unit, including Superintendent Samuel Steel, who became their commanding officer. The Strathconas wore the mounted police's Stetson hat as part of their uniform, while in turn their distinctive boots were adopted by the police as their official footwear in 1901. The South African Constabulary was created in October 1900 to police the recaptured territories; it mirrored the mounted police, with its members again wearing the force's Stetson hat; it incorporated forty-two members of the mounted police and one of its divisions was commanded by Steele. The mounted police volunteers suffered seven casualties during the conflict. Sergeant Arthur Richardson, a member of the Strathconas, won the Victoria Cross for rescuing a Canadian soldier under heavy fire at Wolve Spruit. In 1904, the Crown renamed the force the Royal Northwest Mounted Police to honour its contributions in the war.

==== Controversy and criticism ====
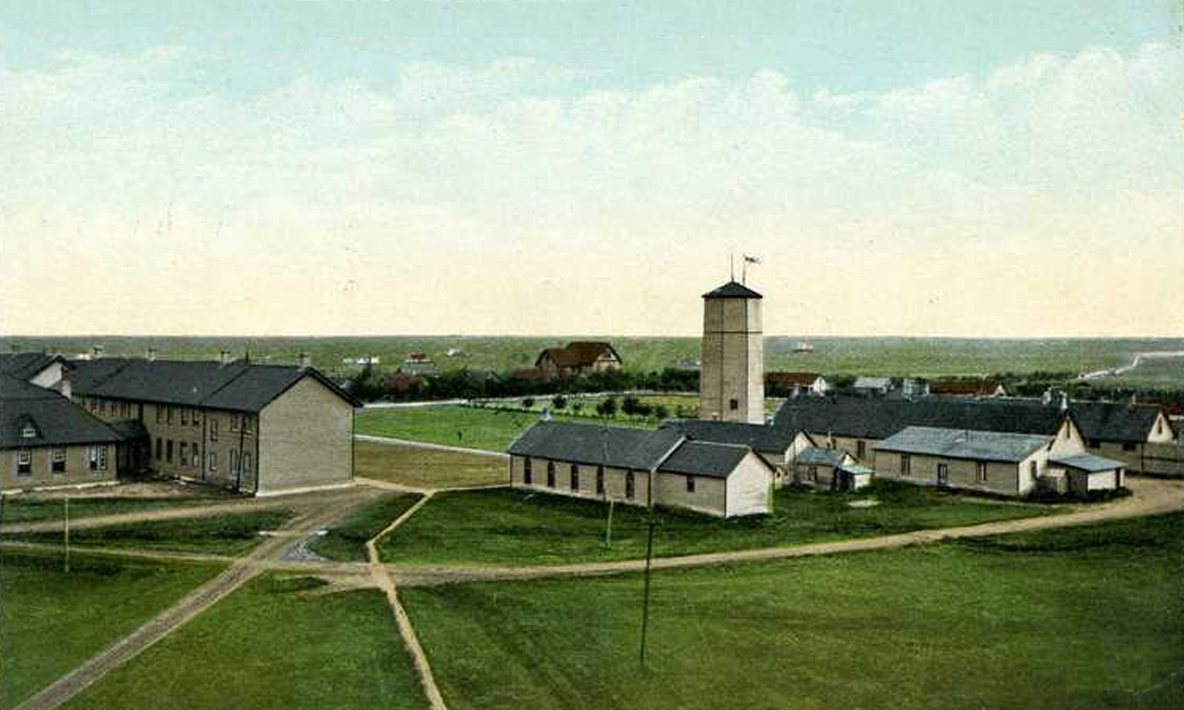
RNWMP Headquarters in Regina, c.1905

The mounted police continued to face criticism after 1885, through a sequence of allegations in the popular press known as the "Herchmer scandals". Lawrence Herchmer had been appointed as commissioner partially because of his positive reputation within the Indian Department, but also because of his Conservative sympathies and his family links to Prime Minister Macdonald. Herchmer's brother William – himself a mounted police superintendent – had arrested the newspaper-owner Nicholas Davin for public drunkenness several years before. Apparently motivated by a desire for revenge, Davin pursued a vendetta against Lawrence when he became commissioner, helped by another newspaper publisher, Charles Wood. Lawrence Herchmer was unpopular with many of his officers and Davin published their critiques of him, along with accusations of a wide range of misdemeanours. The government ordered an investigation, followed by a judicial inquiry, both of which cleared Herchmer of any serious charges.

Nonetheless, the force's reputation suffered from the controversy and complaints persisted that the force was oversized, excessively funded and staffed by political appointees. By the 1890s, a political consensus had emerged in Ottawa that the western provinces should become autonomous and take up responsibility for their own policing; it was therefore time to plan for the closure of the force, which originally had only been intended to be a temporary organization. The force was reduced to 850 men in 1893, and to 750 by 1898. (Note: As a result of the cutbacks after 1893, and then the new commitments in the Klondike, the patrolling system had to be scaled back considerably.) The Conservative government stood for reelection in 1896 with plans to further reduce the size of the force, reportedly to 500 men, but lost to the Liberal party, led by Wilfrid Laurier. The new prime minister had stood for election on a platform of increasing the rights of the provinces to carry out law enforcement. He produced plans to halve the size of the mounted police as a first step towards eliminating the force, and proposed to establish a new militia regiment in the NWT to fulfil any legacy military requirements.

The events of the Klondike Gold Rush challenged this policy, as the force soon became essential to controlling the borders in the far north. Moving the entire force to the remote region of the Yukon, though, would have more than doubled the cost of the police's training and support arrangements, and their existing bases therefore remained vital to the northern operations. The increasing demands from the railway companies and mining companies for police assistance, and appeals from the ranching community for continued support, also made it harder for the Liberals to consider cutting back the force. The Second Boer War then disrupted plans to create a replacement militia unit, while Herchmer's disastrous tour in South Africa enabled the Liberals to replace him with Perry, a Liberal supporter. As a result, the political argument began to swing back in favour of potentially retaining the force.

After the 1904 elections, the new provincial governments of Alberta and Saskatchewan announced their desire to take on similar responsibilities to those in the eastern provinces, but showed no sign of actually establishing provincial police forces of their own. Finally, Laurier proposed in 1905 that the mounted police should remain in the new provinces, under contract to the provincial authorities for $75,000 (~$2.08 million in 2025) per year apiece – about one-third of the actual operational cost – a solution which was approved by both sides. (Note: The region of New Manitoba was taken into the contract when the province expanded in 1912.) The workload on the police grew quickly as a consequence, with the criminal cases being handled almost trebling between 1905 and 1912 to over 13,000. Despite complaints from Commissioner Perry, the government refused to increase the establishment of the mounted police. By 1913, the provinces were expressing dissatisfaction about the service being delivered, and Saskatchewan indicated its intention not to renew the contract in 1916.

==== Expansion into the north ====
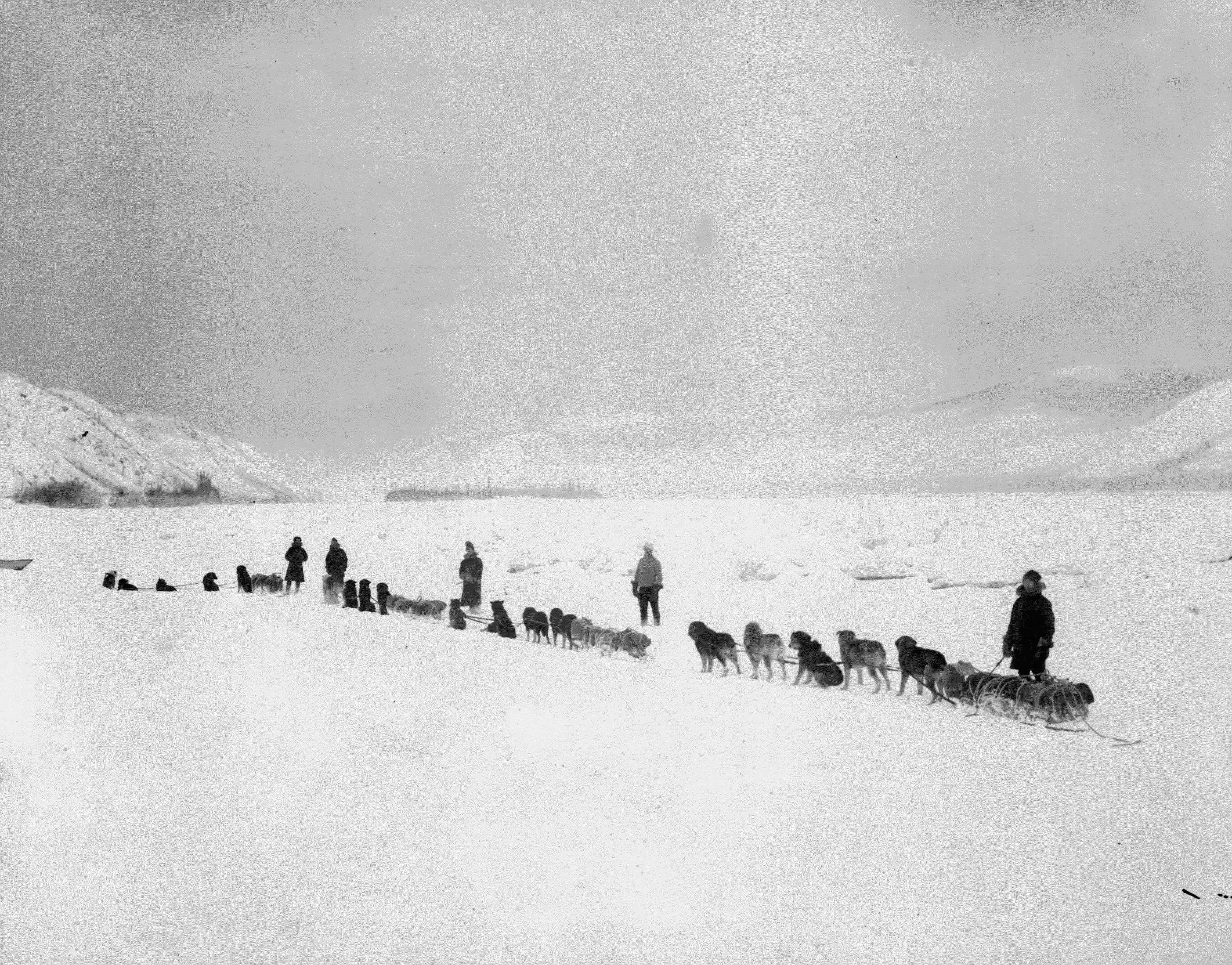
Mounted police patrolling from Dawson City to Herschel Island in 1909, led by Constable William Dempster

After the Klondike Gold Rush, the mounted police continued to spread their network of posts across the far north. In 1903, a small team of police under Inspector Charles Constantine were sent to Herschel Island to investigate the alleged sexual mistreatment of Inuit women by the transient whaling community there; the decision was also driven by fears that the United States might try to assert sovereignty over the wider Mackenzie Delta. The police found no evidence of sexual abuse, but took the opportunity to collect customs duties and to attempt to clamp down on liquor sales to the indigenous community. The same year, a well-publicized Canadian expedition was sent to Hudson Bay on the schooner SS Neptune, including Superintendent John Moodie and a small team of mounted police.

Extending the police's presence across the region was logistically challenging, requiring the creation of a network of new posts and the use of steamers to move supplies around the coast. It proved to be a harsh existence for the force, particularly when deliveries of supplies were delayed by bad weather. Work began on a railroad to Hudson Bay in 1908, continuing for two decades, which, although it required substantial police assistance, gradually eased the challenge of supplying the police outposts around the bay. The police opened temporary detachments around York Factory in 1912, and then at Port Nelson in 1913, where the police established their divisional headquarters. Patrols pushed up into Baker Lake and along the Coppermine River until, by the end of the decade, the police presence in Hudson Bay had been reduced to a bare minimum, with the force focusing on reaching out into ever more remote areas.

The First Nations in the north typically had some prior experience of Europeans, for example through contact with the Hudson's Bay Company, and there was little conflict between the police and these native communities, and few crimes committed. The First Nations typically did not like the police, however, and often blamed them for wider government policies; for their part, the mounted police often regarded the First Nations with contempt. By comparison, the mounted police got on much better with the Inuit, who had seen far less contact with Europeans. The force generally took a more liberal, paternalistic attitude towards them, often applying informal justice rather than official laws when the occasional Inuit crime was committed. Members of the First Nations and Inuit were employed to drive police dog sleds and cook for their patrols.

=== Final years (1914–1920) ===
==== First World War ====
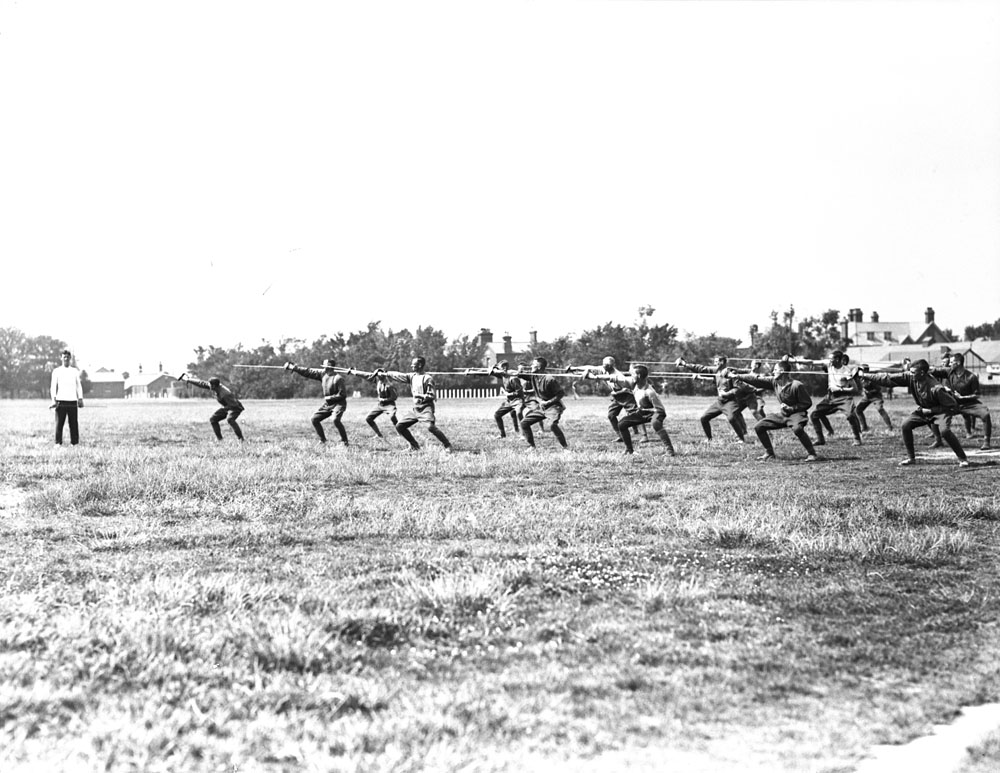
Mounted police in training during the First World War at Shorncliffe, England, 1918

When Canada entered the First World War in 1914, the government became concerned that national security might be threatened, either by immigrants who still sympathized with their home countries in central Europe, or from citizens of the United States with German or Irish backgrounds crossing over the border. The authorities introduced new war-time secrecy regulations, including the censorship of the press. The responsibility for tackling these tasks was assigned to the federal Dominion Police but they had very limited resources; indeed, before the war they had often had to hire private detectives from the United States. The Dominion Police therefore delegated much of their responsibilities to local police forces, including, in the cases of the provinces of Alberta and Saskatchewan, to the mounted police.

The mounted police initially began their wartime operations by focusing on the activities of immigrants and carrying out border security, but quickly widened their operations. Unlike during the Boer War, the mounted police at first were forbidden to volunteer for military duty abroad, and the size of the force was instead temporarily increased to 1,200 men. The force investigated rumours of conspiracies associated with the Central Powers, but, since most mounted police did not have links within the relevant ethnic communities, they instead used secret agents and informants to gather intelligence, supported by a few undercover officers. (Note: To provide a sense of scale, in the provinces of Alberta and Saskatchewan the mounted police investigated 173,568 Canadian citizens of German and Austrian background during the war. The police used three categories of secret investigators: regular members of the force, often detectives, working undercover; full-time "secret agents", typically chosen for their ethnic background and language skills; and "informants", effectively part-time secret agents providing ad hoc information. As the historian Stanley Horrall suggests, many of the labour organizations of the period regarded such secret agents as "police spies or agent provocateurs".) Meanwhile, tensions grew between temperance campaigners and soldiers over the implementation of the liquor laws. The police barracks in Calgary were attacked in October 1916 by a crowd of over two hundred soldiers and civilians, who were trying to release six soldiers arrested for alcohol offences. The building was destroyed, one police officer was shot and several more injured.

The demands of the force's new security role, combined with its traditional policing responsibilities, soon overstretched the police's resources. Commissioner Perry raised his concerns about the situation with the government and in response the Alberta and the Saskatchewan Provincial Police forces were created, allowing the closure of over 80 mounted police posts. Perry argued that the force had now "largely finished the work for which it was called into existence" and proposed that the mounted police should instead focus on supporting the Canadian Expeditionary Force in Europe, threatening to resign if the police were not allowed to fight. Despite complaints from the military that there was no longer any requirement for cavalry on the Western Front, a force of 738 mounted police were sent overseas in May 1918 to form "A" Squadron, and a further 186 were deployed to Siberia to support the British forces engaged in the Russian Civil War. By December, there were only 303 mounted police left in Canada, primarily focused on border protection, and the intelligence networks created earlier in the war were allowed to wind down.

==== Bolshevik fears ====
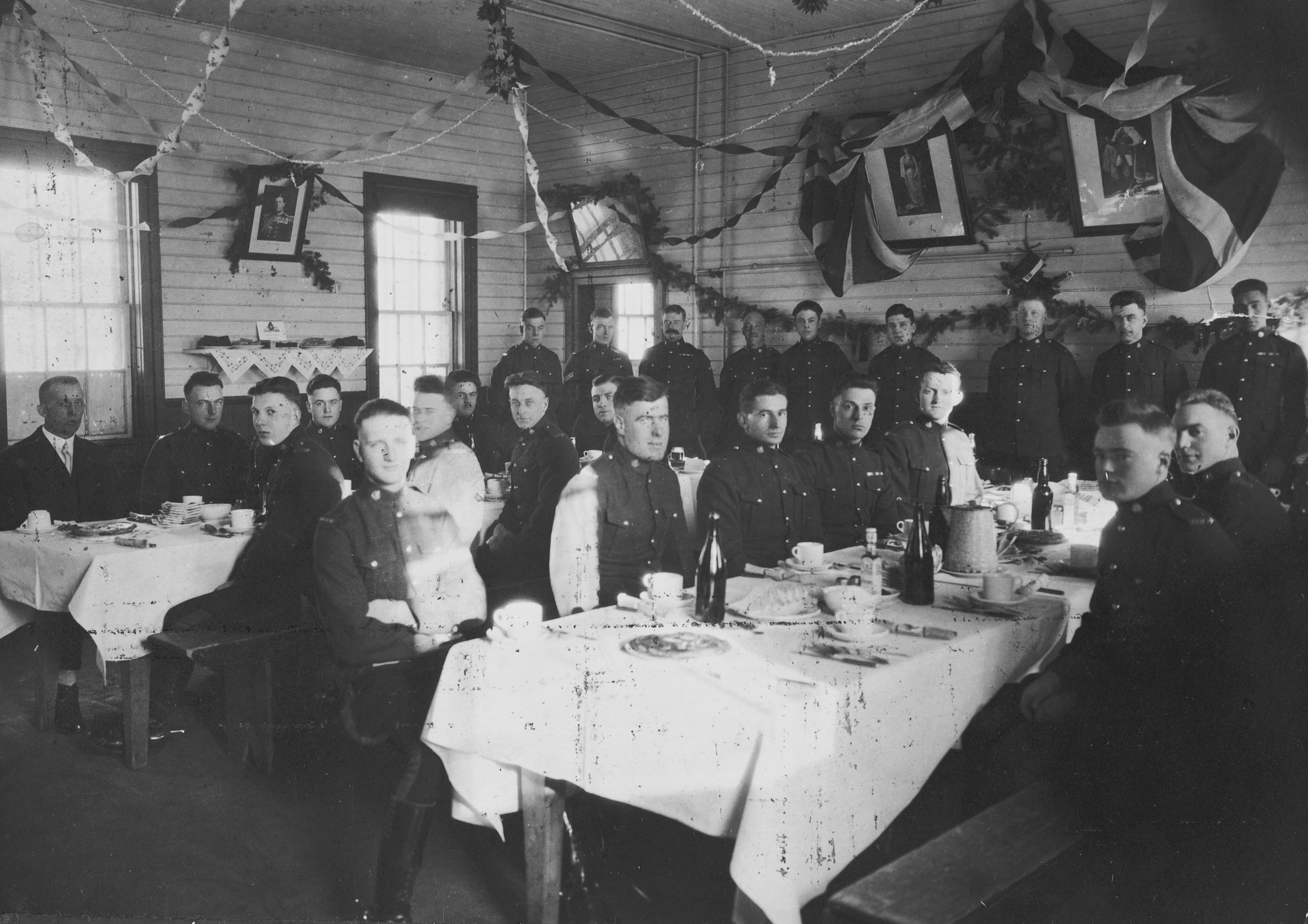
Christmas dinner at Fort Macleod, 1919

Conscription was introduced in Canada during the final years of the war, which was accompanied by labour shortages, pressures for social change, and the rapid unionization of the remaining workforce. While concerns about the Central Powers declined, fears grew in government at the end of 1918 that the new Bolshevik government in Russia might be covertly orchestrating a campaign of strikes across Canada. In response the Prime Minister, Robert Borden, created a Public Safety Branch led by the politician Charles Cahan. Cahan envisaged transforming this organization into a much larger secret service, similar to the Bureau of Investigation in the United States, but he soon fell out with Borden and ultimately resigned.

Meanwhile, Commissioner Perry had put forward three options for the future of the mounted police: the force could be absorbed into the Canadian military; the remit of the force could be reduced to simply policing the far north; or the force could be assigned a much wider role in public and secret policing across the whole of Canada. Perry promoted the third option and Arthur Meighen, the acting Minister for Justice, therefore proposed merging the mounted police and the Dominion Police, placing them under Perry's command. This idea was turned down by Borden, who believed, incorrectly, that the merger would be unacceptable to Perry, whom he thought still wanted a military future for the force.

Instead, in December 1918, Borden reorganized the federal Canadian security system by splitting the policing of the country geographically, with the mounted police running the western half and reporting to the President of the Privy Council, and the Dominion Police running the eastern side, under the oversight of the Minister of Justice. The establishment of the mounted force was to be permanently kept at 1,200 men, creating a huge demand for manpower: those members of the force still serving in Europe and Siberia were ordered to return. The police began to recruit new networks of secret agents, whom Perry tasked to investigate "foreign settlements" to identify "the least indication of Bolshevik tendencies and doctrines", and the force embraced new laws allowing for the deportation, without trial, of immigrants suspected of holding extremist views. The police's operations were well run, although no significant evidence of any Bolshevik plot was actually discovered.

==== Amalgamation ====
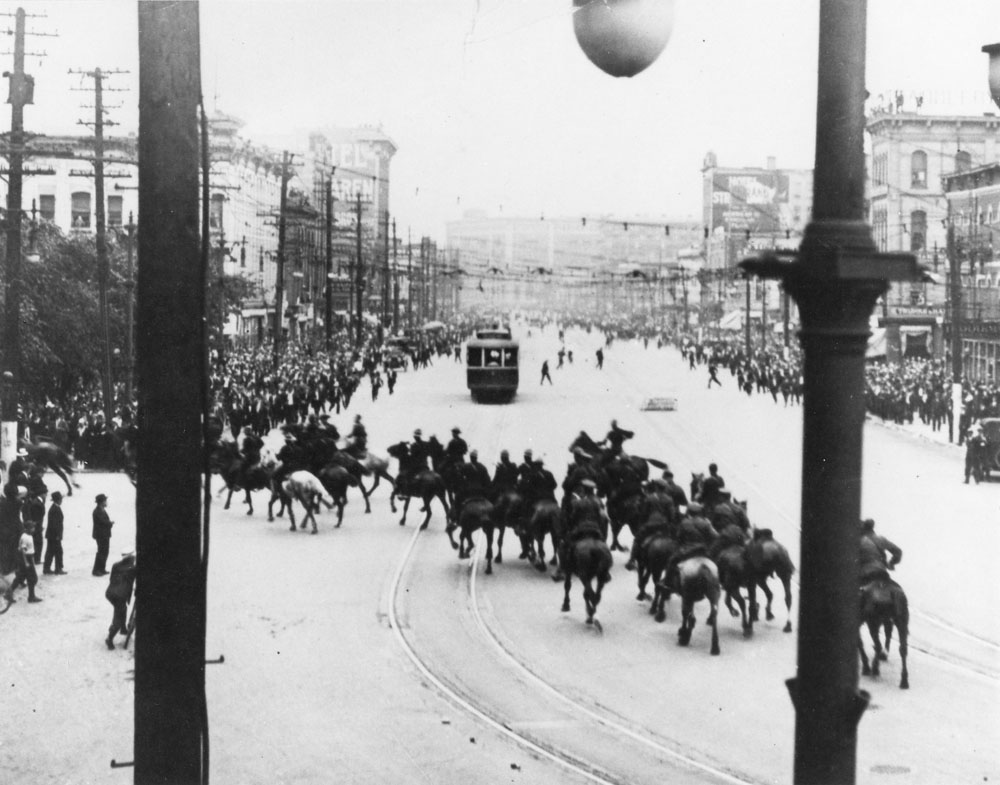
The mounted police on June 21, 1919, during the Winnipeg General Strike

The government remained deeply concerned about the Bolshevik threat, and in May 1919 the Winnipeg General Strike broke out, creating a national crisis which ministers feared would lead to a revolution. The mounted police were deployed to maintain public order and generate intelligence on the strikers; 245 mounted police were sent into the city, supported by four machine guns mounted on lorries. On June 21, which became known as Bloody Saturday, military veterans marched through the city in support of the strikers; the authorities called in the mounted police to break up the marchers. By the time the police arrived, the protesters had begun to riot and the police carried out two mounted charges. The police then concluded that they were losing control of the situation and fired their revolvers into the crowd, killing one man and injuring others. The marchers fled and the strike collapsed.

The events in Winnipeg highlighted the chaotic and ill-coordinated management of security issues across Canada, the artificial division between policing organizations in the west and east of the country, and the absence of a single senior leader for security work. Commissioner Perry recommended creating a new federal police force, ideally by amalgamating the Dominion Police into the existing mounted police force. The mounted police, he argued, were much larger, militarized, experienced and had a proven capacity to carry out secret intelligence work. They were also free from union influence and enjoyed high prestige among the public.

In response, Prime Minister Borden amended the policing legislation in November 1919, bringing together the RNWMP and the Dominion Police to form the RCMP, with the new force responsible for federal law enforcement and national security across Canada under the command of Perry. The legislation came into effect on February 1, 1920, officially marking the end of the older force.

== Organization and working life ==
=== Structure ===
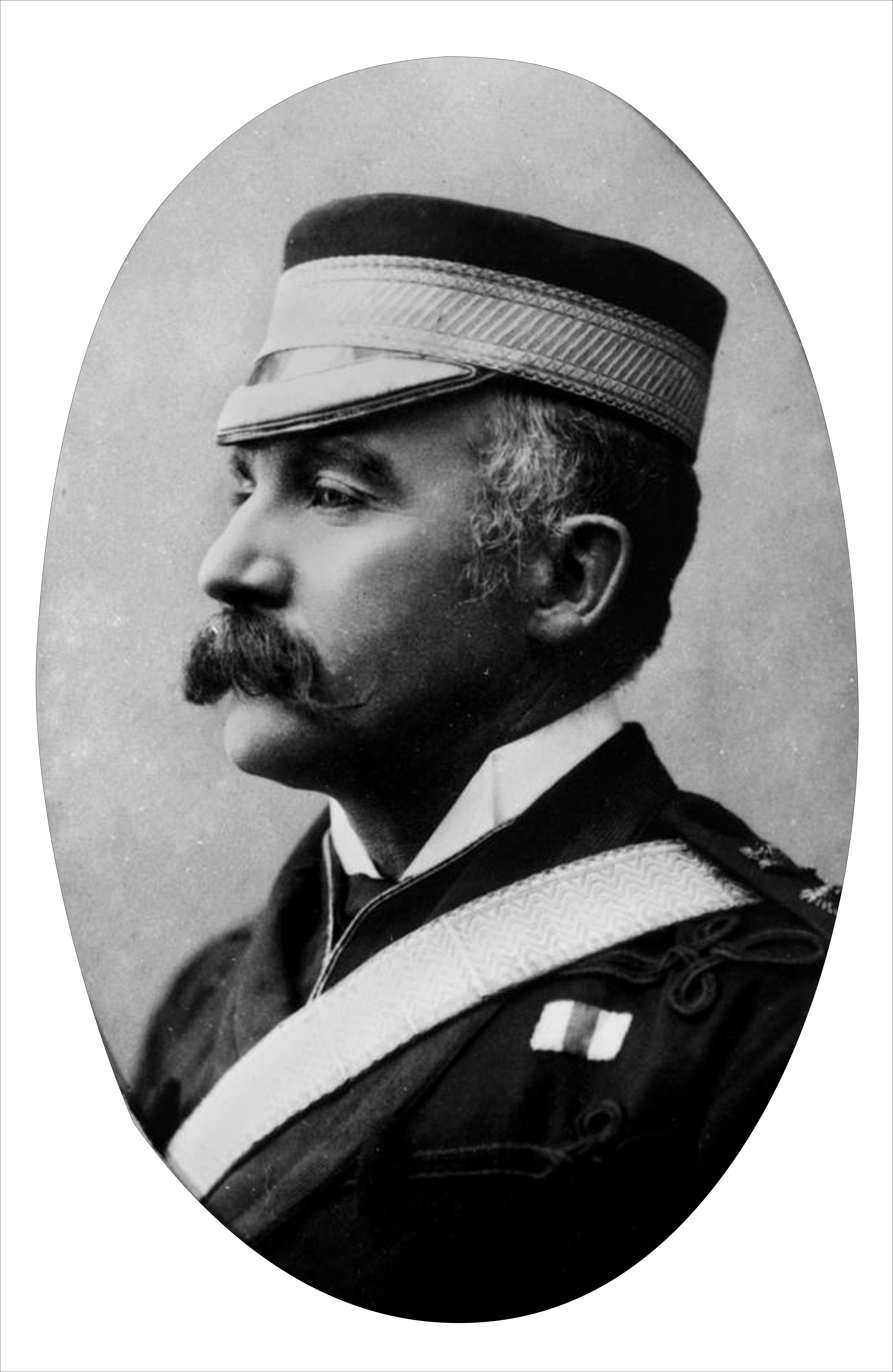
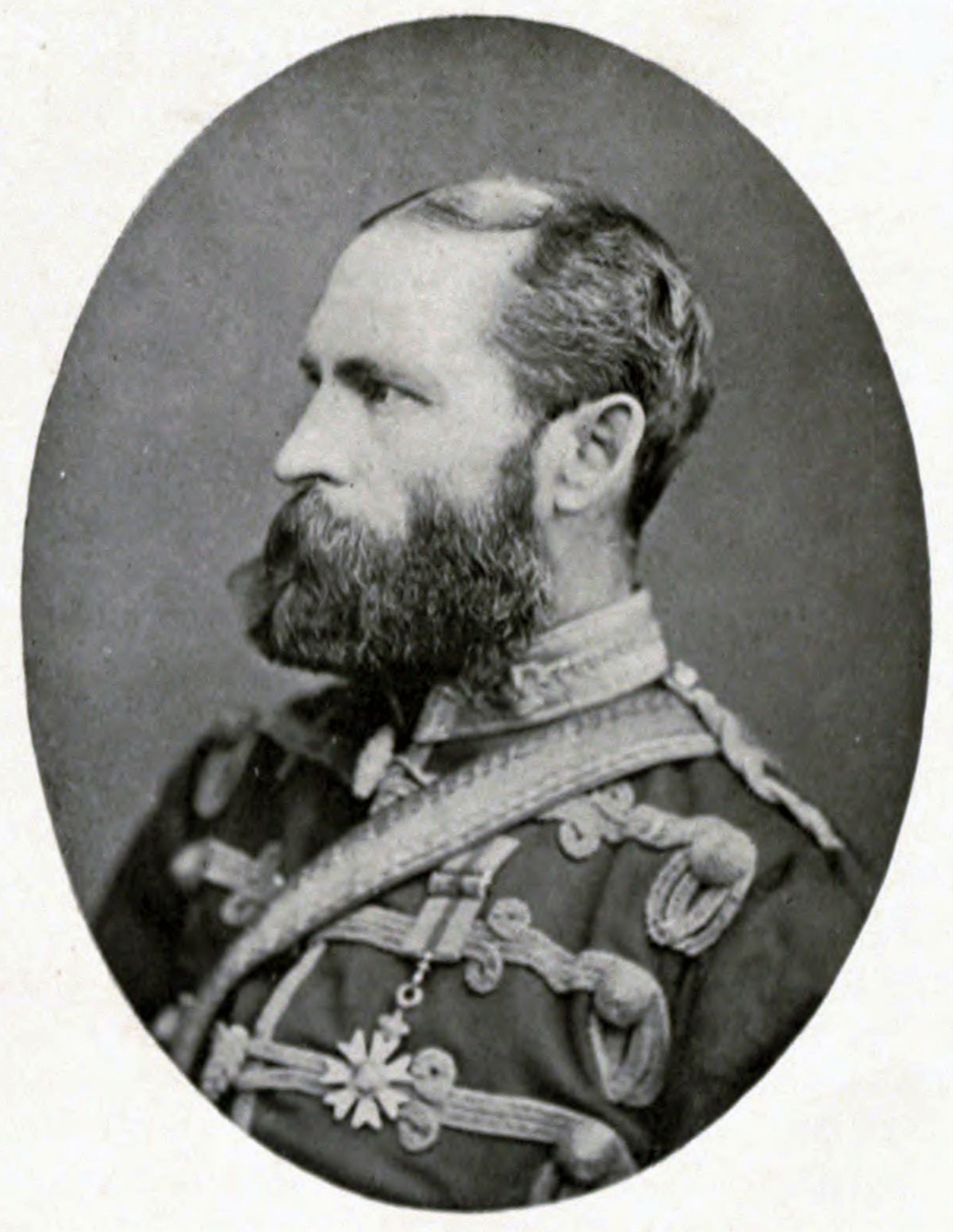
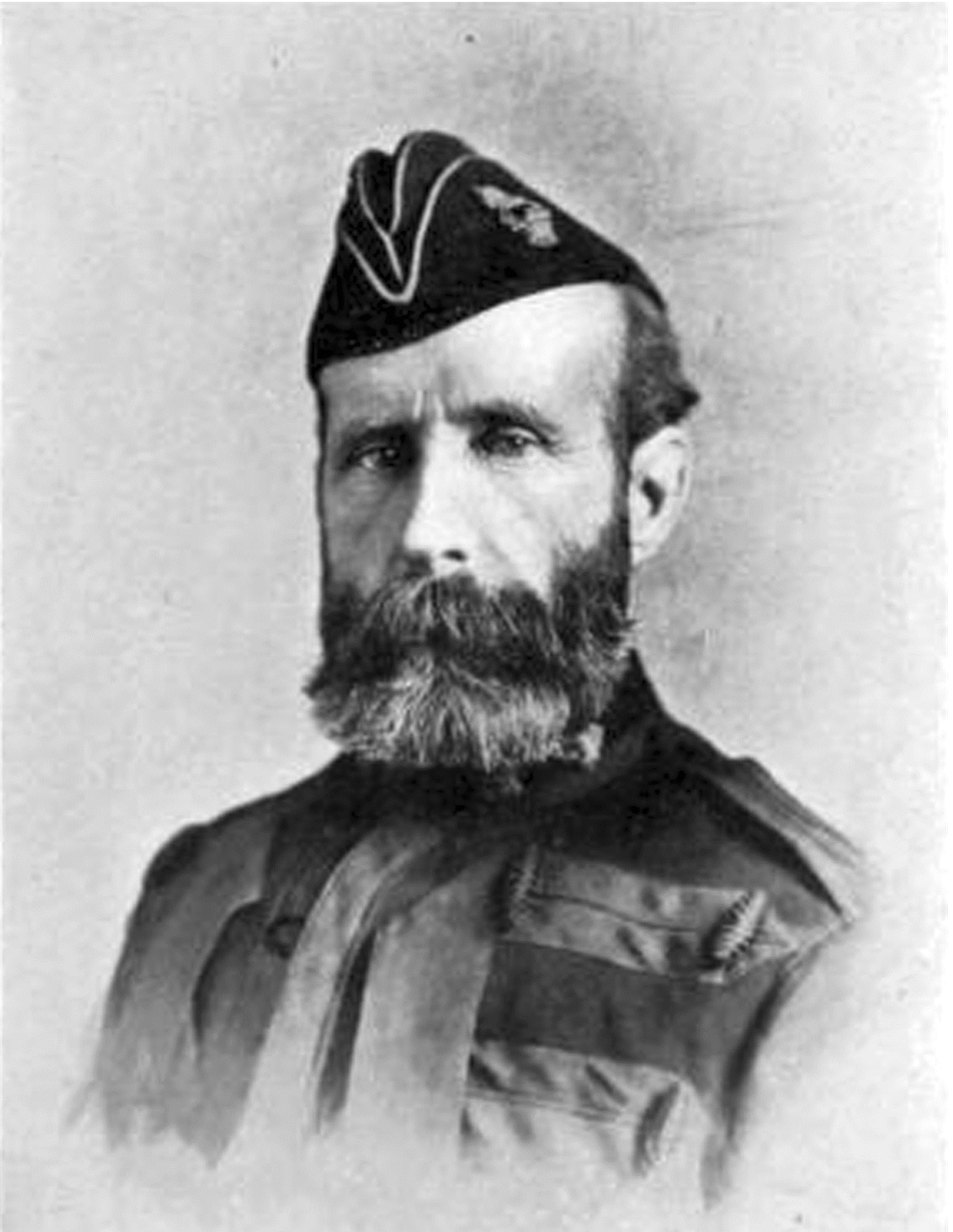
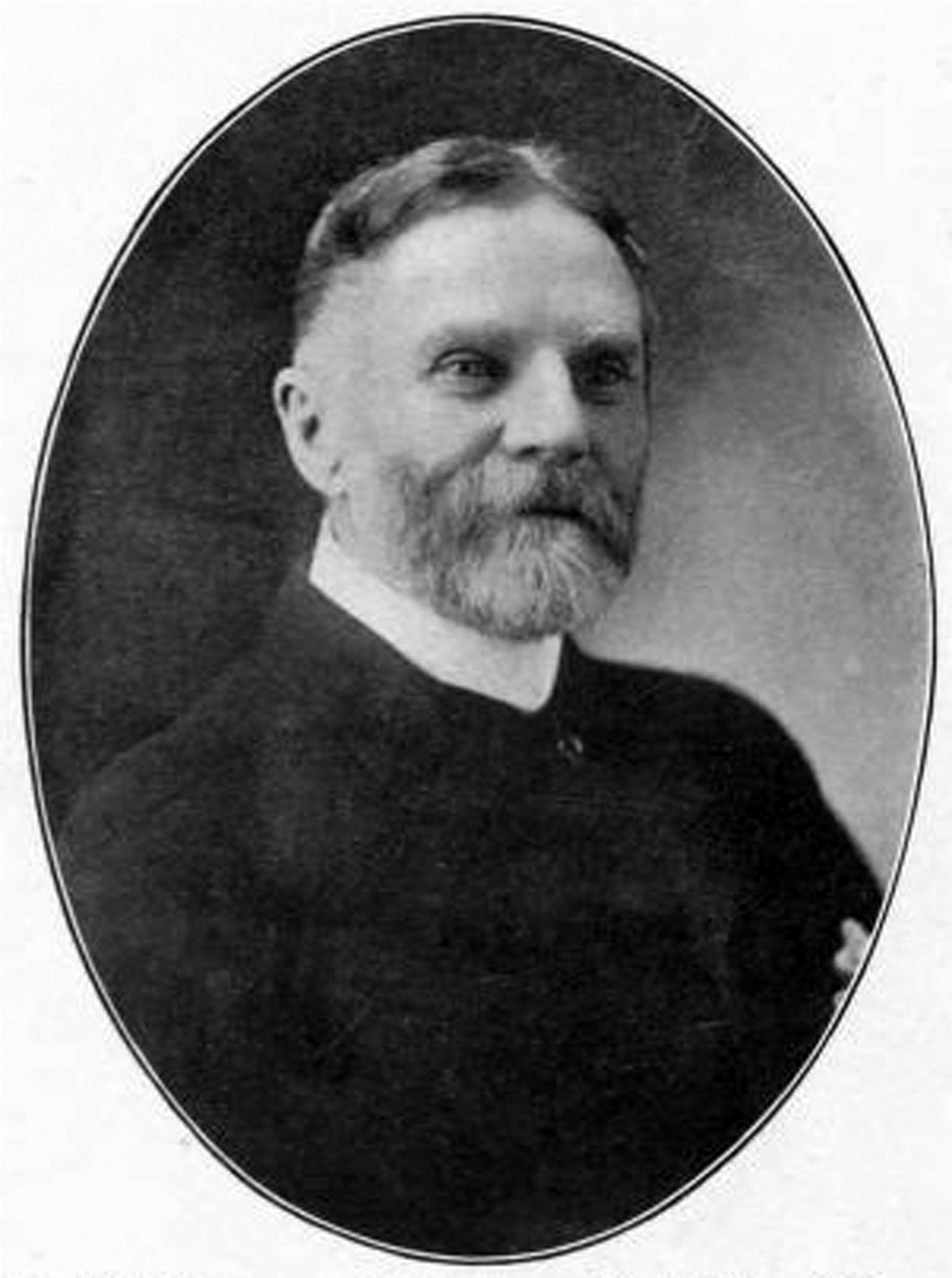
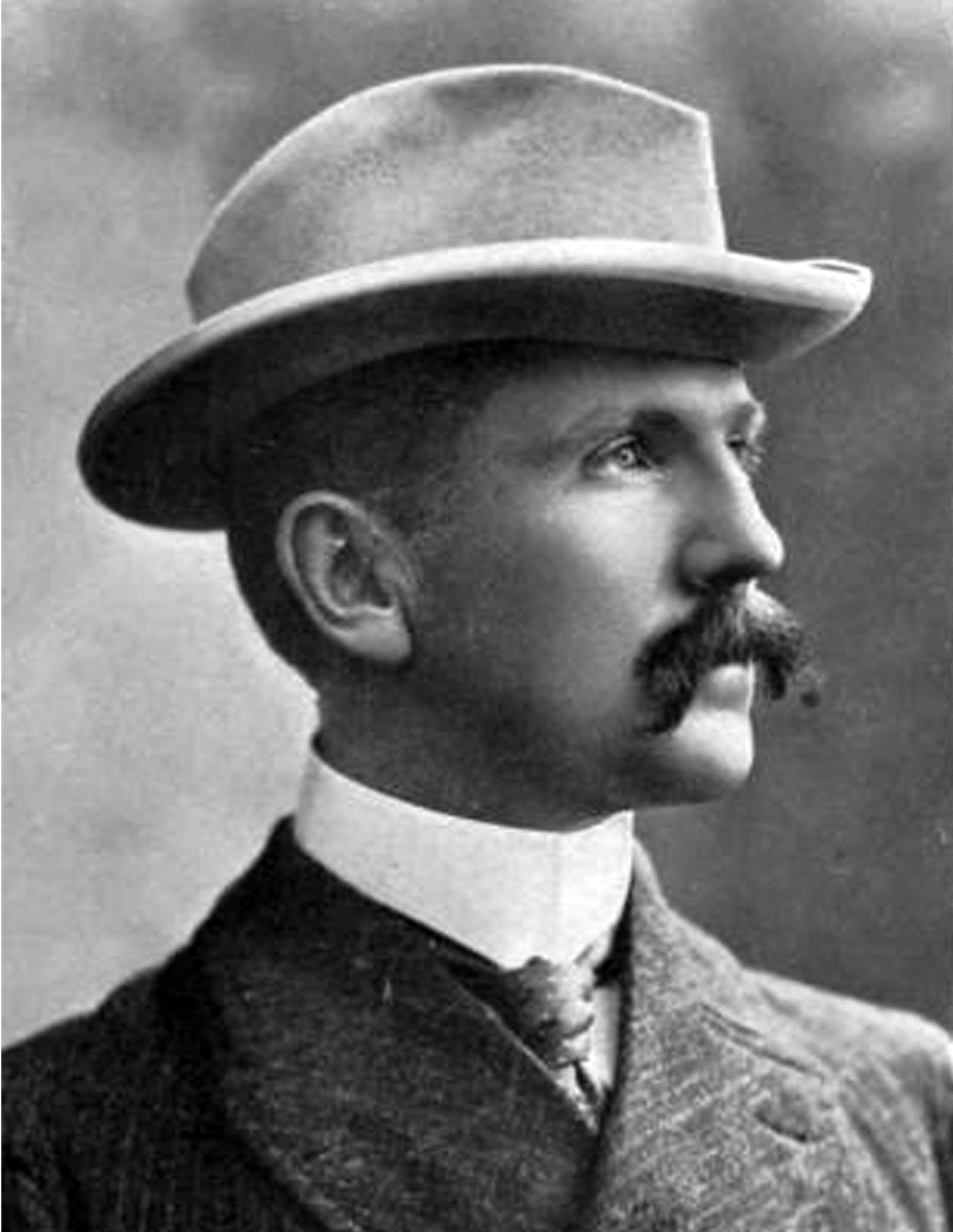
Mounted police commissioners, (left to right): George French, James Macleod, Acheson Irvine, Lawrence Herchmer and Aylesworth Perry

When the NWMP was formed in 1873, it initially had a rank structure of inspectors, sub-inspectors, staff constables, constables and sub-constables, with the force as a whole headed by the commissioner and the assistant commissioner: this system reflected that in use in the Royal Irish Constabulary, upon which the force was modelled. In 1878 this structure was overhauled and replaced by a hierarchy of superintendents, inspectors, staff sergeants, sergeants, corporals and constables. Informally, the commissioned officers were often referred to by equivalent army titles, the commissioner being associated with the rank of colonel, with superintendents and inspectors using the titles of major and captain respectively. Over the course of its life, the force had five commissioners: George French from 1873 to 1876, James Macleod to 1880, Acheson Irvine to 1886, Lawrence Herchmer to 1900 and Aylesworth Perry, who led the force until its amalgamation in 1920.

Although at first the force answered to the prime minister, in 1876 control was passed to the Secretary of State, an arrangement which was reinforced in the Mounted Police Act of 1879. The mounted police's rules and regulations were initially very informal, drawing on the Mounted Police Act of 1873 and a "Rules and Regulations" document published in 1874. In the absence of further guidance, its officers made ad hoc use of British military regulations, effectively managing the force as they might have done a cavalry regiment. This led to a rather disorganized approach, and in 1886 Superintendent Richard Dean issued a revised set of standing orders, followed by a much longer, "Regulations and Orders" booklet in 1889. This framework empowered the Assistant Commissioner to monitor, inspect and investigate all aspects of the force, and encouraged a much more disciplined approach to tracking operations and resources.

The force was divided into various divisions, each typically commanded by a superintendent. The headquarters of the force was initially sited at Lower Fort Garry, until the March West to Fort Walsh, but in 1888 it was moved to Regina, to be closer to the new railway line. The Regina headquarters became known locally as "the Barracks", and during the 1890s typically held around 200 police at any one time. Many of the force's posts were linked by the telegraph network and, from 1885 onwards, by telephones, with the communications encrypted when necessary using Slater's Telegraphic Code. Typewriters were acquired in 1886, and a printing press for disseminating orders in 1888. The force did not have its own prison – those sentenced to prison terms would be sent to the Manitoba Penitentiary – and until 1891 the only short-term jail facilities in the territories were the guardrooms of the force's various divisional headquarters. (Note: A territorial jail was finally built in Regina in 1891.)

Although the force was commanded by its commissioner, there was also an influential senior post of comptroller, created in 1880 in response to Macleod's financial mismanagement of the force. For most of the force's history the role was occupied by Frederick White, until replaced by A. A. Mclean in 1913. The comptroller was responsible for keeping account of expenditure, auditing and managing procurement, and effectively removed most of the non-operational functions from the commissioner's responsibility. White was a political client of Prime Minister John A. Macdonald, who took a close interest in the management of the force, and the post became critical for garnering support from Ottawa for investment in the police. (Note: During the Klondike Gold Rush, the region was officially run by the Frederick White in his role as Comptroller, rather than through the normal governmental channels, and White also served as the Commissioner of the North-West Territories from 1905 to 1918.)

=== Commissioned officers ===
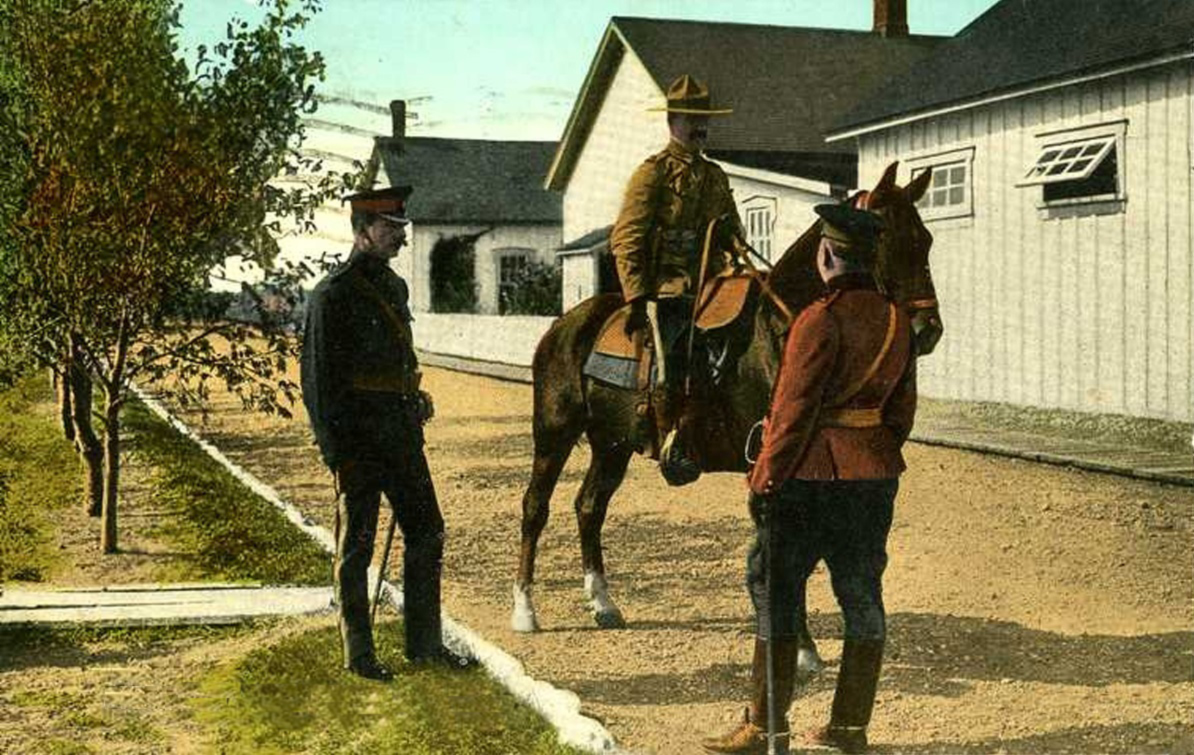
Mounted police officers at Fort Macleod, c.1917, (l to r) in service order, patrol and full dress uniform

The NWMP was commanded by a relatively small team of commissioned officers, having an establishment of 25 officers in its early years, of whom around a quarter were medical and veterinary officers, rising to 50 after 1885, a ratio of approximately one officer to every twenty enlisted men. The officers were usually from middle- or upper-class backgrounds, and were typically Canadian-born; deliberate attempts were made to reflect the different religious and ethnic groups that made up white Canadian society. They depended on political patronage from the government of the day in Ottawa for their appointment and career progression, and were typically selected on the basis of their military experience, service in the police ranks or previous study at the Royal Military College in Ontario.

The officer corps formed part of the social elite in Canada, and considered themselves to be much closer to the prestigious, regular military than to their equivalents in the local police forces. Commissioned officers were expected to join and participate in an officers' mess, which the police based on the corresponding military tradition. Many were members of the Freemasons, a popular movement among Protestant Canadians. The officers were made Justices of Peace, giving them powers to try civilian cases, and they also had authority to summarily try members of the force itself, potentially imprisoning constables for up a year for even minor offences.

Commissioned officers were paid a respectable wage for the period; an inspector in 1886 earned an annual salary of $1,000 (approximately $31,613 in 2025). Early in the force's history, additional payments were made to officers for successfully collecting customs duties and seizing illegal goods; Superintendent Leif Crozier was paid a bonus of $3,659 in 1886 (approximately $131,114 in 2025), for example. Once an officer had purchased items such as their uniform, which would cost around $500, and maintained a presence at key social events, however, this salary was thinly stretched. Most officers found it difficult to support a family on their police income alone, and either relied on their private wealth, or took on additional paid roles and government offices. Commissioned officers were members of the civil service pension scheme, but this was increasingly regarded as inadequate and their pension provisions were reformed in 1902.

Commissioned Officers' Rank Insignia
1870–1900	Commissioner	Deputy commissioner	Assistant commissioner	Chief superintendent	Superintendent	Inspector	Sub-inspector

=== Other ranks ===
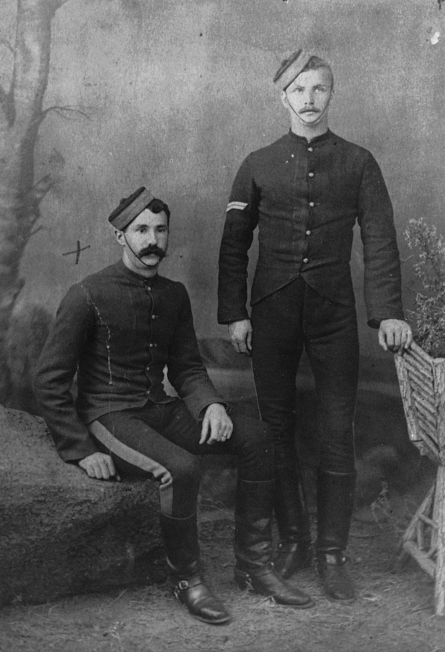
Mounted police corporal and a constable, wearing undress or "walking out" uniform, 1885

The first enlisted men to be recruited in 1873 came from a wide variety of backgrounds, but most had some military experience. Many of the men enlisting in this tranche were later dismissed as unsuitable for service, less than half completing their term of enlistment, and more care was taken in later recruiting. Initially, a majority of the force were of Canadian origin but the number originating from Britain rose steadily during the 1880s until they made up over half of all new recruits, with British-born mounted police also tending to predominate in the non-commissioned cadre, mainly because they chose to stay longer in the force. Although the number of Canadian-born recruits increased for a while, the economic boom of the 1910s made the task much harder, and the mounted police opened a recruitment office in London; by 1914 almost 80 percent of the force had been born in Britain.

The first contingent of police enlisted for a three-year term of service, but later recruits enlisted for five-year periods, with the possibility of their purchasing an early discharge. Early in the force's history, the training of recruits was carried out on an ad hoc basis at the police's headquarters; in response, a depot for training new recruits created in Regina in 1885, based on the Royal Irish Constabulary Depot in Dublin, which took a much more structured approach. The use of the depot declined in line with the reduced number of new recruits joining the force after 1895, and was ultimately replaced by the new School of Instruction in 1899. Efforts were taken throughout the 1880s and 1890s to improve the quality of recruits being accepted by the force, and to tackle the related problems of early discharge and desertion, which was making staff retention a serious problem.

Sub-constables, initially the lowest rank in the force, were paid 75 cents a day in 1873, with a promise of 160 acres (65 ha) of land on completion of their enlistment, but the pay was cut by a third in 1878 and the land grants ceased. As a result, constables were paid a basic wage of 50 cents a day, with basic provisions included, with a senior non-commissioned officer earning three times as much. Combined with "working pay" bonuses for particular duties, a constable could earn over $300 a year, which was initially about the same as a Canadian school teacher. At the start of the 20th century, the rates of police pay were unchanged and had become quite low by wider Canadian standards; they were slowly increased, the basic rate rising to $1 a day in 1905, and then to $1.50 and finally $1.75 by 1919. A pension scheme was introduced in 1889, albeit in the face of political opposition.

Early in the force's history, the police lived in buildings that they termed "forts", typically one-storey buildings constructed by the police themselves from logs, with sod roofs. In the first year of the force, the poorly constructed fort at Swan River drew particular condemnation from senior officers: Commissioner French complained to Ottawa about the "exposure and hardship" that the police detachment were enduring. Even once the force was properly established, living conditions remained very basic: the forts used wood- and coal-burning stoves for heating and cooking, and were lit by oil lamps and candles, while the constables slept on wooden boards using straw-filled mattresses. In the early 1880s, conditions grew so bad that the constables at Fort Macleod issued a manifesto to their officers demanding improvements to their living conditions.

Gradual improvement began to be made in the 1880s and 1890s; the later police barracks lost the title of "fort" and were professionally assembled, made from planed lumber, often prefabricated in the east, and fitted with modern technology and iron beds. Canteens, reading rooms and sporting facilities were introduced at the larger barracks. Nonetheless, living conditions on the prairies remained difficult and spartan, and mosquitoes, lice and bed bugs were major irritants. When the force deployed to the far north, the police were once again living in extremely basic conditions, in a very dangerous climate; a network of small shelters had to be built to protect units out on patrol, although these did not prevent the well-publicized deaths of the "Lost Patrol" of Inspector Francis Fitzgerald during the winter of 1910–11.

The initial ranks for other ranks were sub-constable, constable, and chief constable, with staff constable between constable and chief constable added later. Though through the early years many enlisted members, as with officers, would refer to themselves by their former military ranks or the military equivalent of their NWMP rank.

Other Ranks' Rank Insignia
1870s	Chief Constable	Staff Constable		Constable	Sub-Constable
1880s–1890s	Sergeant major	Staff sergeant	Sergeant	Corporal	Constable
1900s	Sergeant major	Staff sergeant	Sergeant	Corporal	Constable

== Uniforms and badge ==
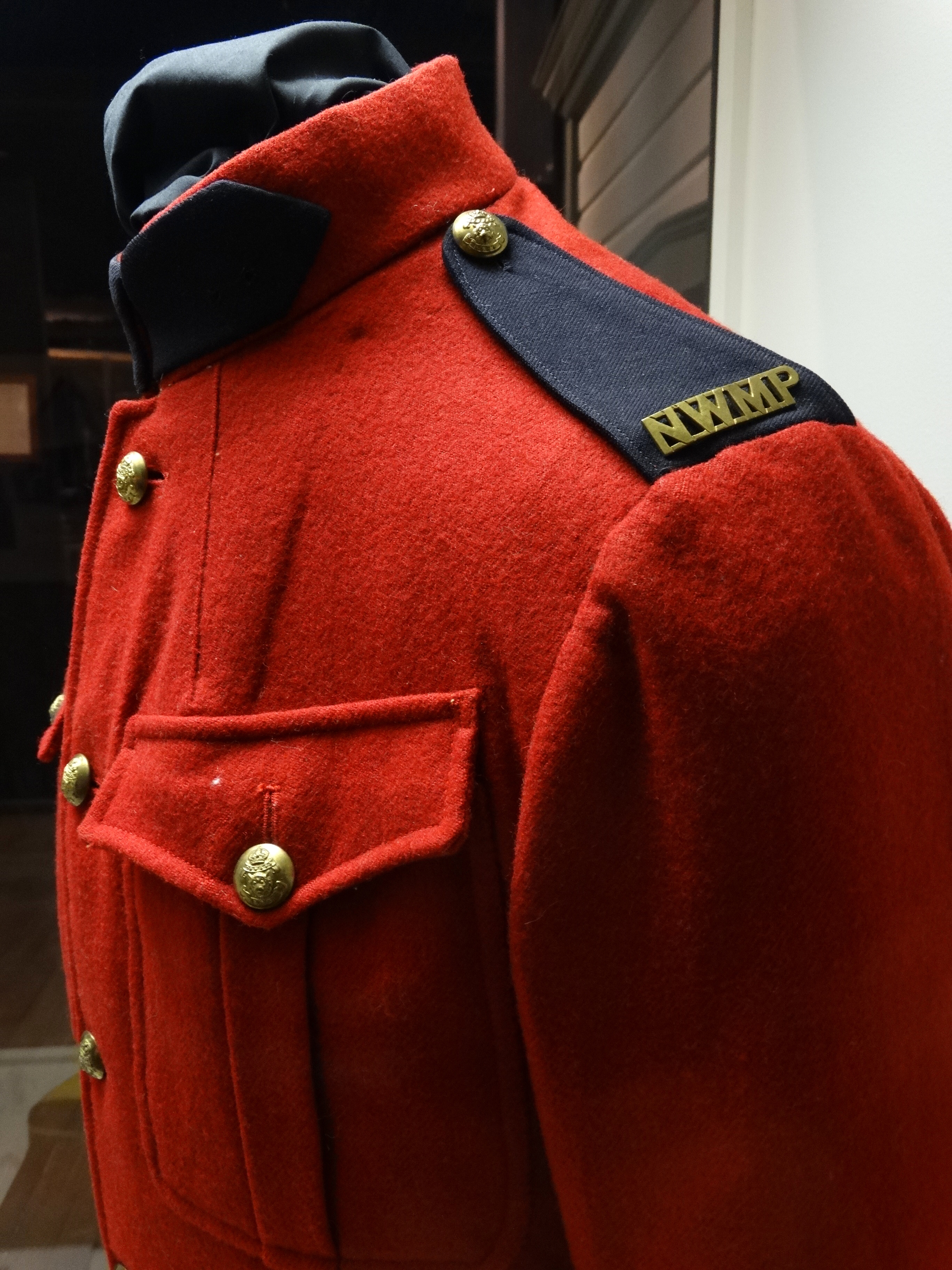
Mounted police red serge tunic

The first recruits to the force in 1873 were issued uniforms comprising scarlet Norfolk jackets – issued from the militia stores and chosen on the advice of Colonel Patrick Robertson Ross and Governor Alexander Morris – brown belts, white helmets, grey breeches and brown boots, with a round forage-cap for their undress uniform. (Note: The police's red uniforms were a departure from tradition in the region (previous British and Canadian forces deployed to the west had typically worn green uniforms, rather than red) but reflected contemporary British advice on the most appropriate style for military uniforms.) The grey trousers were soon replaced with blue ones, with a yellow stripe along the sides. These early uniforms were quite plain, and commissioned officers and their enlisted men wore essentially the same uniform.

Changes made in 1876 introduced more elaborate uniforms for commissioned officers based on those worn by the 13th Hussars, with similarly militaristic uniforms for the other ranks, using gold braid to distinguish the non-commissioned officers. These uniforms were initially of rather low quality, as the government had contracted out the work to prison convicts. The winter uniforms comprised grey overcoats with fur caps and moccasins, although the police preferred wearing warmer buffalo coats, which were available until the herds died out. In 1886, the hussar-style uniforms were replaced by a simpler dragoon version, and dark-blue undress uniforms introduced. In the 1880s, blue pea jackets made from pilot cloth became popular among the police as part of their winter outfit, and were officially issued from 1893 onwards. There were continual attempts to produce a consistent uniform across the force, but this was only ever partially successful due to the multiple government suppliers who each produced slightly different variants.

A tension remained between uniforms which were perceived as smart (reflecting the force's military heritage) and practical uniforms (which were suitable for the daily work of the police). The mounted police's white helmets, forage-caps and tight tunics were impractical for work on the plains, and a set of clothes termed "prairie dress" instead evolved unofficially, becoming the dominant style of uniform in the force by 1900. Prairie dress typically included a buckskin jacket, oilskins for wet weather, and leather leggings, combined with a wide-brimmed felt hat: by the late 1890s, the Stetson was the headgear of choice. A standardized form of prairie dress, called "patrol dress", was formalized in time for the 1897 Jubilee celebrations, featuring a brown duck stable jacket. By the turn of the century, many police were wearing a combination of a red serge tunic, cut to resemble the prairie-dress tunic, and the Stetson hat, a combination which later became famous.

The first police to deploy to the Yukon equipped themselves with specialized cold-weather clothing, and subsequent detachments were equipped with deer-skin parkas, fur hats and boots. In the more extreme conditions of the far north, the police adopted local Inuit clothing for use on their patrols, even though this required daily maintenance, often carried out by local Inuit women. Mounted police deployed to Siberia c. 1918 wore the standard army khaki uniform used by mounted forces.

The force's badge emerged around 1876 and came into common use by the late 1890s. It comprised a buffalo or bison head, maple leaves, a crown – early on, the St Edward's crown, after 1903, the Tudor crown – and the police's motto. There are several explanations for the use of the buffalo head: it may have been due to Inspector James Macleod's use of a buffalo head in his office in the mid-1870s, or may have been a prairie adaption of the Clan MacLeod's bull badge. The motto originally ran "Maintien le Droit", meaning "to maintain the right", but after 1915 was altered to read "Maintiens le Droit". This French phrase, occurring as a 14th-century motto in England, was first used in Canada by the Grand Trunk Railway Regiment, a militia unit, in the 1860s; it remains unclear why the mounted police adopted the motto.

The expression "They always get their man", or "The Mountie always gets his man", associated with the force since 1877, has no official standing, but comes from the adaptation created by Hollywood from an American newspaper-report in the Fort Benton [Montana] Record from April 1877.

== Equipment ==
=== Weaponry ===
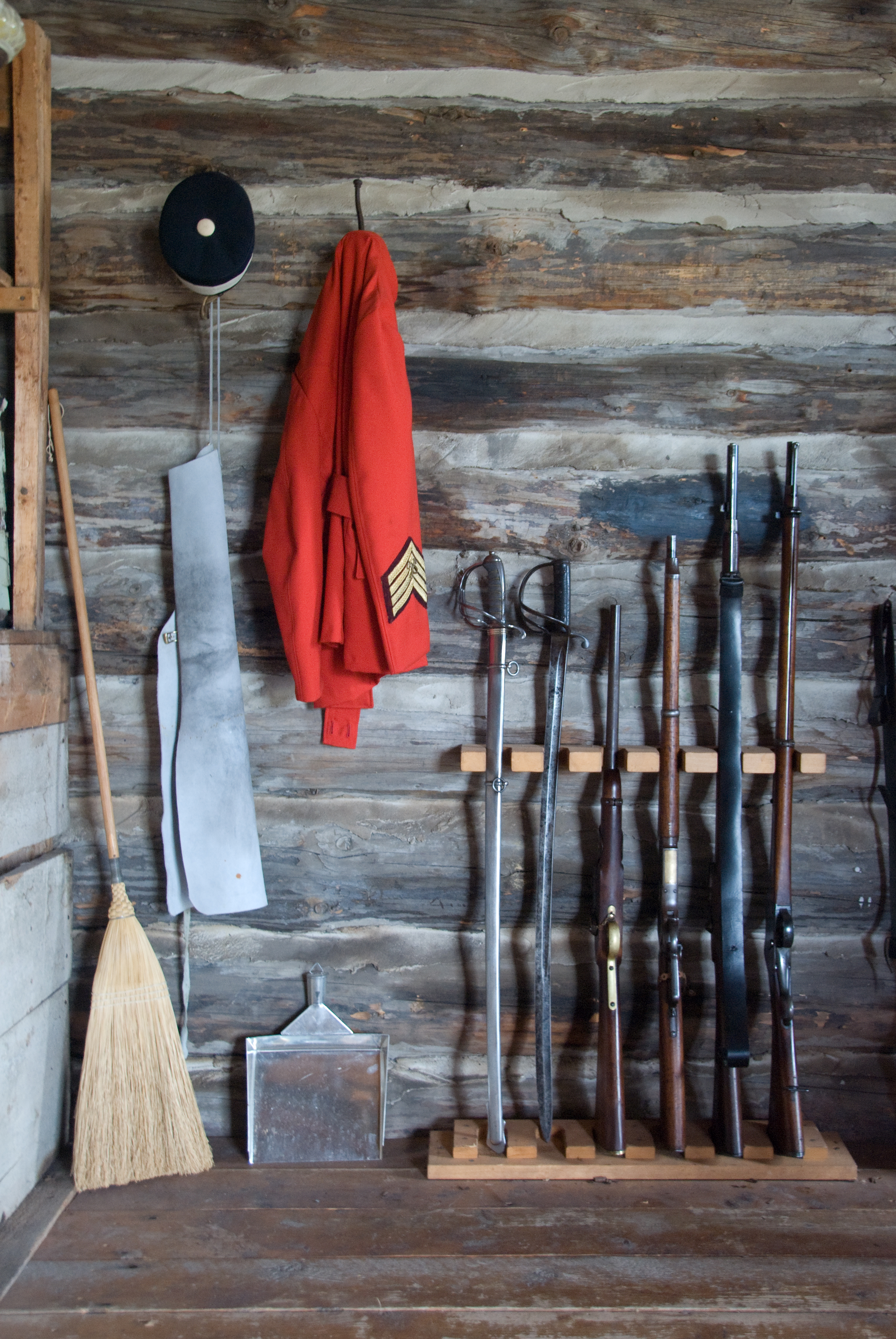
Reconstruction of mounted police weapons and uniform at Fort Walsh

The mounted police were established to be an armed force, primarily due to the perceived threat from the First Nations on the prairies. The police were initially equipped with the Snider-Enfield Carbine Mark III and the Snider-Enfield Short Rifle, but these were single-shot breechloaders, and inferior to the repeating weapons already being used by Indian groups in the United States. These were replaced with the Winchester Model 1876 repeating rifle from 1878 onwards, but the new guns proved quite delicate and did not perform effectively during the 1885 rebellion. In 1895, the force began to replace the ageing Winchesters with the Lee–Metford carbine, but these rifles still used black powder and did not perform as well as hoped. The program was halted and instead the smokeless powder Lee–Enfield—the SMLE (Short Magazine Lee–Enfield Mk I)—was introduced in 1902 as the standard police small arm. The very limited supplies of ammunition held by the force meant that the police had few opportunities to practice with their weapons, and as a result their marksmanship was typically quite poor.

In addition to rifles and carbines, the police also sometimes carried revolvers. The early recruits used Smith & Wesson American Model 3 revolvers and .450 calibre Adams revolvers; Tranter revolvers; the Enfield Mark II revolver was introduced in 1882, but these were felt to be heavy and awkward, and were replaced by the Colt New Service Revolver in 1904. Smaller pocket revolvers, including the Smith & Wesson .38 calibre Revolver, were purchased for use by undercover police officers.

When the force marched west in 1873, it brought twenty-five British Army 1868 pattern lances along on the expedition to impress the Blackfoot First Nation. The force also used swords, with the 1822 pattern British Light Cavalry sabre approved for commissioned officers, and the non-commissioned officers carrying the British 1853 pattern weapon; some constables unofficially equipped themselves with swords, despite Commissioner French having doubts about their utility. The policy around the carrying of these weapons was reviewed in 1880, due to concerns that swords were no longer practical in conflicts with the First Nations. Commissioner Irvine wanted to equip all of his force with swords for use in close quarter combat, while the authorities in Ottawa were opposed to any extension; as a compromise, some 1822 pattern swords were purchased for storage in the police armouries. In 1882, non-commissioned officers were authorized to carry the 1822 pattern sabre, and commissioned police officers adopted the new British 1896 pattern cavalry sword when it was issued a few years later. The mounted police deployed to Siberia at the end of the First World War carried the 1908 pattern cavalry sword.

The force was also equipped with artillery, primarily to deter attacks from the First Nations. In 1873, the force was assigned two 9-pounder (4 kg) Mark I muzzle-loading field guns and two 5.63 calibre brass mortars; a further four brass 7-pounder Mark II field guns were acquired in 1876. Despite requests for the force to be assigned machine-guns, two steel 7-pounder (3 kg) Mark II field guns were allocated instead in 1886, replacing two of the brass guns which were passed on to the militia. The machine-guns finally arrived in 1894, when two .303 calibre Maxim guns were approved for the police, with two more purchased in 1897. A final two bronze 7-pounder guns were donated to the force in 1900 by the Yukon Field Force. The 7-pounders acquired in 1876 saw service in the rebellion of the Métis, and one of these guns, combined with a 9-pounder, was later used to bombard and kill a fugitive member of the Cree First Nation, called Almighty Voice, in 1897.

=== Horses and transport ===
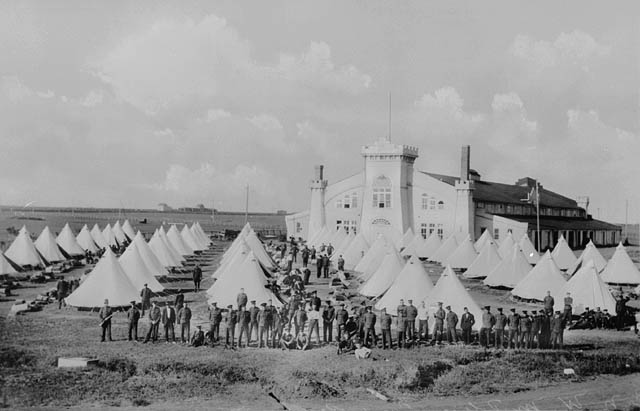
Recruits gathered at the Regina barracks, 1918, showing the large riding school in the background

The mounted police initially deployed with 310 horses in 1873, both as mounts and as draught animals, but large numbers of these died on the march, and for much of the 1870s there were shortages of horses, impacting on the police's work. The importance of horses to the force's work grew, particularly once the new patrol system was introduced by Commissioner Herchmer. By the 1880s the police's horses were looked after carefully and given good veterinarian support, although they were worked very hard. A large riding school was built in Regina at a cost of $30,000 in 1886 to allow training throughout the cold winter months. (Note: The first mounted police riding school at Regina burnt down in 1889, and had to be rebuilt in 1889; this too burned down, in 1920.) At their peak towards the end of the century, the force owned around 800 horses, and needed to purchase 100 new mounts each year. The police initially used a wide range of saddlery, mostly of the British Army's Universal pattern, but this was found to be unsuitable for the prairies. After some experimentation, the force settled on the Western, or Californian, style of saddle in the 1880s, which was more comfortable for both the rider and horse.

The police did not rely solely on horses, using pack ponies and mules to carry equipment and supplies, and using oxen as draught animals in the early years of the force. Dog-sled teams and canoes were also used in the far north.

In the early 20th century, the development of the automobile began to make horses redundant for most police work, with the exception of crowd control. The force purchased its first car, a McLaughlin Model 55, in 1915, and mechanized its border patrols the following year, deploying a range of cars and motorcycles. By 1920, the mounted police owned 33 cars and trucks, and 28 motorcycles. There was a proposal in 1919 to equip the police with surplus wartime aircraft to create an "Air Police Service", but it was turned down by the government.

The mounted police also purchased various boats for work along Canada's coasts and rivers. The Keewatin, a sailing vessel, was bought in 1890 for use on Lake Winnipeg, but it capsized later the same year. In 1902, the steamboat Vidette was acquired to transport the police along the Yukon River, supported by three launches. Redwing, a small steamer, was purchased for transport on Lake Winnipeg in 1905. The police had the Rouville steamer specially constructed for patrolling in the far north in 1906, but tests demonstrated it burnt through too much fuel, and it was never deployed. By 1919, however, the Victory, Duncan, Lady Borden and Chakawana motor vessels were patrolling the far north and the west coast.

=== Suppliers ===
Early on in the force's history, most of its equipment and weapons had to be imported from abroad, due to the lack of domestic Canadian industry. Its early saddlery and wagons were imported from the United States, although the police's uniforms were made locally. After 1887, political pressure grew to use Canadian suppliers whenever possible. Supplies of food and similar goods were initially bought from the major trading companies in the west, such as the Hudson's Bay Company, but this gradually changed once more of the territories were settled and goods could be purchased from smaller, local firms, with the police becoming an important source of business. Equipment and supplies had to be bought from companies that supported the government of the day, and after 1896 a formal list of politically approved suppliers was kept by the comptroller's office. All of the police's guns had to be imported, due to the lack of domestic manufacturers, and by 1890s the force was still buying most of its ammunition from abroad, as Canadian-manufactured cartridges remained substandard.

== Cultural legacy ==
=== Popular media ===
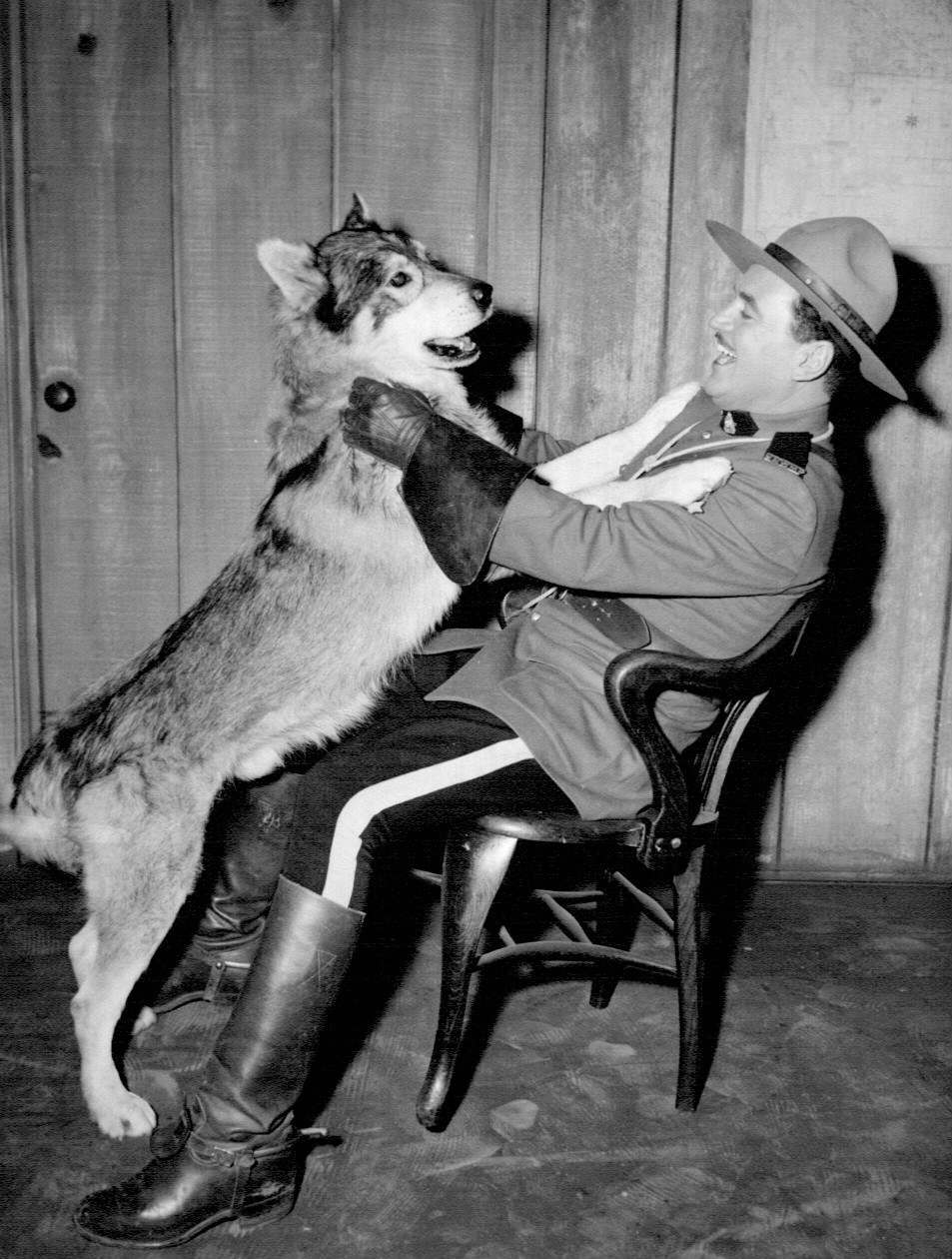
Richard Simmons and Yukon King in 1955, publicizing Sergeant Preston of the Yukon

The early reputation of the force was shaped by journalistic accounts published in the 1880s and 1890s, followed by various biographical accounts written by retired officers. The initial press response to the mounted police was mixed, particularly among Liberal newspapers, and focused on what the historian Michael Dawson describes as accounts of "inefficiency, irresolution and impropriety" within the new organization. In contrast, police memoirs promoted an image of a tough but fair force, focused on maintaining order in the wilderness. Quite quickly, however, a more heroic, romantic tone came to dominate newspaper accounts and a powerful myth was built up around the mounted police. This was reinforced by events such as the mounted police's Musical Ride, performed for the first time in 1887, which entertained the crowds with cavalry charges and displays with lances.

The first appearance of the mounted police in fiction occurred in Joseph Collin's The Story of Louis Riel, published in 1885. The police soon became a popular subject for writers, with over 150 novels about the force and its successor, the RCMP, being published between 1890 and 1940 across North America and Britain, along with magazine articles and publications for children. (Note: The sequence of novels featuring the force in the late-19th century and early-20th centuries were all published in English: there were no French-Canadian novels published during the period that featured a mounted policeman as a hero.) Gilbert Parker, James Curwood and Ralph Connor's works proved particularly popular and influential. Connor's Corporal Cameron, published in 1912, set the tone for many later books with a tale of its initially dissolute protagonist's redemption through service with the police. Numerous poems were written about the force, with the best known probably being the Riders of the Plains, which was first published in 1878 and later expanded upon several times.

These novels used standard characters and plot. The mounted policeman was, as Dawson describes, an Anglo-Saxon, "chivalric, self-abnegating hero", who would pursue his suspect – typically a foreigner or French-Canadian – across a hostile landscape, often overcoming them bloodlessly. The stories championed what the historian Andrew Graybill describes as "Victorian manliness", with the narrative focusing on "romance, manners and the preservation of justice through fair play". Within the genre, some national differences emerged. British writers often portrayed the police as upper-class colonial soldiers, carrying out their duty in serving the British Empire on the fringes of civilization. Canadian novels embraced much of this imperial narrative, but also depicted the force as a protector of wider moral authority and order, forming a reassuring, conservative image in the face of contemporary fears of immigrants and social instability. In contrast, authors in the United States usually reused familiar Western plot-lines, but using Canadian characters and scenery.

During the 1930s and 1940s, the force became the topic of many radio broadcasts and films. Radio series such as the Renfrew of the Mounted and Challenge of the Yukon continued the portrayal of the mounted police as iconic heroes, Challenge later translating onto television in the 1950s as Sergeant Preston of the Yukon. Over 250 films were made about the force in the 20th century, including the highly successful 1936 musical Rose Marie. The popularity of these films finally waned in the 1970s, although this image of the force continued to influence late-20th century television portrayals of the modern RCMP, such as the series Due South which centred on a mounted police constable from the Yukon.

=== Historiography ===
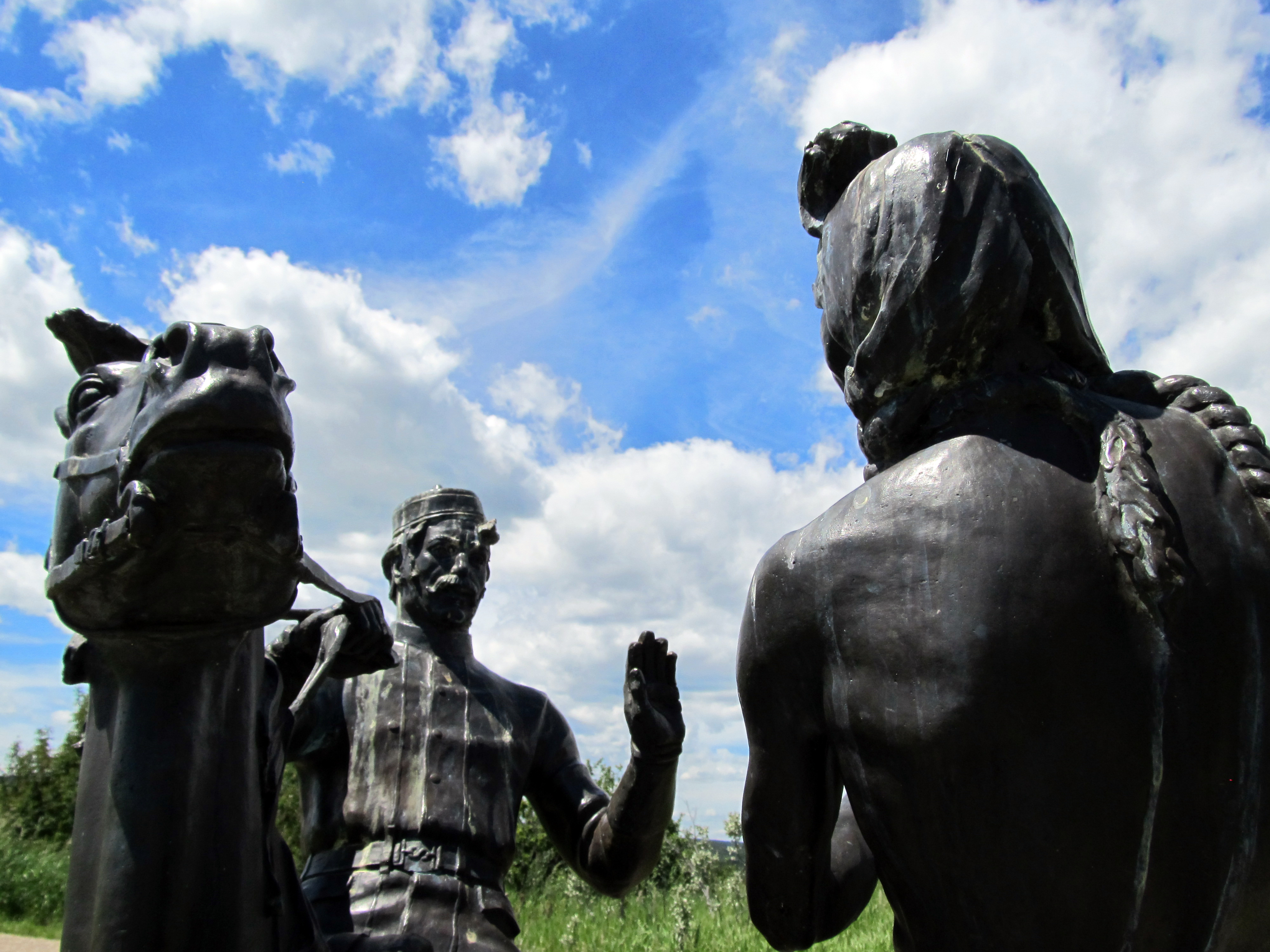
Statue commemorating the meeting of Inspector James Walsh and Sitting Bull in 1877

The extensive historical archives of the RNWMP were combined with those of its successor, the RCMP, in 1920, although the early archives from 1873 to 1885 had been destroyed in a fire in 1897. For most of the 20th century, the RCMP kept most of these historical archives closed, with the material inaccessible except to selected researchers, trusted to maintain a particular perspective on the police's history. Historians had few other sources to work with other than the force's own published annual accounts, autobiographies by members of the police, and popular narratives from the 19th century, and so their works tended to mirror the established image of the mounted police. The resulting histories put forward what the historian William Baker terms as "episodic, nostalgic, eulogistic, antiquarian, non-scholarly, romantic, and heroic" accounts of the force.

This traditional, historical portrayal of the NWMP influenced that of the RCMP, who used their predecessor's history to build their own status as a Canadian national symbol. Although the RCMP as an organization formally dates from 1920, the modern force chose to trace its own history back to the foundation of the mounted police in 1873, rather than, for example, drawing on the Dominion Police's foundation date of 1868. The RCMP's centennial in 1973 saw celebratory events across Canada, various historical publications and even proposals – turned down by the mounted police – for a reenactment of the March West. The RCMP used the celebrations to redefine the early history of the mounted police in line with contemporary policing objectives, focusing on the force's role in shaping the evolution of a liberal, tolerant, modern Canada.

During the early 1970s, professional historians began to reevaluate the force's history. A wider set of themes, including social, race and class issues, began to be analysed, resulting in more challenging histories of the force being published. Legal challenges brought before the Canadian courts in the 1980s resulted in the release of archive material about the force's role in the First World War for the first time, generating further new lines of research on their role in managing labour disputes and overseeing the changing security situation.

== Bibliography ==
- Allen, Douglas W. (2007). "Information Sharing During the Klondike Gold Rush". The Journal of Economic History. 67 (4): 1–24. doi:10.1017/S0022050707000459. S2CID 154301382.
- Atkin, Ronald (1973). Maintain the Right: The Early History of the North West Mounted Police, 1873–1900. London and Basingstoke: Macmillan. ISBN 978-0333122822.
- Backhouse, Frances (1995). Women of the Klondike. Vancouver: Whitecap Books. ISBN 978-1-55110-375-4.
- Baker, William (1998a). "Twenty-five Years After: Mounted Police Historiography Since the 1973–74 Centennial of the Force". In Baker, William (ed.). The Mounted Police and Prairie Society, 1873–1919. Regina: Canadian Plains Research Centre, University of Regina. pp. vii–xvi. ISBN 0889771030.
- Baker, William (1998b). "The Miners and the Mounties: The Royal North-West Mounted Police and the 1906 Lethbridge Strike". In Baker, William (ed.). The Mounted Police and Prairie Society, 1873–1919. Regina: Canadian Plains Research Centre, University of Regina. pp. 137–172. ISBN 0889771030.
- Beahen, William; Horrall, Stan (1998). Red Coats on the Prairies: The North-West Mounted Police, 1886–1900. Regina: Centax Books. ISBN 1894022084.
- Bercuson, David Jay (1990) [1974]. Confrontation at Winnipeg: Labour, Industrial Relations, and the General Strike (revised ed.). Montreal and Kingston: McGill-Queen's University Press. ISBN 0773507949.
- Bercuson, David Jay (2009) [1974]. "The Winnipeg General Strike". In Abella, Irving (ed.). On Strike: Six Key Labour Struggles in Canada 1919–1949. Toronto: James Lorimer and Company. pp. 1–32. ISBN 978-0888620576.
- Berton, Pierre (2001). Klondike: The Last Great Gold Rush 1896–1899. Toronto: Anchor Canada. ISBN 0-385-65844-3.
- Betke, Carl (1998). "Pioneers and Police on the Canadian Prairies, 1885–1914". In Baker, William (ed.). The Mounted Police and Prairie Society, 1873–1919. Regina: Canadian Plains Research Centre, University of Regina. pp. 209–230. ISBN 0889771030.
- Breen, D. H. (1974). "The Mounted Police and the Ranching Frontier". In Dempsey, Hugh A. (ed.). Men in Scarlet. Lincoln, Nebraska: Historical Society of Alberta and McClelland and Stewart West. pp. 115–137. OCLC 635848375.
- Chambers, Ernest. J. (1906). The Royal North-West Mounted Police: A Corps History. Montreal and Ottawa: The Mortimer Press. OCLC 679780396.
- Coates, Ken (1994). "Introduction". In Adney, Tappan (ed.). The Klondike Stampede. Vancouver: University of British Columbia Press. ISBN 0-7748-0489-0.
- Dawson, Michael (1998). The Mountie From Dime Novel to Disney. Toronto: Between the Lines. ISBN 978-1896357164.
- Fetherling, George (1997). The Gold Crusades: A Social History of Gold Rushes, 1849–1929. Toronto: University of Toronto Press. ISBN 978-0-8020-8046-2.
- Francis, Daniel (1997). National Dreams: Myth, Memory, and Canadian History. Vancouver: Arsenal Pulp Press. ISBN 1551520435.
- Gates, Michael (1997). Gold at Fortymile Creek: Early Days in the Yukon. Vancouver: University of British Columbia Press. ISBN 978-0774804929.
- Goldring, Phillip (1979). The First Contingent: The North-West Mounted Police, 1873–74. Ottawa: Parks Canada. ISBN 0-660-00567-0.
- Grad, Kenneth (Spring 2008). "Effective leadership in counter-insurgency : the North-West Mounted Police in South Africa, 1899-1902". Canadian Military Journal. 9 (2): 61–72.
- Graybill, Andrew R. (2007). Policing the Great Plains: Rangers, Mounties, and the North American Frontier, 1875–1910. Lincoln, US: University of Nebraska Press. ISBN 978-0803260023.
- Gywn, Richard (2012). Nation Maker Sir John A. Macdonald: His Life, Our Times. Toronto: Vintage Canada. ISBN 978-0307356451.
- Harrison, Dick (1974). "The Mounted Police in Fiction". In Dempsey, Hugh A. (ed.). Men in Scarlet. Lincoln, Nebraska: Historical Society of Alberta and McClelland and Stewart West. pp. 163–174. OCLC 635848375.
- Harrison, Dick (2004). "Introduction: Selling a Birth-Rite for a Mass of Plottage". In Harrison, Dick (ed.). Best Mounted Police Stories (2nd ed.). Alberta: University of Alberta Press and Lone Pine Publishing. pp. 1–20. ISBN 0888640544.
- Haydon, Arthur L. (1926) [1910]. The Riders of the Plains: A Record of the Royal North-West Mounted Police of Canada (6th ed.). London and New York: Andrew Melrose. OCLC 25798772.
- Hewitt, Steve R. (1997). "Old Myths Die Hard": The Transformation of the Mounted Police in Alberta and Saskatchewan, 1914–1939 (Ph.D.). Saskatoon: University of Saskatchewan.
- Hewitt, Steve R. (1998). "From RNWMP to RCMP: The Power of Myth and the Reality of Transformation". In Baker, William (ed.). The Mounted Police and Prairie Society, 1873–1919. Regina: Canadian Plains Research Centre, University of Regina. pp. 351–362. ISBN 0889771030.
- Hewitt, Steve R. (2002). Spying 101: The RCMP's Secret Activities at Canadian Universities, 1917–1997. Toronto: University of Toronto Press. ISBN 0802041493.
- Horrall, Stanley W. (1973). The Pictorial History of the Royal Canadian Mounted Police. Toronto: McGraw-Hill Ryerson. ISBN 978-0070773660.
- Horrall, Stanley W. (1974). "The March West". In Dempsey, Hugh A. (ed.). Men in Scarlet. Lincoln, Nebraska: Historical Society of Alberta and McClelland and Stewart West. pp. 13–26. OCLC 635848375.
- Horrall, Stanley W. (1998). Baker, William (ed.). The Mounted Police and Prairie Society, 1873–1919. Regina: Canadian Plains Research Centre, University of Regina. ISBN 0889771030.
- Hubner, Brian (1998). "Horse Stealing and the Borderline: The NWMP and the Control of Indian Movement, 1874–1900". In Baker, William (ed.). The Mounted Police and Prairie Society, 1873–1919. Regina: Canadian Plains Research Centre, University of Regina. pp. 53–70. ISBN 0889771030.
- Jennings, John (1974). "The Plains Indians and the Law". In Dempsey, Hugh A. (ed.). Men in Scarlet. Lincoln, Nebraska: Historical Society of Alberta and McClelland and Stewart West. pp. 50–65. OCLC 635848375.
- Kealey, George S. (1998). "The Surveillance State: The Origins of Domestic Intelligence and Counter-subversion in Canada, 1914–1921". In Baker, William (ed.). The Mounted Police and Prairie Society, 1873–1919. Regina: Canadian Plains Research Centre, University of Regina. pp. 325–350. ISBN 0889771030.
- Kuhn, Edgar, ed. (2003). Tributes to the Scarlet Riders: An Anthology of Mountie Poems. Nanooose: Heritage House. ISBN 1894384709.
- Lackenbauer, P. Whitney (2001). "The Military and "Mob Rule": The CEF Riots in Calgary, February 1916". Canadian Military History. 10 (1): 31–42.
- Macleod, R. C. (1976). The North-West Mounted Police and Law Enforcement, 1873–1905. Toronto and Buffalo, US: University of Toronto Press. ISBN 0802053335.
- Marquis, Greg (1993). Policing Canada's Century A History of the Canadian Association of Chiefs of Police. Toronto: University of Toronto Press. ISBN 978-0802050205.
- Marquis, Greg (2005). "Policing Two Imperial Frontiers: The Royal Irish Constabulary and the North-West Mounted Police". In Knafla, Louis A.; Swainger, Jonathan (eds.). The Mounted Police and Prairie Society, 1873–1919. Vancouver and Toronto: University of Columbia Press. pp. 185–210. ISBN 978-0774811668.
- Marsden, Michael T. (1993). "Popular Images of the Canadian Mounted Police and the Texas Rangers". Studies in Popular Culture. 16 (1): 1–14.
- Mayfield, B. J. (1998). "The Interlude: The North-West Mounted Police and the Blackfoot Peoples, 1874–1877". In Baker, William (ed.). The Mounted Police and Prairie Society, 1873–1919. Regina: Canadian Plains Research Centre, University of Regina. pp. 17–40. ISBN 0889771030.
- McCoy, Brendam (2000). "Snapshots from the South African War: The F. C. Cantrill Photograph Collection at the Canadian War Museum". Canadian Military History. 9 (2): 72–81.
- McIntyre, Kyle (1997). "'Sons of Good Western Stock': The South African War Artefacts of Private Alexander W. Stewart". Canadian Military History. 6 (1): 84–91.
- Miller, Carman (1993). Painting the Map Red Canada and the South African War, 1899–1902. Montreal: McGill University Press. ISBN 978-0773509139.
- Morrison, William Robert (1974). "The North-West Mounted Police and the Klondike Gold Rush". Journal of Contemporary History. 9 (2): 93–105. doi:10.1177/002200947400900204. S2CID 159897122.
- Morrison, William Robert (1985). Showing the Flag: The Mounted Police and Canadian Sovereignty in the North, 1894–1925. Vancouver: University of British Columbia Press. ISBN 978-0-7748-0245-1.
- Morton, Desmond (1998). "Cavalry or Police: Keeping the Peace on Two Adjacent Frontiers, 1870–1900". In Baker, William (ed.). The Mounted Police and Prairie Society, 1873–1919. Regina: Canadian Plains Research Centre, University of Regina. pp. 3–16. ISBN 0889771030.
- Porsild, Charlene (1998). Gamblers and Dreamers: Women, Men, and Community in the Klondike. Vancouver: University of British Columbia Press. ISBN 0-7748-0650-8.
- Ross, David; May, Robin (1988). The Royal Canadian Mounted Police, 1873–1987. London: Osprey. ISBN 978-0850458343.
- Stanley, George F. G. (1974). "The Man Who Sketched the Great March". In Dempsey, Hugh A. (ed.). Men in Scarlet. Lincoln, Nebraska: Historical Society of Alberta and McClelland and Stewart West. pp. 27–49. OCLC 635848375.
- Tranquilla, Ronald (1990). "Ranger and Mountie: Myths of National Identity in Zane Grey's The Lone Star Ranger and Ralph Connor's Corporal Cameron". Journal of Popular Culture. 24 (3): 69–80. doi:10.1111/j.0022-3840.1990.2403_69.x.
- Wilson, Fay (2016). "Booze, Temperance, and Soldiers on the Home Front: The Unraveling of the Image of the Idealised Soldier in Canada". Canadian Military History. 25 (1): 1–36.
- Winslow, Kathryn (1952). Big Pan-Out: The Klondike Story. London: Phoenix House. OCLC 465425340.
- Wright, Allen A. (1976). Prelude to Bonanza: The Discovery and Exploration of the Yukon. Sidney, Canada: Gray's Publishing. ISBN 0888260628.
- Zaslow, Morris (1971). The Opening of the Canadian North, 1870–1914. Toronto: McClelland and Steward. ISBN 0771090803.
