= Anerley (disambiguation) =

Anerley is a district of South East London, England, U.K.

Anerley may also refer to:

- Anerley, Saskatchewan, a small hamlet in Canada
- Anerley, South Africa, a town in South Africa
- Anerley railway station, a station of the London Overground located in south London, England, U.K.
- SS Anerley, a British cargo ship built in 1910, renamed SS Southborough in 1913, and sunk by a German submarine in 1918

== See also ==
- Annerley, Queensland, Australia, a suburb of Brisbane
