= Anerley, Saskatchewan =

Anerley
- Unincorporated community
- Location within Saskatchewan
- Coordinates: 51.220°N 107.190°W
- Country: Canada
- Province: Saskatchewan
- Region: Southwest Saskatchewan
- Census division: 15
- Rural Municipality: Fertile Valley
- Established: 1908
- Incorporated (Village): 1912

Population (2006)
  - Total: 12
- Time zone: CST
- Area code: 306
- Waterways: Anerley Lakes; Milden Lake; Stockwell Lake

Anerley is an unincorporated community in the western region of Saskatchewan located about 4 km north of Highway 44, about 20 km southwest of the Outlook and is about 125 km south west of Saskatoon.

== History ==
Anerley before the railway was a well-established community, but when the Canadian Northern Railway laid down tracks from Saskatoon, the post office and Anerley School district were skidded into the town site by a large steam-powered tractor. The school had been on the site where Hillcrest Cemetery is now located. During the move sparks from the tractor started a small prairie fire, that was soon put out by the townsfolk.

In 1912 the Canadian Northern Railway (later Canadian National Railway) brought in lines from Saskatoon, soon after the first two grain elevators were built. A third elevator was built in 1928 by Saskatchewan Wheat Pool.

== Notable people ==
William Higgitt (November 10, 1917 – April 2, 1989) was the 15th Royal Canadian Mounted Police (RCMP) commissioner (October 1, 1969 – December 28, 1973; succeeding Malcolm Lindsay) and president of the International Criminal Police Organization (Interpol) (1972–1976; succeeding Paul Dickopf).

== See also ==
- List of communities in Saskatchewan
