= Gerry Weiner =

Canadian politician

The Honourable Gerry Weiner PC

Mayor of Dollard-des-Ormeaux, Quebec
- In office 1982–1984
- Preceded by: Jean Cournoyer
- Succeeded by: Ed Janiszewski

Member of Parliament for Dollard
- In office 1984–1988
- Preceded by: Louis Desmarais
- Succeeded by: District was abolished in 1987.

Member of Parliament for Pierrefonds—Dollard
- In office 1988–1993
- Preceded by: District was created in 1987.
- Succeeded by: Bernard Patry

Personal details
- Born: June 26, 1933 (age 93) Montreal, Quebec, Canada
- Party: Progressive Conservative (Federal)

Gerald "Gerry" Weiner, PC (born June 26, 1933) is a Canadian politician.

== Biography ==
A pharmacist educated at McGill University and the Université de Montréal, Weiner entered local politics and eventually became mayor of Dollard-des-Ormeaux, Quebec in 1982. He was a Progressive Conservative candidate in the 1984 election, winning a seat in the House of Commons of Canada as Member of Parliament for Dollard, Quebec in the Tory landslide that brought Brian Mulroney to power.

After serving for two years as a parliamentary secretary, Weiner was promoted to Prime Minister Mulroney's Cabinet as Minister of State for immigration.

He was re-elected as MP for the new riding of Pierrefonds—Dollard in the 1988 election. In 1989, he became Secretary of State for Canada. In 1988, he became Minister of State for Multiculturalism and served in that position until 1991. From 1990 to 1993, he was Minister of Multiculturalism and Citizenship in the cabinets of Mulroney and his successor Kim Campbell. He lost his seat in the 1993 election that also defeated the Campbell government and reduced the Tories to two seats.

Weiner entered provincial politics, serving as president of the Equality Party, which was a party advocating the rights of anglophones in Quebec. In 1998, he was elected to the city council in Montreal as a member of the Vision Montreal party and a supporter of Mayor Pierre Bourque. Weiner served on the city's executive committee.

Since 2017, Weiner has transitioned back to the private sector, as an Executive Director at APS Global Partners Inc. This esteemed business consulting company specializes in the Canadian Start-Up Visa program, facilitating the growth and success of aspiring entrepreneurs. Weiner continues to practice as a pharmacist in Montreal. He is currently the president of the board of directors for The Centre For Literacy of Quebec; the national vice-president of the Friends of Haifa University; the chair of the board of directors of the Old Port of Montreal Corporation; a member board of directors of Mount Sinai Hospital and member of the board of directors of the Canada-India Business Council.

== Electoral record ==
1993 Canadian federal election: Pierrefonds—Dollard
Party	Candidate	Votes	%	Expenditures
Liberal	Bernard Patry	39,974	64.98	$32,857
Bloc Québécois	René de Cotret Opzoomer	10,712	17.41	$16,510
Progressive Conservative	Gerry Weiner	8,106	13.18	$35,655
New Democratic	Catherine J. Rideout-Erais	864	1.40	$117
Natural Law	Ruby Finkelstein	480	0.78	$626
National	Carlos Roldan	474	0.77	$2,105
Libertarian	Hugh Rowe	410	0.67	$0
Equality	Lionel Albert	386	0.63	$5,004
Commonwealth of Canada	Glenford Charles	108	0.18	$0
Total valid votes		61,514	100.00	
Rejected, unmarked and declined ballots		925		
Turnout		62,439	81.01	
Electors on the lists		77,076		
Source: Thirty-fifth General Election, 1993: Official Voting Results, Published by the Chief Electoral Officer of Canada. Financial figures taken from official contributions and expenses provided by Elections Canada.

1988 Canadian federal election
Party	Candidate	Votes	%
Progressive Conservative	Gerry Weiner	27,532	49.77
Liberal	Bernard Patry	22,244	40.21
New Democratic	Pierre Razik	3,854	6.97
Rhinoceros	Jean-François Lafond	856	1.55
Independent	William Short	452	0.82
Libertarian	Hugh Rowe	302	0.55
Commonwealth of Canada	Michel Haddad	77	0.14
Total valid votes		55,317	100.00

1984 Canadian federal election
Party	Candidate	Votes
Progressive Conservative	Gerry Weiner	26,076
Liberal	Louis Desmarais	21,451
New Democratic	Sid Ingerman	6,619
Rhinoceros	Rita Constantin-Truba	1,247
Parti nationaliste	Gisèle Hurtubise	978
Libertarian	Hugh Rowe	381
Commonwealth of Canada	Pascal Galasso	104

Political offices
Preceded by The office was created in 1991.	Minister of Multiculturalism and Citizenship; 1991–1993	Succeeded by The office was abolished in 1993.
