= Guy Rouleau (politician) =

Canadian politician

Member of Parliament for Dollard
- In office 10 August 1953 – 31 July 1965
- Preceded by: Riding created
- Succeeded by: Jean-Pierre Goyer

Personal details
- Born: 19 February 1923 Montreal, Quebec, Canada
- Died: 7 October 2010 (aged 87)
- Party: Liberal
- Profession: Lawyer

Guy Rouleau (19 February 1923 – 7 October 2010) was a Liberal party member of the House of Commons of Canada. He was a lawyer by career.

He was first elected at the Dollard riding in the 1953 general election and re-elected for successive terms in 1957, 1958, 1962 and 1963, but his term in the Liberal caucus ended on 31 July 1965 before his term in the 26th Canadian Parliament ended. Rouleau did not seek further re-election after this.

Rouleau became Parliamentary Secretary to Prime Minister Lester B. Pearson in February 1964. However, he was embroiled in a scandal in which Pearson's government was accused of bribery regarding attempts to secure bail for drug trafficker Lucien Rivard. The scandal affected numerous government careers, including that of Rouleau whose role as the Prime Minister's Secretary ended on 23 November 1964.
