= Marie-Josée Kravis =

Canadian businesswoman and philanthropist

Marie-Josée Kravis OC
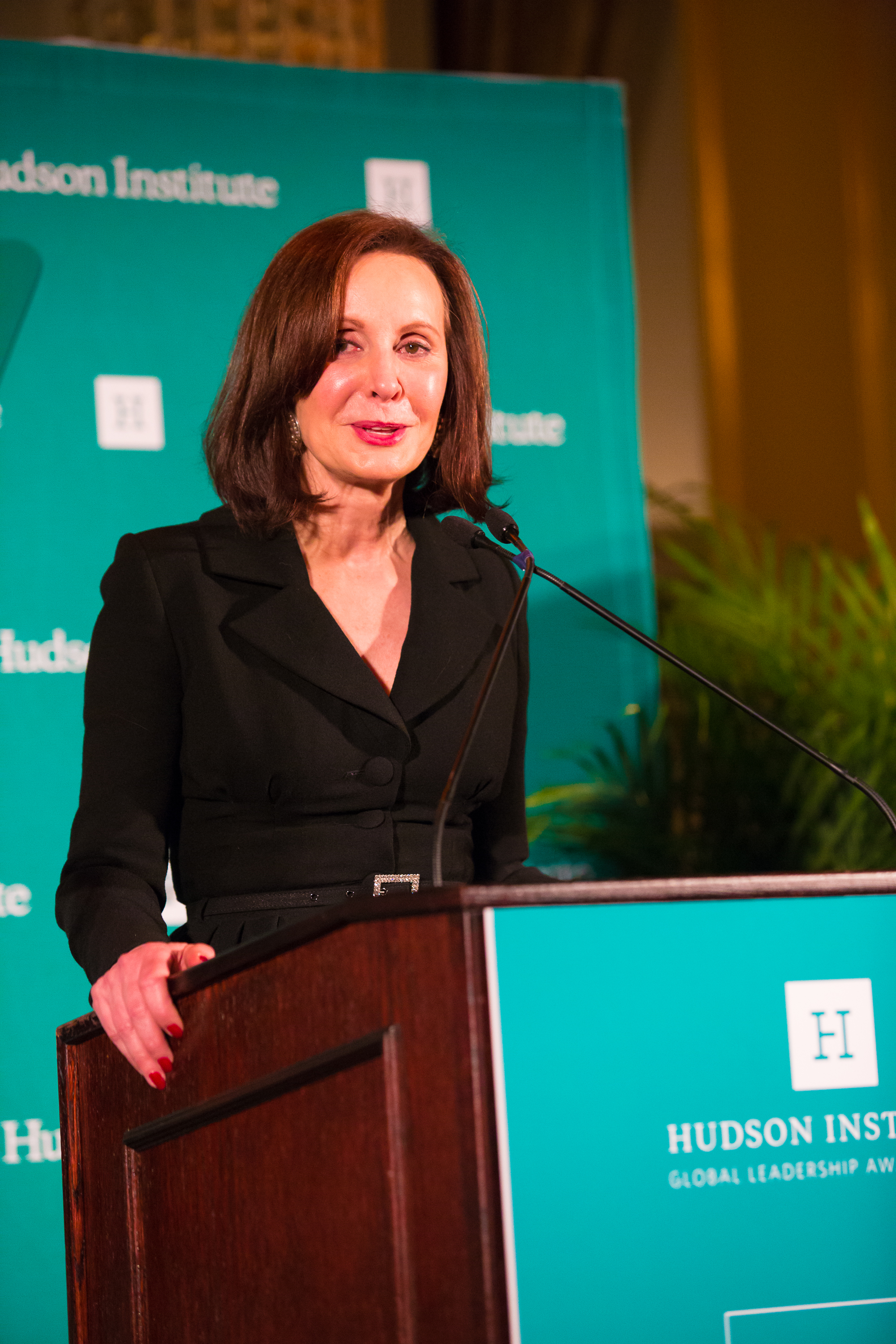
- Kravis in 2015
- Born: Marie-Josée Drouin; 11 September 1949 (age 77); Ottawa, Ontario, Canada
- Education: University of Ottawa
- Occupations: Businesswoman, philanthropist
- Spouses: Charles Dutoit (m. 1982, divorced); Henry Kravis (m. 1994)

Marie-Josée Kravis (née Drouin; born 11 September 1949) is a Canadian businesswoman and philanthropist. In 1994, she was appointed as an Officer of the Order of Canada. In 2006, she received the Légion d'honneur from the French government.

== Early life and education ==
Marie-Josée Drouin was born in Ottawa, Ontario, Canada. Of French and English parentage, she was the youngest of seven children. She earned an MA in economics from the University of Ottawa.

== Career ==
She serves on the international advisory board of the Federal Reserve Bank of New York and on the boards of LVMH, MoMA and Publicis S.A and was involved in a number of Canadian boardrooms throughout the 1980s. She began her career as the special executive assistant to a federal cabinet minister, Jean-Pierre Goyer, and then went to work for Herman Kahn's Hudson Institute. She was also Goyer's mistress and he described her as his "common law wife" even through he was already married. Some controversy ensured when it was revealed that Goyer had awarded her a free pass with the Crown-owned Air Canada airline, allowing her to fly for free anywhere in the world, which Goyer justified under the grounds that she was his "common law wife". From 1971 to 1984 she was a consultant to the Hudson Institute of New York and executive director of the Hudson Institute of Canada. Her office at the headquarters of the Hudson Institute of Canada in Montreal was described was located in a well furnished house, but she stated she planned on moving to a more grand location once it was rented.

In a 1974 interview, she stated that the Hudson Institute took a "modular approach" by hiring several experts on short-term contracts to write its reports on various political, social and economic problems and did not have a large full-time staff. In the same interview she stated: "When we studied racial tensions in the United States, we hired several Harlem Globetrotters. Kahn likes to say 'we're really crackpots'-sometimes we're on the government's side and sometimes we're not. If we have to say the Emperor has no clothes, we say it. We would like to do more studies on Canadian problems and we generally think the outlook is quite favorable for Canada". About Kahn's plans for a "Great Lakes of South America" to be created by damming up the Amazon river and flooding Amazonia, she was described as being "unpleasantly surprised" when the subject was brought up and tried to distance herself from the plan.

She has served on the boards of CIBC, the Ford Motor Company, the Standard Life Insurance Co., Hasbro Inc., Hollinger International, Vivendi Universal and IAC/InterActiveCorp. She was a board member at Conrad Black's Hollinger International until late 2003. Black was later charged with fraud and obstruction of justice. Kravis was called as a witness at Black's trial in 2007 and testified that she had been unaware of the corporate malfeasance during her tenure. Additionally, she previously served as vice-chair of Canada's Royal Commission on National Passenger Transportation and co-chaired a national commission on prosperity and competitiveness. She served on the binational dispute settlement panel established under the NAFTA agreement. She is a member of the Steering Committee of the Bilderberg Group.

=== Media ===
She has been a regular columnist for La Presse, the Montreal Gazette and the Financial Post of Canada, and she has contributed to the Wall Street Journal and numerous other publications. She hosted a weekly television show on the public television network TV Ontario. She is also the author with B. Bruce-Briggs of Canada Has a Future and with Maurice Ernst and Jimmy Wheeler of Western Europe: Adjusting to Structural Change.

=== Philanthropy ===
Together with Henry R. Kravitz, her husband, she is ranked the 25th highest donating individual according to The Chronicle of Philanthropy. Their primary focuses have been in arts and culture and medicine. In other fields, she sits on the board of the Institute for Advanced Study in Princeton, New Jersey. She is a senior fellow at the Hudson Institute and a member of the Council on Foreign Relations.

==== Arts and culture ====
Among the cultural organizations they have supported are: Lincoln Center for the Performing Arts and the New York Philharmonic Orchestra, where they established a composer-in-residence program and the Marie-Josée Kravis Prize for New Music, one of the largest new-music prizes. At the Museum of Modern Art, whose board she joined in 1994, she served as Board President from July 2005 – 2018 and as of July 2021 she replaced Leon Black as Board Chair. She is also a supporter of the Metropolitan Opera, the Tate Museum and Somerset House, London. She is a board member of the Qatar Museums Authority and a member of the International Council of the Prado Museum.

==== Medicine ====
She chairs the selection committee of The Henry R. Kravis Prize in Nonprofit Leadership, which is awarded for innovations in non-profit work. At the Mount Sinai Medical Center, she serves as a major patron and with her husband has given close to $30 million for heart research. At the Sloan Kettering Institute, she and her husband established a chair in Human Oncology and Pathogenesis in 2006. In 2013 with a gift of $100 million they established a Center for Molecular Oncology at Memorial Sloan Kettering Cancer Center. She also serves as vice-chair of the Memorial Sloan Kettering Cancer Center and chair of the Sloan Kettering Institute.

== Personal life ==
In the 1970s, she was linked to Jean-Pierre Goyer, a minister in the government of Pierre Trudeau. She married Montreal Symphony conductor Charles Dutoit in 1982; they subsequently divorced. In 1994, she became the third wife of billionaire financier Henry Kravis. The Kravises have homes in New York City; Southampton, New York; Meeker, Colorado; Palm Beach, Florida; and Paris, France. Their principal residence is a Park Avenue triplex.

== Books and articles ==
- Pratt, Larry; Davis, Robert; Zannis, Mark; Block, Irvin (1974). Robert Chodos, Rae Murphy (ed.). Let Us Prey The Practices and Profits of Canadian Corporations and Businessmen. Toronto: James Lormier. pp. 108–120.
