= Dollard (electoral district) =

Former federal electoral district in Quebec, Canada

Quebec electoral district

Defunct federal electoral district
- Legislature: House of Commons
- District created: 1952
- District abolished: 1987
- First contested: 1953
- Last contested: 1984

Dollard (French pronunciation: [dɔlaʁ]) was a federal electoral district in Quebec, Canada, which was represented in the House of Commons from 1953 to 1988. It was held continuously by a Liberal MP until 1984, when Gerry Weiner of the Progressive Conservative Party won the seat for one term up to its abolishment.

== History ==
This riding was created in 1952 from parts of Laval and Mount Royal.

In 1966, it was defined to consist of:

- the City of Saint-Laurent;
- the Towns of Dollard-des-Ormeaux and Roxboro;
- two parts of the City of Pierrefonds, one situated northeast of the Town of Roxboro, and the other bounded on one side by Des Prairies River and on the three other sides by the Town of Roxboro;
- the part of the City of Montreal bounded by a line commencing at the intersection of the Montreal-Laurentians Autoroute and Des Prairies River; east following the Autoroute to the northwestern limit of the City of Saint-Laurent; along the limit with the City of Montreal to the northeastern limit of the City of Pierrefonds; northwest along that limit to Des Prairies River; and back to the Autoroute.

In 1976, it was redefined to consist of:

- the Towns of Dollard-des-Ormeaux and Roxboro;
- those two parts of the City of Pierrefonds, one part lying northeast of the Towns of Dollard-des-Ormeaux and Roxboro, and the other part bounded on one side by des Prairies River and on the other three sides by the Town of Roxboro;
- the part of the City of Saint-Laurent bounded by a line commencing at the intersection of the northwestern limit of the Town of Mount Royal and the track of the Canadian National Railways Company; northwest along the track and the border between the City of Saint-Laurent and the City of Montreal to the northeastern limit of the City of Pierrefonds; along the limit separating the City of Saint-Laurent from the City of Pierrefonds, the Town of Dollard-des-Ormeaux, the City of Dorval, the City of Lachine, the City of Côte-Saint-Luc, the City of Montreal and the Town of Mount Royal to the point of commencement.

It was abolished in 1987 when it was redistributed into Pierrefonds—Dollard and Saint-Laurent—Cartierville ridings.

== Members of Parliament ==
This riding elected the following members of Parliament:

Parliament	Years	Member	Party
Dollard; Riding created from Laval and Mount Royal
22nd	1953–1957	Guy Rouleau	Liberal
23rd	1957–1958	Guy Rouleau	Liberal
24th	1958–1962	Guy Rouleau	Liberal
25th	1962–1963	Guy Rouleau	Liberal
26th	1963–1965	Guy Rouleau	Liberal
27th	1965–1968	Jean-Pierre Goyer	Liberal
28th	1968–1972	Jean-Pierre Goyer	Liberal
29th	1972–1974	Jean-Pierre Goyer	Liberal
30th	1974–1979	Jean-Pierre Goyer	Liberal
31st	1979–1980	Louis Desmarais	Liberal
32nd	1980–1984	Louis Desmarais	Liberal
33rd	1984–1988	Gerry Weiner	Progressive Conservative
Riding dissolved into Pierrefonds—Dollard and Saint-Laurent

== Election results ==
1953 Canadian federal election
Party	Candidate	Votes
Liberal	Guy Rouleau	14,964
Progressive Conservative	Georges-P. Laurin	7,320
Co-operative Commonwealth	Hilary Comeau	579
Labor–Progressive	Irving Burman	363

1957 Canadian federal election
Party	Candidate	Votes
Liberal	Guy Rouleau	21,917
Progressive Conservative	Renaud Masson	7,813
Co-operative Commonwealth	Viateur St-Jean	2,197

1958 Canadian federal election
Party	Candidate	Votes
Liberal	Guy Rouleau	18,760
Progressive Conservative	Maurice Cousineau	16,677
Co-operative Commonwealth	Viateur St-Jean	1,742
Social Credit	Dollard Richard	1,063

1962 Canadian federal election
Party	Candidate	Votes
Liberal	Guy Rouleau	21,802
Progressive Conservative	Clément Brown	10,227
New Democratic	J.-Émile Boudreau	4,288
Social Credit	Dollard Richard	2,727

1963 Canadian federal election
Party	Candidate	Votes
Liberal	Guy Rouleau	23,764
New Democratic	J.-Émile Boudreau	6,342
Social Credit	Lucien Mallette	4,938
Progressive Conservative	Dollard Desautels	4,693
Independent Liberal	Aimé Caron	1,320

1965 Canadian federal election
Party	Candidate	Votes
Liberal	Jean-Pierre Goyer	22,496
New Democratic	Paul-Émile Trudel	9,041
Progressive Conservative	Jacques Le Blanc	6,996
Ralliement créditiste	Venant Lebeault	2,452

1968 Canadian federal election
Party	Candidate	Votes
Liberal	Jean-Pierre Goyer	34,146
New Democratic	Charles Taylor	10,485
Progressive Conservative	Ronald Léger	2,391
Ralliement créditiste	Yvette Hamel	287

1972 Canadian federal election
Party	Candidate	Votes
Liberal	Jean-Pierre Goyer	38,984
Progressive Conservative	Barry Jackson	9,511
New Democratic	Kari Levitt	8,111
Independent	Daniel Waterlot	1,053

1974 Canadian federal election
Party	Candidate	Votes
Liberal	Jean-Pierre Goyer	37,088
Progressive Conservative	Lynda Moffet	9,979
New Democratic	Gabor Zinner	5,746
Social Credit	P.S. Hele-Hambly	1,890
Marxist–Leninist	Robert Verrier	252

1979 Canadian federal election
Party	Candidate	Votes
Liberal	Louis Desmarais	43,294
Progressive Conservative	Richard B. Holden	6,208
New Democratic	Pierre Bourgeois	3,949
Social Credit	Lucien St-Laurent	1,801
Rhinoceros	René Verrier	793
Libertarian	Hugh Rowe	154
Union populaire	Marc A.R. Guindon	143
Marxist–Leninist	Paul Lévesque	64
Communist	Nicolaos Kotsornithis	58

1980 Canadian federal election
Party	Candidate	Votes	%
Liberal	Louis Desmarais	37,860	76.45
New Democratic	Pierre Bourgeois	5,767	11.65
Progressive Conservative	Bruce Hunter	5,303	10.71
Union populaire	Monique Raiche	285	0.58
Libertarian	Hugh Rowe	170	0.34
Marxist–Leninist	Paul Lévesque	138	0.27

1984 Canadian federal election
Party	Candidate	Votes	%	±%
Progressive Conservative	Gerry Weiner	26,076	45.86	+35.15
Liberal	Louis Desmarais	21,451	37.73	-38.72
New Democratic	Sid Ingerman	6,619	11.65	-
Rhinoceros	Rita Constantin-Truba	1,247	2.19	-
Parti nationaliste	Gisèle Hurtubise	978	1.72	+1.14
Libertarian	Hugh Rowe	381	0.67	+0.33
Commonwealth of Canada	Pascal Galasso	104	0.18	-

== See also ==
- List of Canadian electoral districts
- Historical federal electoral districts of Canada
