= Jean-Pierre Goyer =

Canadian politician

The Honourable Jean-Pierre Goyer PC QC
- Official 1974 portrait

Member of the Canadian Parliament for Dollard
- In office 1965–1978
- Preceded by: Guy Rouleau
- Succeeded by: Louis Desmarais

Personal details
- Born: January 17, 1932 Saint-Laurent, Quebec, Canada
- Died: May 24, 2011 (aged 79)
- Party: Liberal
- Spouse(s): Michelle Gascon; Nicole
- Education: University of Montreal
- Occupation: politician
- Profession: lawyer

Jean-Pierre Goyer, PC QC (January 17, 1932 – May 24, 2011) was a lawyer and Canadian Cabinet minister.

== Early life and education ==
Goyer was born in Saint-Laurent, Quebec, the son of Gilbert and Marie-Ange Goyer. His wealthy family owned a coal distribution company in Montreal. He was educated at two collèges classiques, the College St. Laurent and the College Ste. Marie. Goyer received the standard education of the French-Canadian grande bourgeoisie at the collèges classiques with a strong emphasis on French, Catholic theology, the classics, and math. He graduated from the University of Montreal in 1953. His first wife was Michelle Gascon, by whom he had three daughters. In the 1970s he was linked to the economist Marie-Josée Drouin, whom he described as his "common-law wife", even through he was married to Gascon at the time.

== MP ==
=== 1965 - 1968 term ===
Goyer was first elected to the House of Commons of Canada as the Liberal Party of Canada Member of Parliament for Dollard in the 1965 election. In 1967, when the Liberal Prime Minister Lester B. Pearson announced his intention to resign, Goyer was part of the team that supported the bid of the Justice Minister Pierre Trudeau to win the leadership of the Liberal party. There had been rumors for some time that Pearson-widely considered to be a lackluster leader presiding over a chaotic minority government-would resign in the near-future and ever since 1967 the media had been speculating that Trudeau-who was regarded as a star minister in Pearson's cabinet-would be his successor. Pearson had been prime minister since 1963, but he was unable to win a majority in two successive general elections in 1963 and 1965. Pearson was widely viewed as an inept leader who blundered from disaster to disaster, and most Liberals had long wanted Pearson to retire, leading to internal pressure for the prime minister to step down. Pearson had wanted to stay on to preside over the events of the centennial year of 1967, and with 1967 almost over Pearson had no more reason to stay on. Marc Lalonde, one of Trudeau's closest advisers recalled: "He [Goyer] was the first MP to rally for Trudeau's candidacy and he was actively involved in Trudeau's leadership campaign". The journalist Catherine Fogarty described Goyer as an intelligent and a very ambitious MP who was the first Liberal MP to back Trudeau, a decision that she credited to Goyer's burning ambition to be promoted up to the cabinet instead of languishing as a backbencher. On 15 December 1967, the day after Pearson announced he would be resigning as prime minister in 1968, Goyer attended a secret meeting in Ottawa alongside Marc Lalonde, Michael Pitfield, Pierre Lavasseur, and André Ouellet to found a campaign organization for Trudeau.

On 26 January 1968, a Liberal policy convention was held at the Place Bonaventure in Montreal. The convention was regarded as a chance for Trudeau-who had still not declared himself a candidate-to advance his ideas and show how he would be a different prime minister from Pearson. Goyer as chairman of the Liberal policy committee scheduled a debate about changes to the British North America Act (the constitution of Canada), an issue that Trudeau favored. This was especially the case as the Quebec premier Daniel Johnson Sr. had just proposed for a dramatic devolution of power from the federal government to the provinces; Quebec separatism was becoming popular; and René Lévesque had just founded the Parti Québécois to champion separatism, making it imperative that Trudeau being seen as someone with ideas about how to address national unity. Goyer prepared a resolution calling for the British North America Act to be amended to declare Canada a bilingual nation with English and French to have equal status in all provinces; to declare that the federal government had the right to legislate for social policy; and for a bill of rights to be added to the BNA Act to protect the rights of minorities. The resolution passed, but the Liberal delegates then passed another resolution that called for the end of the monarchy as the resolution stated that Canada should become a republic by 1969, a resolution that Trudeau promptly disallowed. The resolution calling for a Canadian republic was widely mocked as a cheap and easy attempt to appeal to Quebec separatists by abolishing the monarchy, which separatists had attacked as a humiliating "colonial" symbol. Trudeau told the media that the monarchy was merely a "symbol" and he intended to advance policies that would improve the lives of ordinary French-Canadians, rather than being fixtured on a "symbol" that did not impact the lives of ordinary people. The convention was considered a triumph as Trudeau and his supporters such as Goyer who were widely viewed as presenting a plausible alternative to the visions of Johnson and Lévesque.

Goyer had promised Trudeau that over 50 Liberal MPs and senators from Quebec would show up at a meeting on 15 February 1968 to show their support for Trudeau as Pearson's successor. Goyer had further told Trudeau that 80% of the Liberal MPs from Quebec would support him, a figure that was based on fantasy as in fact during the leadership race 50% of the Quebec Liberal MPs supported other candidates. Despite Goyer's promises, only 20 MPs and senators actually attended the meeting, which reflected resentment over Trudeau's rapid rise in politics at the expense of many longer-serving Liberals. Trudeau had been elected an MP in a 1965 by-election and many felt that it was a premature move to have someone with only 3 years' political experience serve as prime minister. Trudeau nearly abandoned his leadership bid as a result of the fiasco, but changed his mind when Goyer reassured him that he was popular with the Liberal rank-and-file. Goyer assured Trudeau that he would have the support of about 600-750 delegates at a leadership convention, which would put him within striking distance of winning the leadership as winning would require having the support of about 1, 200 delegates. The strongest factor in favor of Trudeau over his rivals such as Paul Martin Sr. and Mitchell Sharp was the belief that Trudeau was the best man to handle national unity at a time when there were widespread fears that Canada might break up. Goyer was tireless in arguing that Trudeau should be the next Liberal leader by claiming he was the only man who could save the country. On 16 February 1968, Trudeau called a press conference to formally announce his leadership bid. Goyer served as the floor manager for the Trudeau campaign at the leadership convention where Trudeau was elected the Liberal leader.

=== 1968 re-election ===
He was re-elected in the 1968 election. During the October crisis in 1970, Goyer was known as a "hawk" who advised Trudeau to invoke the War Measures Act, saying that the FLQ was on the brink of launching a revolutionary war in Canada. In December 1970, he was appointed to the Cabinet as Solicitor General of Canada by Prime Minister Pierre Trudeau. In this position, he oversaw the Royal Canadian Mounted Police in the aftermath of the FLQ Crisis.

== The Solicitor General ==
=== FLQ Crisis ===
The October crisis is regarded by historians as the effective end of the FLQ, but at the time it was widely believed to be just the beginning of an era of terrorism in Canada. The full extent that the murder of the Quebec Labor Minister Pierre Laporte had alienated Quebecois public opinion from the FLQ was not appreciated at the time, and the Trudeau government in late 1970-early 1971 saw itself under siege. The Trudeau cabinet had an ambivalent relationship with the RCMP. Traditionally, the Mounties tended to ascribe to a right-wing political views and saw the Liberal Party as being "soft on Communism" with Trudeau himself being investigated by the RCMP as a possible Communist and Soviet spy in the early 1950s. On the other hand, the Trudeau government saw the FLQ as and more broadly New Left movements in general as "the enemy" whom the RCMP needed to crush. The student uprisings at Simon Fraser University in Burnaby in 1968 and at Sir George Williams University in Montreal in 1969 were seen by the Trudeau government as possible beginning of a revolutionary movement. Goyer as Solicitor-General was mvery much on the side of the RCMP and in cabinet meetings constantly urged that the RCMP be given more power to combat the FLQ.

Both Goyer and Trudeau proved adapt at deflecting questions in the House of Commons about the RCMP's campaign against the "radicals" by claiming that the government had no control over the RCMP, and as such they were not responsible for anything the RCMP did. However, Goyer was unhappy that John Kennett Starnes, the director of the RCMP security service, had a "direct line" to Trudeau and by-passed him from time to time. Starnes had been outraged by the 1971 book Le crise d'octobre by the journalist Gérard Pelletier that claimed that the RCMP was unprepared for the October crisis and sent Goyer a lengthy memo arguing that the RCMP had been active in monitoring the FLQ in 1970. Starnes in particular noted that the RCMP foiled two FLQ kidnapping schemes in the spring of 1970, one to kidnap the U.S. consul in Montreal to protest the Vietnam war and another scheme to kidnap the Israeli consul in Montreal to express solidarity with the Palestinians. Starnes politely, but firmly pointed out to Goyer that the RCMP had warned it was likely that the FLQ would try again to kidnap foreign diplomats and argued the kidnapping of James Cross, the British Trade Commissioner in Montreal, had been caused by the failure of the government to act on its advice given in May 1970 to provide bodyguards to all diplomats in Montreal. Cross had been kidnapped at gunpoint by the FLQ when he went to answer his door when it was being rung by his kidnappers, and his kidnaping would have almost certainly been avoided had he had some bodyguards protecting him. Starnes's memo seemed to have influenced Goyer to believe that the RCMP knew what was best.

=== Fears over the 1976 Summer Olympics ===
Logo of the 1976 Summer Olympics

Further increasing the fears of the Trudeau government was that in 1970 Montreal had won the right to host the 1976 Summer Olympics, which led to the fear that the FLQ would stage a terrorist attack during the Olympics. Trudeau and his cabinet were convinced with the eyes of the world focused on Montreal that the FLQ would stage a major terrorist incident at the scheduled time of the Olympics with the aim of disgracing Canada on the world stage, which increased the atmosphere of fear and paranoia. Lalonde recalled in 2011: "He [Goyer] had his own views. He might have been kind of stubborn. He often pursued what he thought was right without taking into consideration other points of view. He was young. Because he was young he was not a heavyweight in cabinet, but subject to close supervision by senior ministers...He was ambitious, but he never quite achieved his ambition...Certainly, the cabinet as a whole prodded the RCMP to concentrate on the FLQ, which was using violence in support of separatism". Lalonde stated that the RCMP had traditionally focused on spying upon the Canadian Communist Party, and the Trudeau cabinet was notably annoyed at what appeared to be a glaring lack of intelligence about the FLQ, leading to intense pressure being applied on Goyer to push the RCMP harder for more intelligence on the FLQ.

In this mood of paranoia and fear, Goyer saw himself as locked into mortal combat with the FLQ, which justified using the full resources of the state to crush this enemy. Goyer ordered the Royal Canadian Mounted Police to make a "blacklist" (also known as the "enemies' list") of all federal civil servants who held left-wing views which would presumably make them sympathetic towards the Marxist FLQ. The "enemies' list" of civil servants who were put under RMCP surveillance for years afterward is regarded as one of the darker moments of the Trudeau government. In January 1971, Goyer met with the RCMP commissioner William Leonard Higgitt where he expressed a special interest in bugging the homes and businesses of suspected FLQ supporters, saying that government needed as much intelligence about the FLQ as possible.

Goyer had a difficult working relationship with the Deputy Solicitor General Ernest Côté. Côté complained that Goyer had appointed his mistress as his chief of staff despite her manifest lack of qualifications and awarded her privileges such as a free pass with the Crown corporation Air Canada, allowing her to fly anywhere she wanted at the expense of the taxpayers. Côté accused Goyer of engaging in petty corruption as he described him as a minister who liked to play fast and loose with the rules for his own benefit.

=== Kingston Penitentiary crisis ===
On 18 January 1971, Warden Arthur Jarvis of Kingston Penitentiary wrote to Paul Faguay, the commissioner of penitentiaries that the Kingston penitentiary "appears to be almost at the point of explosion". Jarvis's letter was never answered. On 14 April 1971, the Kingston Penitentiary riot began. A group of inmates led by the prison barber Billy Knight took six prison guards hostage and threatened to kill them if their demands were not met. The next day Goyer attended an emergency meeting of the cabinet chaired by the acting prime minister Edgar Benson (Trudeau who had just married Margaret Sinclair was on his honeymoon in the West Indies). Goyer listed to the cabinet the six demands made by Knight, all of which he advised rejecting except for the citizens' committee to mediate an end to the crisis.

However, Goyer expressed about the citizens' committee, telling the cabinet that he wanted the journalist Ron Haggart removed from the committee because he was the crime correspondent of the Toronto Telegram. The Toronto Telegram was a Conservative newspaper opposed to the Liberal Trudeau government, and Goyer claimed that as a journalist Haggart would publish information unflattening towards the government. Haggart, as the crime correspondent of the Toronto Telegram, was well respected by the prisoners who had read his articles, and Knight believed that Haggart would be fair-minded in mediating a peaceful end to the crisis. Knight had insisted that the citizens' committee have at least six members and some of his other choices for the citizens' committee such as the actor Paul Newman and the boxer Muhammad Ali were clearly unrealistic. The cabinet overruled Goyer under the grounds that there was no replacement for Haggart on the citizens' committee whom Knight would accept.

Goyer favored a tough line towards the riot, advocating no concessions to Knight and favoring having the prison being stormed as soon as possible. Goyer's first suggestion of having prison guards armed with shotguns enter the prison with the Canadian Army in support was rejected by the cabinet, which instead decided to wait until 18 April to give time for negotiations for a peaceful resolution. Goyer admitted that there was a danger that the hostages might be killed if the prison was stormed, but that the risk had to be taken. Goyer's tough line during the riot was largely motivated by political considerations with regard to national unity. Six months before in October 1970 the Trudeau government had invoked the War Measures Act which suspended all civil liberties in Canada in response to the FLQ kidnapping James Cross, the British trade commissioner in Montreal and Pierre Laporte, the Quebec Labor Minister who was later murdered. The October Crisis and the Kingston Penitentiary however dissimilar had one similarity in common, namely a group of people had taken hostages in order to effect a political change, namely independence for Quebec in the case of FLQ and prison reform in the case of Knight and his followers. Goyer felt if the Trudeau government was not as equally draconian towards a prison riot in Ontario as it was towards terrorism in Quebec, then the Trudeau government would be labelled as anti-Quebec. However, through the cabinet rejected Goyer's advice to have the prison stormed as soon as possible, the solicitor general won his point in that the cabinet agreed that if the riot was not ended by noon on 18 April 1971 then the Kingston penitentiary would be stormed by the Canadian Army. In approving a military assault on Kingston penitentiary, the cabinet gave permission for lethal force to be used with the soldiers being ordered to shoot to kill in the event of resistance.

Later, on 15 April 1971, a task force of 130 soldiers from the Royal Canadian Regiment commanded by Major Ed Richmond arrived at Kingston Penitentiary marching up with fixed bayonets on their automatic rifles. The soldiers started to erect a barbed wire fence around the prison while taking up positions for a possible assault. On 16 April, Goyer met with Haggart along with another member of the citizens' committee, Arthur Martin. Goyer rejected the request of Knight for amnesty for the prisoners involved in the riot, insisting the inmates involved be prosecuted for kidnapping after the end of the riot for taking six prison guards taken hostage. At the time, the death penalty was still on Canadian statute books, through the last executions in Canada had taken place in 1962. Goyer refused to rule out seeking the death penalty for kidnapping of public officials, a stance that Martin and Haggart felt to be gratuitously provocative.

On the night of 17 April 1971, the citizens' committee reached an agreement with Knight for the release of the hostages and the end of the riot, which was accepted by the government at first. However, later that night, Goyer undermined the agreement by holding a press conference that was broadcast on national radio and television saying the Crown would make no deal with the rioters. Goyer bluntly announced he wanted the prisoners to surrender unconditionally or else see the prison stormed. Three members of the citizens' committee, namely Ron Haggart, William Donkin and Desmond Morton were shocked that Goyer had just torpedoed the deal that he had initially approved of a few hours before with his press conference. In his press conference, Goyer stated he would make no concessions to end the riot and there would be no agreements on anything, saying he was only willing to accept unconditional surrender. Goyer stated that the prisoners had no guns while the military task force was well armed, leading him to conclude that he had held all the cards, hence his insistence on unconditional surrender as he called the prisoners "cowards". Even worse from the viewpoint of the citizens committee was the fact that the inmates had listened to Goyer's speech via their transistor radios inside the prison. Haggart vomited in disgust, fearing that the hostages would now be killed.

Goyer's speech caused the complete collapse of Knight's authority and to the led to the prisoners dividing into two factions, a radical faction led by the outlaw biker Brian Beaucage who favored killing the hostages and a moderate faction led by the career criminal Barrie MacKenzie who favored surrender to prevent a bloodbath. The faction led by Beaucage attempted to kill the hostages, and unable to do so engaged in a torture-murder session of the so-called "undesirables" (prisoner slang for child molesters). The riot was finally ended when MacKenzie and Haggart were able in the early hours of 18 April to broker a deal under the hostages would be released to stop the torture-murder session as the inmates would surrender without the hostages. The deal that MacKenzie and Haggart reached was just within a few hours of the scheduled military assault at noon on 18 April.

Goyer arrived at Kingston penitentiary to oversee the end of the riot. When MacKenzie stated that he would release one hostage for every sixty prisoners who marched out, Goyer told him over the phone he was rejecting his offer and wanted all of the hostages released at once, a demand that MacKenzie rejected. MacKenzie's pro rata formula prevailed and MacKenzie was the last prisoner to surrender on the morning of 18 April 1971. As MacKenzie walked out of Kingston penitentiary, Goyer and Haggart were there to greet him. Goyer returned to Ottawa later that day to give a self-congratulatory speech before the House of Commons where he announced "no deal and no conditions" were the outcome of the riot. Goyer stated that the riot was simply an outbreak of mindless violence by the prisoners and stated that the government had generously spent 18 million dollars building a modern, state-of-the-art prison at Millhaven to replace Kingston Penitentiary. However, Goyer stated in the same speech that he would create a royal commission to discover the causes of the Kingston prison riot. Goyer lied to the house during his speech when he claimed that neither he nor anyone else in his ministry had received advance warnings about a possible riot at Kingston penitentiary when in fact Warden Jarvis had written a letter in January 1971 giving that precise warning.

Haggart wrote in the Toronto Telegram: "In truth, the plan for releasing hostages ‘from time to time’ originated as much with responsible inmates as with anyone. Without naming names, it would not have hurt the minister to say so." At a press conference in Toronto, Morton told the media that "Goyer blew it!", saying the Solicitor General had undermined the agreement that the citizens committee had reached and was in part responsible for the torture-murder session, which had would have been avoided had it not been for Goyer's press conference. Morton also stated that the prisoners wanted promises that they would not be beaten by the prison guards if they surrendered, which Goyer put off giving, which thereby extended the riot as that one was of the key demands of the inmates. Morton stated he knew from speaking to Knight and the other inmates' committee members that the prisoners were most insistent on receiving promises that they would not be beaten if they surrendered peacefully. Morton complained instead of giving that promise, Goyer had marched outside of Kingston Penitentiary with a megaphone shouting abuse at the prisoners inside and warning them the Canadian Army would kill them all if they did not surrender. Morton stated that Goyer was unfit to be Solicitor General, saying that his actions during the Kingston prison riot had served to inflame tensions instead of reducing them and that Goyer seemed intent on sabotaging efforts for a peaceful resolution.

==== Continuation at Millhaven Institution ====
Contrary to what the prisoners had been promised, after their surrender, the prisoners from Kingston Penitentiary were sent to Millhaven Institution where they were all beaten by the guards. Knight, as the man who started the Kingston prison riot, was singled out by the Millhaven guards and forced to walk a gauntlet of prison guards who struck him with nightsticks several times. Knight later sued Goyer in a civil court for the beatings and won his case with a judge ordering Goyer to pay Knight $3, 500 dollars. Several members of the citizens committee such as Martin wanted to visit Millhaven to investigate the reports that the prison guards were beating the prisoners to punish them for taking prison guards hostage, a demand that Goyer flatly refused.

On 28 April 1971, four NDP MPs, namely John Gilbert, Arnold Peters, John Skoberg and Frank Howard arrived at Millhaven with a request to speak to the prisoners after receiving reports of the beatings. Under the Penitentiaries Act of 1886, MPs were classified as "privileged visitors" free to inspect any federal prison without notice to ensure that the prisoners were being treated humanely in order to raise concerns in the House of Commons though only a few MPs had availed themselves of this privilege. Warden Don Clark called Goyer to ask him what to do, saying to allow the MPs to visit Millhaven would lead to uncomfortable questions for the solicitor general in the House of Commons about the mass beatings the Millhaven guards had inflicted on the Kingston prisoners. The four MPs were all expelled from Millhaven, which led to Howard giving a speech in the House of Commons protesting their treatment, which had violated Canadian law. In response, Goyer admitted to the House of Commons that he ordered the four MPs out of Millhaven, saying that the visit of the MPs could have caused another riot. Goyer told the House of Commons: "Millhaven is currently overcrowded. The psychological climate there is tenuous and we have to be careful. My first responsibility is to see there are no more riots and to see to the protection of the prisoners". In response, Howard shouted: "What have you got to hide? Evasiveness is no substitute for intelligence". Goyer answered Howard with the remark: "Mr. Speaker, I did not appeal to the intelligence of the honorable member, but to this courtesy and I see he lacks both".

As the Liberal benches erupted in laughter, Howard continued to press on with his line of questioning, saying he had received reliable information about the beatings at Millhaven and the minister should answer his questions. The mood of the House grew more excited leading for the Speaker of the House to call for order. The four MPs expressed concerns about Millhaven, saying that before they were expelled on Goyer's orders that they had discovered the Millhaven "recreation hall" was just a mud field, that the beds in Millhaven were filthy, and the cells were "claustrophobic".

On 13 May 1971, Peters during question time in the House of Commons told justice minister John Turner that he learned from reliable sources that a number of Millhaven prisoners were engaged in a hunger strike to protest the living conditions at Millhaven. Turner in response stated that he had asked Goyer to investigate the problem of hunger strikes at Millhaven and devise a solution. The NDP and Conservative members of the justice committee of the House of Commons began to press to visit Millhaven to investigate the reports of inhumane living conditions and that the guards were beating the prisoners, but Goyer was adamant that no MPs being allowed to enter Millhaven or talk to the inmates. Goyer told the justice committee that he was denying them the right to visit Millhaven because: "It wouldn't be good to cause any more excitement than necessary in the present climate. We open the doors and run the risk of another riot or we close the doors and run the risk of criticism". Peters argued that the best way of preventing a repeat of the Kingston prison riot at Millhaven would be to investigate the reports, but Goyer exploded in fury at him, saying: "If you don't know the truth, keep quiet!" The Conservative MP and justice critic Eldon Woolliams put forward a motion that the MPs of the justice committee visit Millhaven to inspect the condition of the prison, but the motion was defeated in a vote along party lines 5 to 3. During question time, the Liberal MP Harold Stafford noted that one of the men killed in the torture-murder session during the Kingston prison riot, the child abuser Bertrand Robert, had repeatedly asked to moved out of Kingston Penitentiary out of fear for his life. Goyer replied to Stafford that he could not comment on Robert's murder because it was now under police investigation, but stated that Robert had been held in the 1-D range at Kingston Penitentiary for child killers and child molesters for his own safety. Another MP, the Liberal Terrence Murphy then rose to tell Goyer that in 1970 he visited several prisons and had discovered that "undesirable" prisoners such as Robert were segregated from the other prisoners. Murphy told Goyer: "They live in conditions we would not expect a dog to live under. They spent twenty-three and a half hour a day in cramped cells and looked like hungry chickens begging for food". Goyer replied that he needed more time to study the problems of prison life. On 27 May 1971, the Ontario Provincial Police charged 11 Millhaven guards with 24 counts of assault causing grievous bodily harm in connection with the mass beatings on 18–19 April 1971. Goyer told the House of Commons that he would not fire the 11 guards charged unless they were convicted and announced that the Crown would pay for their defense counsel at their trial.

==== Aftermath ====
In response to a media firestorm about the conditions in Canadian prisons, which had become a topic of public interest since the Kingston riot, on 20 July 1971, Goyer announced that he was amending the Penitentiaries Act to give prisoners the right to elect committees to advise the prison authorities about living conditions in the prisons. He told the House of Commons: "We recognize committees of prisoners elected by the inmate population can provide vital communication between the inmates and the prison administration". Fogarty wrote that Goyer took a harsh and gratuitously aggressive approach during the Kingston penitentiary riot, but rather "surprisingly" became an advocate of prison reform afterwards, a choice in approach that she credited to the Kingston penitentiary riot as Goyer wanted to prevent more prison riots.

On 24 April 1972, the Royal Commission under Justice J.W. Swackhamer presented its report to Goyer on the causes of the Kingston Penitentiary riot. The report concluded that the root cause of the riot was the government's policy of keeping prisoners in their cells for 16 hours per day and the policy of ending recreations such as sports teams and sports events. The parts of the Swackhammer report which stated that 86 prisoners had been beaten at Millhaven on 18–19 April 1971 and that the attacks had ordered by Warden John D. "Don" Clark, deputy warden Patrick McKegeny and Deputy Warden Howard S. Bell were censored. Swackhammer had recommended that Clark, McKegeny and Bell be fired for ordering the mass beatings, but no one was ever fired for the beatings.

=== RCMP espionage ===
On 5 March 1971, Goyer received a memo John Kennett Starnes, the director of the RCMP Security Service, stating the RCMP had been monitoring the "Waffle faction" of the New Democratic Party as a "subversive and radical element" in Canadian life. In May 1971, Starnes received a request from Goyer's for an "enemies' list" of federal civil servants with left-wing views. In response, Goyer received that same month another memo from Starnes entitled "The Changing Nature of the Threat from the New Left-Extra Parliamentary Opposition and the Penetration of the Government". Starnes listed 21 civil servants whom he believed were abusing their positions to advance extreme left-wing causes. Most of the people on the "enemies' list" were so named because they had as university students in the 1960s been readers of Praxis (a dissident Marxist journal in Yugoslavia that was somewhat critical of Marshal Josip Broz Tito for not establishing the sort of society Karl Marx had envisioned) and/or had been readers of an anarchist newspaper On Your Generation published in Montreal. Goyer in turn sent out a memo to several other ministers on 15 June 1971 about the 21 civil servants whom Goyer accused of being "former campus revolutionaries" who were working for "the destruction of the existing political and social structure of Canada". In response, several of the civil servants named on Goyer's list were promptly fired. Higgitt in June 1971 received a memo from Robin Bourne of the Solicitor General's office saying that Goyer wanted monthly reports of the number and locations of RCMP electronic eavesdropping operations with regard to the FLQ and its supporters, but was not interested in "the operational side of these activities such as how various devices are installed". At the same time, Starnes sent out a memo to Higgitt stating that the electronic eavesdropping operations "are or may be outside the law" as the RCMP rarely asked for a warrant, but that Goyer was not to be informed. Later in June 1971, Starnes wrote a memo to Goyer asking for permission for the RCMP to review tax filings and requests for unemployment insurance, which he stated was necessary for his intelligence-gathering. Goyer lobbied both the Revenue minister Herb Gray and the Labour minister Bryce Mackasey for the Mounties to be allowed access to tax filings and unemployment insurance claims "in a manner which would attract no attention or criticism".

In September 1971, Goyer ended the restriction imposed in 1961 on the RCMP conducting intelligence operations on universities, though he added that the RCMP had to seek permission in writing from himself in the event of recruiting a paid informer or conducting a bugging operation on a university. The number of paid informers on universities was small as by 1972 the Mounties had a total of five paid informers working in or attending universities. Goyer however excluded unpaid informers on universities from needing his prior approval, thus meaning the RCMP could recruit any university professor or student as an informer without seeking Goyer's approval in writing provided the informer was not being paid.

In May 1972, the RCMP burned down a barn in St. Anne-de-la-Rochelle in Quebec's Eastern Townships because it was believed the barn was going to be used for a meeting between the FLQ and the Black Panther Party. The barn-burning was to be one of the more controversial acts committed by the RCMP, but was justified when it emerged under the grounds that the FLQ and the Black Panthers were working together to launch a cross-border guerrilla war against the United States and Canada. Goyer was later to deny that he known of the barn-burning. In October 1972, the Mounties broke into the Montreal office of a separatist publishing house, the Agence de Presse Libre du Québec (APLQ). Goyer met with Starnes and Higgitt after the APLQ break-in, but he was to later claim that the break-in was not discussed. Even at the time, there were allegations that the Mounties were behind the APLQ break-in as it was noted that the thieves had only taken the files in the APLP office. Goyer was to claim at the McDonald commission hearings that because the Quebec Justice Minister Jérôme Choquette had denied in a press conference that any police forces were involved in the APLQ break-in that for him it settled the matter and he did not ask Higgitt or Starnes about it. Contrary to Goyer's testimony, both Starnes and Higgitt were to testify at the McDonald Commission that they had in fact informed Goyer that the Mounties had staged the APLQ break-in, which had provided a treasure trove of information about Quebec separatists as both maintained that the minister was kept fully informed about the illegal means the RCMP obtained intelligence.

=== Penal reforms ===
In September 1971, Goyer introduced the penal reforms that he had been promising since the spring of 1971. Under his reforms, prisoners' in federal penitentiaries were permitted to grow their hair long; allowed greater chances to earn parole; were permitted for the first time in Canadian history conjugal visits with their wives and girlfriends; and allowed greater educational opportunities as most Canadian criminals were barely literate. Goyer told the House of Commons when introducing his bill: "For too long a time now, our punishment-oriented society has cultivated a state of mind that demands that offenders, whatever their age, and whatever the offence, be placed behind bars. Too many Canadians object to looking at offenders as members of our society, and seem to disregard the fact that the correctional process aims at making the offender a useful and law-abiding citizen, and not any more an individual alienated from society and in conflict with it. Consequently, we have decided from now on to stress the rehabilitation of individuals, rather than the protection of society. Our reforms will perhaps be criticized for being too liberal or for omitting to protect society against dangerous criminals. This new policy will probably involve some risk, but we cannot maintain a system which in itself can cause even more obvious dangers."

== The McDonald Commission and the Stopforth libel case ==
=== 1972 election ===
Following the 1972 election, he became Minister of Supply and Services. The Liberals won the 1972 election by only two seats, winning 109 seats to the 107 won by the Conservatives. As the prime minister of a minority government, Trudeau wanted strong Quebec representation in his cabinet to ensure its survival. In the 1972 election Quebecois voters had voted solidly for the Liberals, which proved to be the Trudeau government's salvation as the Liberals had failed to win the majority of the seats in the other 9 provinces.

=== The "oil shock" ===
In October 1973, a number of Arab nations led by King Faisal of Saudi Arabia imposed a total oil embargo on the United States to punish the Americans for support of Israel during the October War. The oil embargo did not cut the United States off from oil as there were other nations from which oil could be purchased, but it did cause a shortage of oil, which led to the oil prices quadrupling in the United States from October to December 1973. In turn, the so-called "oil shock" led to the price of oil quadrupling globally as oil producers wanted global prices equivalent to what could be reached in the United States, leading to massive bout of global inflation, which ended the "long summer" of prosperity that existed in the West since 1945. The end of the "long summer" of prosperity caused an immense psychological shock all over the West, and led to frantic search for "energy independence" from the turbulent Middle East.

The Athabasca oil sands in northern Alberta centered around the city of Fort McMurray had been discovered in the 19th century, but had ignored at first as extracting oil from the bituminous tar sands was an expensive process. The Albertan oil was uncompetitive with the cheap oil from Saudi Arabia, and the Athabasca oil sands were generally ignore by the oil industry,. In response to the "oil shock", President Richard Nixon asked Congress on 7 November 1973 to fund Project Independence designed to give the United States "energy independence" by 1980. Ignoring the fact that Project Independence called for the United States self-sufficient in energy, Goyer saw Project Independence as a great opportunity for Canada and declared in a speech on 23 December 1973: "Government and industry should cooperate immediately to develop the Alberta oil sands in time to sell to the U.S. while it is still oil hungry". The American futurist Herman Kahn of the Hudson Institute, best known for his 1960 book On Thermonuclear War where he advocated the building of a "doomsday machine" that could end all life on earth as the best way to prevent World War Three, expressed much interest in the oil sands of Alberta as the solution to the so-called "oil shock" caused by the embargo. Goyer had close ties to Kahn who had hired the economist Marie-Josee Drouin-who was Goyer's mistress at the time-to work as the president of the Hudson Institute's Canadian branch. Drouin had served as Goyer's mistress and "special executive assistant" before leaving Ottawa in 1973 to work for Kahn. The only other Canadian on the board of directors of the Hudson Institute's Montreal office was Claude Frenette, the vice president of the Power Corporation and a major campaign contributor to the federal Liberal Party. Goyer denied that he knew Kahn through Drouin, and instead claimed to have had a "chance meeting" with Kahn at the Dorval Airport in Montreal in the fall of 1973. During the "so-called chance meeting" as it was dubbed at the time, Kahn expounded to Goyer on the virtues of exploiting the Athabasca oil sands as the solution to the oil crisis. Kahn during a visit to Ottawa in November 1973 advocated to the cabinet what was widely viewed as a "fantastic" plan under which a consortium of American, European and Japanese companies would provide billions to develop the oil sands of Fort McMurray and build at least 20 oil plants and refineries by 1979. To keep costs under control, Kahn advocated importing 30, 000 South Korean workers into Fort McMurray to provide the necessary labour while the government of Canada would pay compensation to Canadian unions for not employing Canadian workers.

Goyer was much taken with Kahn's plans, and spent much of 1974 travelling across the country, arguing in favor of Kahn's scheme as the best solution to the "oil shock". It was widely believed that the fact that Kahn had hired Drouin to serve as the executive director of the Hudson Institute's Canadian branch was the reason for his strident support of the Kahn plan. The Canadian scholar Larry Pratt wrote about the Kahn plan: "The fantastic environmental chaos would be accepted and the Athabasca River System-part of the Mackenzie System-would be written off...This half-baked brainstorm of a very over-rated think tank is currently being hawked around the country by our Minister of Supply, Jean-Pierre Goyer." Goyer admitted that the Kahn plan would cost billions, but argued that the high global oil prices caused by the "oil shock" made the Kahn price feasible. He stated through the Kahn plan would cost at least $20 billion to develop the oil sands of Fort McMurray and build the necessary pipelines to transport the oil, but the present economic emergency made the plan quite reasonable as the Americans were desperate not to be so dependent upon oil from the Middle East. Goyer was the leading advocate of acceptance of the Kahn plan as the capital for the development of the tar sands would all from the consortium who would have exclusive control of the oil fields in the Athabasca region until 1980. The Canadian scholars Paul Bresee and Stephen Tyler wrote: "Goyer's enthusiasm for this project is somewhat bewildering. It involves complete and permanent decimation of a large part of northern Alberta, economic and social dislocations of truly staggering proportions, and potentially enormous operating costs for Canada. Yet Goyer's chief claim is that it will cost the country nothing. There is a certain contradiction in terms of this argument".

=== Aircraft buying scandal ===
In 1975–1976, Goyer was involved in the fiasco of buying long range patrol aircraft for patrolling the skies above the near north and far north. The procurement process was marked by a convoluted and confusing purchasing process under which the Department of National Defense set the requirements for the aircraft to be purchased while the Department of Industry was responsible for negotiating with the suppliers for the "industrial offsets" (the parts of the aircraft to be manufactured in Canada) while the Department of Supply was charged with actually buying the aircraft.

A recurring theme of Trudeau's time in office was his wish to "rationalize" the governing process by changing the bureaucratic structure in a manner intended to make for greater efficiency. With regard to defense procurement, Trudeau had imposed the requirement that any arms or weapons purchased should cost as little as possible while creating the maximum "offsets" to the Canadian economy by ensuring investments in Canadian manufacturing from whatever supplier had won the arms contract. The majority of the arms and weapons systems purchased by Canada came from abroad, and the policy of seeking "offsets" was imposed in order to ensure that the purchase of arms created at least some economic benefit to Canada. Typically, an "offset" was sought with regard to aircraft by having at least parts of any aircraft purchased manufactured in Canada and/or having Canadian firms serve as sub-contractors in the manufacturing process. The decision to have three departments involved in buying the long range patrol aircraft was intended by Trudeau to "rationalize" the procurement process by assigning to each department the area in which it specialized in, but as was often the case with Trudeau's "rationalization" schemes the results were the opposite from those intended. With three ministries in charge of the procurement process, the costs escalated out of control and the project was cancelled in May 1976. The political scientist Michael Tucker wrote that the long range patrol aircraft procurement was marred by "bureaucratic mismanagement ensuring from ill-defined responsibilities, poor communication, and misinformation".

During his time as Minister of Supply, Goyer was involved in a lengthy libel suit launched against him by a civil servant about remarks that Goyer had made over the cost of buying new long range patrol aircraft. On 1 June 1976, Goyer had told the House of Commons about the $1 billion cost overrun on buying long range patrol aircraft: "I stand by my officials and I accept responsibility for errors in judgement, mistakes made in good faith, and inadvertent errors. But I do not believe ministerial responsibility extends to cases of misinformation or gross negligence". When asked to repeat those remarks outside of the House of Commons where the legal immunity of MPs to libel does not apply, Goyer did so and named the civil servant he had assigned as the Department of Supply's representative to the long range aircraft procurement, Lawrence Stopforth, by name as the official responsible for the "gross negligence". During the same press conference, Goyer had accused Stopforth of "gross negligence" and of "misinforming" him of the costs of buying long range aircraft, causing Stopforth to sue for libel.

=== RCMP blacklist ===
In March 1976, Robert Samson, a former Mountie on trial for a bombing testified that he committed far worse crimes during his time as a RCMP officer, which drew public attention onto the illegal activities of the RCMP and Goyer who been the minister in charge of the RCMP during the time that the Mounties were breaking the law. In October 1976, the allegation was made of a RCMP "blacklist" of federal civil servants who were to be watched because their views were aimed at "the destruction of the existing political and social structure of Canada". Goyer denied in the House of Commons that he ordered the RCMP to compile a "blacklist" or that the "blacklist" even existed, but it was confirmed on 16 October 1976 that he had indeed ordered the RCMP to make the "blacklist" in 1971. Trudeau had at first denied there was a "blacklist" and when the existence of the "blacklist" was confirmed, he reverted to his usual line that his government had no control over the RCMP despite the fact it was Goyer who had ordered the "blacklist".

=== La Francophonie ===
In the 1960s-1970s, a major issue in relations between the federal government and the Quebec government was the attempts of the latter to try conduct its foreign policy, which led to Ottawa sharply reminding Quebec City that the British North America Act had assigned the federal government the exclusive right to conduct foreign policy. At the meetings of la Francophonie, the federal government represented Canada as the senior delegation while Quebec and New Brunswick were allowed to send junior delegations. The federal government had very reluctantly allowed the provinces to send delegations to the meetings of la Francophonie for discussion of cultural matters, but had insisted the provincial delegations were under the authority of the federal delegation and that in no way could the provinces be allowed to conduct their own foreign policy. In 1976, the Parti Québécois (PQ) under René Lévesque won the Quebec general election with a platform calling for a referendum on secession from Canada. The new PQ government sought to have its own delegation independent of the Canadian delegation while attending the meetings of la Francophonie. Trudeau appointed Goyer as the special adviser to the external affairs minister on relations with French-speaking nations. Goyer's main task as special adviser was to lobby the government of France along with the governments of French-speaking African countries against the attempts of Quebec to have its own delegation at la Francophonie. Much to the dismay of Ottawa, France supported Quebec's demands. Goyer spent much time in the late 1970s visiting all of the French-speaking African nations, lobbying their leaders to reject Quebec's demands. He was greatly helped by the fact that the federal government could offer foreign aid while Quebec could not, and by promising generous foreign aid, Goyer was in effect able to bribe the African leaders to support the Canadian position that the only government represented French-Canadians abroad was the federal government. The request for Quebec to have its own delegation at the meetings of la Francophonie was rejected because the majority of the francophone African states voted in favor of the Canadian position.

=== 1978 Stopforth libel case ===
In 1978 the Stopforth libel case came to trial. On 1 April 1978, Justice Lieff awarded Stopforth $10, 000 dollars in the libel case. Lieff ruled that because of the legal immunity enjoyed by MPs when speaking in the House of Commons that Stopforth could not sue Goyer for his remarks inside the House of Commons, but only for his remarks outside the House of Commons. About Goyer's statements to the media, Lieff ruled in favor of Stopforth, stating it is an ancient principle in the British parliamentary system that ministers are the ones responsible for what happens in their portfolios, and it was unacceptable for Goyer to blame Stopforth for what was ultimately his responsibility for the $1 billion cost overrun in buying long range patrol aircraft. Thus it was on the technical grounds that in the Westminster system that is ministers rather than civil servants who are the ones ultimately responsible for what occurs in their portfolios that Lieff ruled in favor of Stopforth rather than on the merits of the case. Goyer lost the libel case in 1978, but won on an appeal in 1979. Again, the case was decided on technical grounds with the appeals judge ruling that Goyer's remarks to the media were an extension of parliamentary privilege of immunity from libel for remarks made inside the House of Commons.

=== McDonald Commission ===
Between 1977 and 1981, the McDonald Commission reviewed the practices of the Royal Canadian Mounted Police against the militant wing of the separatist movement and this led to the creation of a separate civilian security agency, the Canadian Security Intelligence Service in 1984. The intelligence responsibilities were removed from the federal police force. The McDonald Commission discovered that in 1972 that Goyer along with the Justice Minister Otto Lang were informed by Higgitt and Starnes that the RCMP were staging break-ins to plant bugs on Quebec separatists. The records of the meeting state that Lang and Goyer were informed by Higgitt and Stranes that the RCMP was engaged in "perhaps illegal" ways of planting bugs. Goyer testified at the McDonald Commission that the RCMP was dominated by White Anglo-Saxon Protestants (WASP) as he stated during his time as Solicitor General that he was often told that "the RCMP is a WASP organization and proud of it". He testified that the RCMP had a culture of institutionalized chauvinism as the Mounties were overwhelmingly WASPs, and his efforts to recruit more women and people of non-Anglo backgrounds were unsuccessful. Goyer testified that he had as Solicitor General had only a limited control over the RCMP as proven by the failure of his diversity campaign.

About the illegal break-in by the RCMP into a separatist publishing house in Montreal, the Agence de Presse Libre du Québec (APLQ), in October 1972, Goyer testified that he never asked about it during his time as Solicitor General because he could not believe the RCMP would break the law. When Higgitt was asked at the McDonald commission hearings about the 1971 memo from Starnes saying the RCMP bugging operations "are or may be outside the law", Higgitt testified that "for some reason or another" he never mentioned the memo to Goyer. Higgitt stated that as the RCMP commissioner "you don't go out of the way to put the minister at risk". In 1978, Goyer's first marriage ended in divorce with his wife filing to end the marriage under the grounds that his long-time chief of staff was also his mistress whom he had given a free pass with Air Canada. The scandal further damaged Goyer's reputation, and led to demands for his resignation.

Goyer left Cabinet in November 1978 and announced that he would not run in the 1979 election. He returned to the practice of law in Montreal. His decision to retire is believed to be related to the controversy caused by the illegal activities of the RCMP during his time as Solicitor General. The McDonald Commission hearings created a cloud over Goyer's reputation that has never gone away. About the allegation that Goyer ordered the APLQ break-in, Lalonde stated that Goyer's intense pressure on the RCMP to collect more intelligence on the FLQ may have been misunderstood by overzealous Mounties with Lalonde saying: "The Mounties were under stress to obtain and collect information, but they had no agents in the field, nothing to go on. I am not convinced Goyer ever directed RCMP Commissioner John Starnes to do anything illegal. No minister would have directly done that." By contrast, the journalist Jeff Sallot expressed skepticism about Goyer's claims of ignorance made at the McDonald Commission, noting that he was shown a memo in 1972 saying that the RCMP was engaged in "perhaps illegal" activities. Sallot also noted that Higgitt had in the same memo wanted the solicitor general to have the power to approve bugging operations under the grounds that judges when faced with a request for a warrant asked too many questions about the "perhaps illegal" sources of RCMP intelligence, which should have been a warning sign to Goyer. Fogarty described Goyer as a something of a failure as a politician, a "protégé" of Trudeau of whom great accomplishments were expected, but who instead was almost continuously embroiled in controversy with "constant demands" being made for his resignation due to his actions as a minister.

== Patron of the arts ==
After his retirement in 1979, Goyer worked as a lawyer in Montreal and served as a director on the board of Bombardier Inc. He married his second wife, Nicole Forbes, in Montreal. Goyer used his great wealth to serve as a patron of the arts, especially of classical music. He served as the head of the Montreal Arts Council. Reflecting his interest in music, Goyer served as the president of the Orchestre Métropolitain starting in 1998.

In 2000, as the president of the Orchestre Métropolitain, Goyer fired the chief conductor, Joseph Rescigno, to make way for his choice of chief conductor, Yannick Nézet-Séguin. Ever since 1998, Goyer had been in conflict with Rescigno over the artistic direction that the Orchestre Métropolitain was to go. Rescigno sued for wrongful dismissal and won $290, 00 dollars with a judge ruling that Goyer had fired Resicgno in "a brutal, abrasive and malicious manner." Justice Sylviane Borenstein also ruled that the remarks made by Goyer about Rescigno as a conductor at a press conference on 9 March 2000 were "false," "insulting," "gratuitous," and "malicious."^{,} The Orchestre Métropolitain briefly sought bankruptcy protection, but did pay Rescigno the damages he had been awarded in May 2006. On 23 May 2006, Goyer was forced to resign in disgrace from the Orchestre Métropolitain.

There is a Jean-Pierre Goyer fonds at Library and Archives Canada. Jean-Pierre Goyer is also honoured with Mécénat Musica Prix Goyer for collaborative emerging artist.

== Books and articles ==
- Bresee, Paul; Tyler, Stephen (Winter 1975). "Alberta's Athabasca Oil Sands: A Canadian Perspective". Alternatives: Perspectives on Society, Technology and Environment. 4 (2): 21–33.
- Chenier-Cullen, Nicole (2009). I Found My Thrill on Parliament Hill Not Just Another Political Memoir. Welcome to the Life of Bud Cullen, Trudeau Era Cabinet Minister, Member of Parliament. Toronto: iUniverse. ISBN 9781440179402.
- English, John (2007). Citizen of the World The Life of Pierre Elliott Trudeau Volume One: 1919-1968. Toronto: Knopf Canada. ISBN 9780676975222.
- English, John (2010). Just Watch Me The Life of Pierre Elliott Trudeau, Volume Two: 1968-2000. Knopf Canada. ISBN 9780676975246.
- Fogarty, Catherine (2021). Murder on the Inside The True Story of the Deadly Riot at Kingston Penitentiary. Windsor: Biblioasis. ISBN 9781771964029.
- Freeman, Linda (Autumn 1980). "Canada and Africa in the 1970s". International Journal. 35 (4): 794–820.
- Gwyn, Richard (1986). The Northern Magus Pierre Trudeau and Canadians. Toronto: PaperJacks. ISBN 9780770102012.
- Hewitt, Steve (2002). Spying 101 The RCMP's Secret Activities at Canadian Universities, 1917-1997. Toronto: University of Toronto Press. ISBN 9781487551339.
- Kernaghan, Kenneth (Summer 1979). "Power, Parliament and Public Servants in Canada: Ministerial Responsibility Reexamined". Canadian Public Policy. 5 (3): 383–396. doi:10.2307/3550225. JSTOR 3550225.
- McDougall, Ian (Winter 1975). "Canada's Oil and Gas: An 'Eleventh Hour' Option That Must Not Be Ignored". Canadian Public Policy / Analyse de Politiques. 1 (1): 47–57.
- Newman, Peter C. (1968). The Distemper of our Times. Montreal: McGill-Queen's University Press.
- Nossal, Kim Richard (Winter 2013). "Late learners: Canada, the F-35, and lessons from the New Fighter Aircraft program". International Journal. 1 (61): 1767–184.
- Nossal, Kim Richard (2016). Charlie Foxtrot Fixing Defence Procurement in Canada. Toronto: Dundurn. ISBN 9781459736764.
- Pratt, Larry (Summer 1974). "Syncrude or Socialism?". Alternatives: Perspectives on Society, Technology and Environment. 3 (4): 12–16.
- Pratt, Larry; Davis, Robert; Zannis, Mark; Block, Irvin (1974). Robert Chodos, Rae Murphy (ed.). Let Us Prey The Practices and Profits of Canadian Corporations and Businessmen. Toronto: James Lormier. pp. 108–120.
- Sallot, Jeff (1979). Nobody Said No The Real Story About How the Mounties Always Get Their Man. Toronto: James Lorimer Limited, Publishers. ISBN 9780888622860.
- Whitaker, Reginald; Kealey, Gregory S; Parnaby, Andrew (2012). Secret Service Political Policing in Canada From the Fenians to Fortress America. Toronto: University of Toronto Press. ISBN 9780802007520.
- Wright, Robert (2016). Trudeaumania The Rise to Power of Pierre Elliott Trudeau. Toronto: HarperCollins. ISBN 978-1-44344-500-9.

Political offices
Preceded by George James McIlraith	Solicitor General of Canada; 1970–1972	Succeeded by William Warren Allmand
Preceded by James Armstrong Richardson	Minister of Supply and Services; 1972–1978	Succeeded by Pierre de Bané
