= Jean Noël Desmarais =

Canadian politician

The Honourable Jean Noël Desmarais

Canadian Senator from Ontario
- In office June 4, 1993 – July 25, 1995
- Appointed by: Brian Mulroney

Personal details
- Born: April 11, 1924 Sudbury, Ontario, Canada
- Died: July 25, 1995 (aged 71) Sudbury, Ontario, Canada
- Party: Progressive Conservative
- Spouse: Collette Michaud (1924-2016)
- Children: 7
- Occupation: Physician

Jean Noël Desmarais (April 11, 1924 – July 25, 1995) was a Canadian physician, radiologist, and politician.

== Background ==
Born in Sudbury, Ontario, the brother of Louis Desmarais and Paul Desmarais, he was not involved in politics before being appointed to the Senate of Canada, when he represented the senatorial division of Sudbury, Ontario in 1993.

The Jean-Noël Desmarais Pavilion, designed by the architect Moshe Safdie, in the Montreal Museum of Fine Arts is named in his father's honour.

A cigarette smoker, he died of cancer in 1995.
