= William Leonard Higgitt =

Canadian civil servant

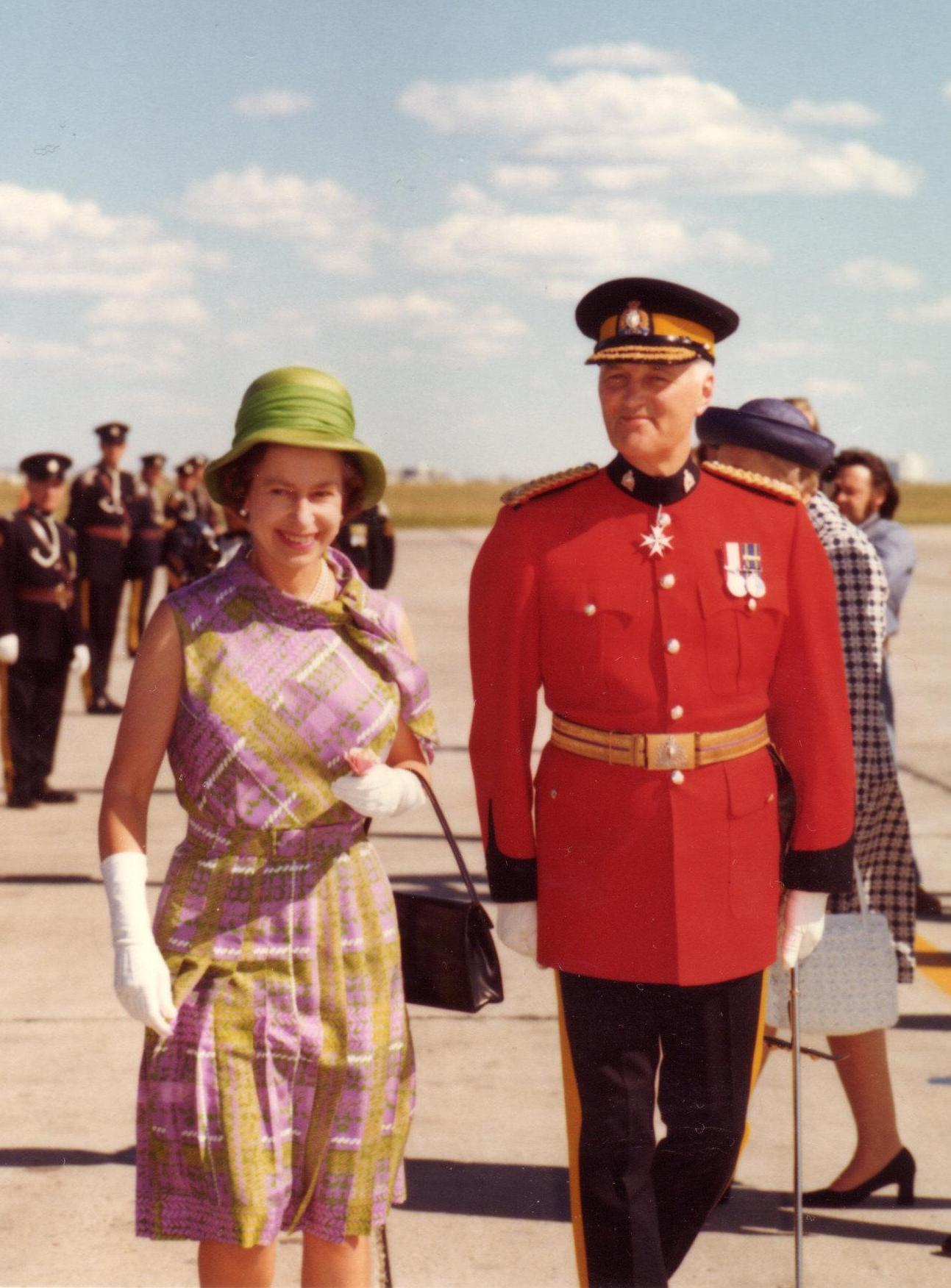
- Commissioner Higgitt and Queen Elizabeth II at the RCMP Centennial Celebrations, Regina, 1973

President of INTERPOL
- In office 1972–1976
- Preceded by: Paul Dickopf
- Succeeded by: Carl Persson

Commissioner of the Royal Canadian Mounted Police
- In office October 1, 1969 – December 28, 1973
- Preceded by: Malcolm Lindsay
- Succeeded by: Maurice Nadon

Personal details
- Born: November 10, 1917 Anerley, Saskatchewan, Canada
- Died: April 2, 1989 (aged 71) Ottawa, Ontario, Canada
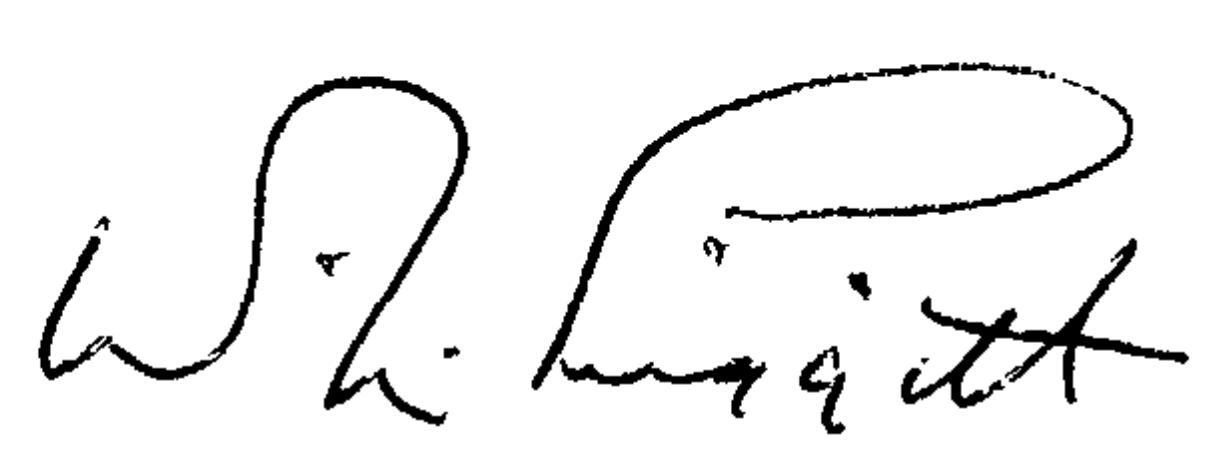
- Signature

William Leonard Higgitt (10 November 1917 – 2 April 1989) was the 14th commissioner of the Royal Canadian Mounted Police (RCMP), holding office from 1969 to 1973, and President of the International Criminal Police Organization (Interpol) from 1972 to 1976. Leonard Higgitt's background in intelligence and counterintelligence during and after World War II made him the preferred choice as RCMP Commissioner at what was the height of the Cold War. Higgitt's tenure as Canada's top spy, first, and then as RCMP Commissioner, also coincided with the civil rights movement in the United States, which was part of a period of broader political unrest and social change in Canada, including the Quebec nationalist movement and first-ever diplomatic negotiations in Stockholm between Canada and Communist China. Higgitt's time as Commissioner was marked by his efforts to balance a traditional view of the Mounties in the eye of the public, and a trust in the RCMP attending that view, with more modern, high-tech, and legally complex policing methods, including surveillance and data-gathering practices that found the RCMP facing increasing media and judicial scrutiny.

Higgitt directed national security operations during the October Crisis of 1970, when members of the Front de libération du Québec (FLQ) engaged in a series of urban bombings and also kidnapped the provincial Labour Minister Pierre Laporte and British diplomat James Cross. These events represented what was perhaps the most serious threat to national security in the history of Canada, and they also saw then Canadian Prime Minister Pierre Trudeau, to the objection of Higgitt, invoke the War Measures Act, the first time in Canadian history that the Act was invoked during peacetime.

Higgitt has been the only RCMP commissioner to ever rise to this position after starting from the lowest possible rank—sub-constable, a rank lower than third-class constable and later discontinued by the Force. As Commissioner, Higgitt also presided over the RCMP centenary.

== Early life ==
Higgitt was born in the village of Anerley, Saskatchewan, in 1917, to Percy Higgitt and May Higgitt (née Hall), and grew up in Anerley during the Depression years of the 1930s. Being born the same day that his uncle, Lennie Higgitt, died in World War I, he was given the name William Leonard, and was subsequently known as "Len" Higgitt by acquaintances throughout his life. Percy Higgitt's family traces their roots to Sheffield, Yorkshire, and May Hall to Boston, Lincolnshire. Percy immigrated to Saskatchewan in 1908, meeting May Hall there and starting a farm. Percy gave up his struggling farm when Leonard was four to be an Imperial Oil agent and grain buyer for the Canadian Consolidated Grain Company; later taking over the lone general store and post office in Anerley, which he operated for over forty years. Percy also provided municipal public service in various capacities. After primary schooling, Leonard Higgitt went to high school at Saskatoon Technical Collegiate. As a student in 1935, Higgitt featured in his high school's production of the comedy "So This Is London". In his student years, Higgitt also played hockey, baseball and soccer.

Wrote the Saskatoon Star-Phoenix in 1972, from very early on in his life Higgitt believed in the RCMP as a force for good: "Rural Saskatchewan offered little in the 1930s for a young man ready to set out on his own and, in the drought and dust and poverty, the RCMP stood out as a high and noble profession". Interviewed in 1972 by the Winnipeg Free Press, Higgitt said that as a youth he was struck by the dedication RCMP officers seemed to display in coping with the problems and hardships brought on by the Depression: "It wasn't just a matter of enforcing the law. It was a question of helping anyone who was in need. And no one who didn't live through that era can really appreciate what the needs were." After graduating from high school in 1937, at the age of nineteen, and two years before World War II began, Higgitt joined the RCMP at Regina, Saskatchewan, as a sub-constable; a rank later discontinued by the force. In Regina he completed recruit training, winning a medal for marksmanship, and became a stenographer at "F" Division headquarters. In 1937, Higgitt's was the first voice of a Mountie to be heard on the open airwaves, as police cars at the time were not yet equipped with two-way radios and it was necessary for Mounties to use commercial radio stations to send bulletins, including descriptions of wanted men, to detachment personnel twice daily.

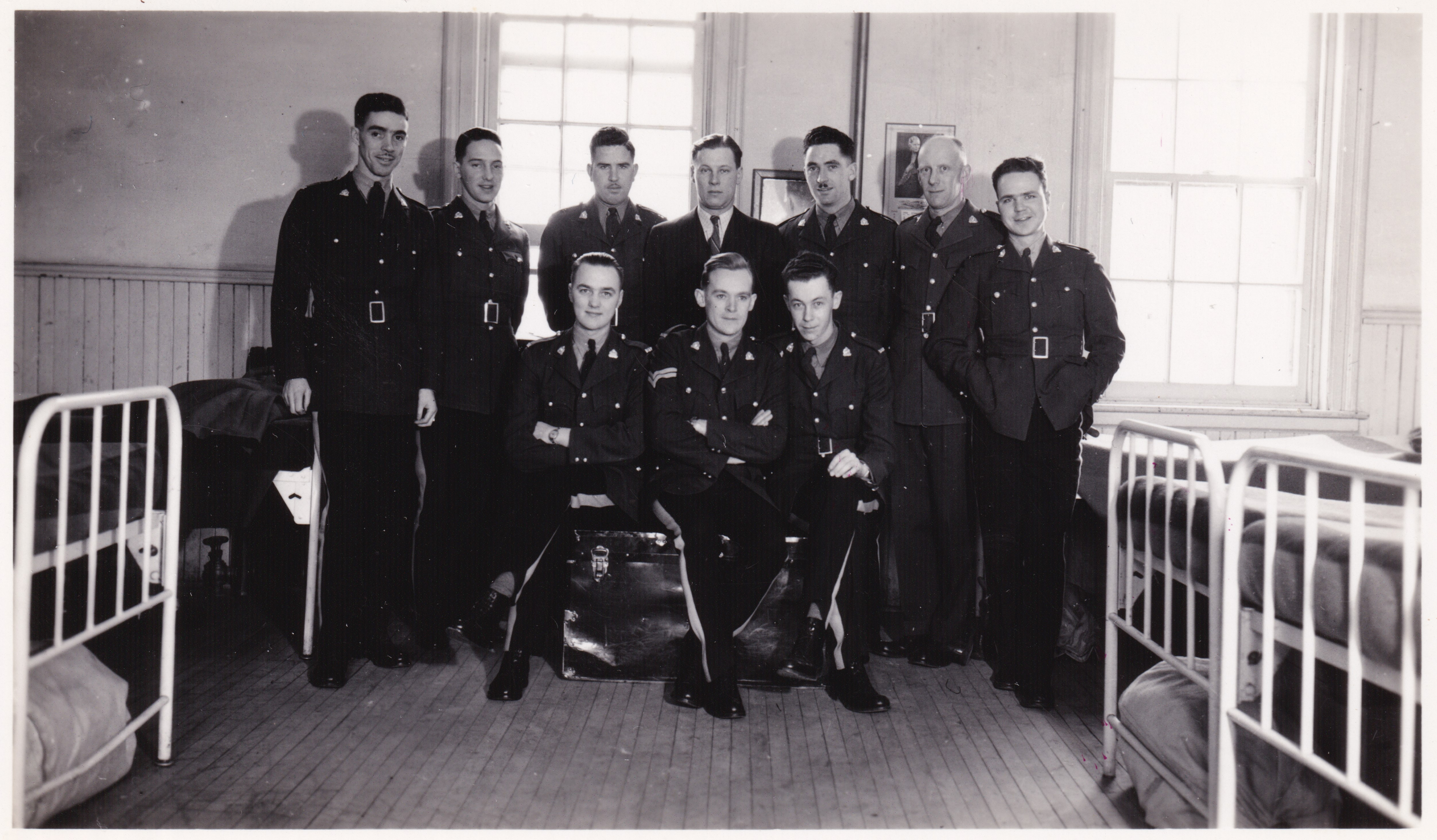
Two future Commissioners: Higgitt (lower left) and Malcom Lindsay (lower center)

Promoted to Constable, in Regina Higgitt supervised general criminal files and engaged in active police investigations, including conducting examinations of witnesses. With the outbreak of the War, and at the age of twenty-two, he was transferred to Ottawa and put immediately into intelligence and counter-intelligence. While assigned field investigations over the War years, Higgitt married a nurse, Evelyn Maude Pyke, of Lunenburg, Nova Scotia, in 1944. He also played on the RCMP basketball team in the Ottawa YMCA Basketball league, and on the RCMP soccer team in the Ottawa and District Football Association league. He also represented the RCMP in marksmanship tournaments.

== Career ==
=== World War II ===
Britain and France declared war on Germany in September 1939, and Canada followed. Higgitt was posted to Ottawa, Ontario, for special war duties and "disappeared into" the Intelligence Branch. By the late 1930s, various fascist groups across Canada had combined into the National Unity Party under the leadership of Adrien Arcand. Other such groups, and individuals sympathetic Nazism, remained underground. The Soviets were also using Canada as a staging point for spying on the United States (a Soviet military intelligence illegal carrying a Canadian passport in the name of Ignacy Witczak, obtained in part through the assistance of Sam Carr, an important member of the Communist Party of Canada, had arrived in the US in 1938). As the War escalated, Higgitt was appointed Government advisor to the Commons Judicial Committee on Internment Operations, a committee set up to identify and mitigate potential security risks to Canada and the Allied effort against Nazi Germany and Imperial Japan.

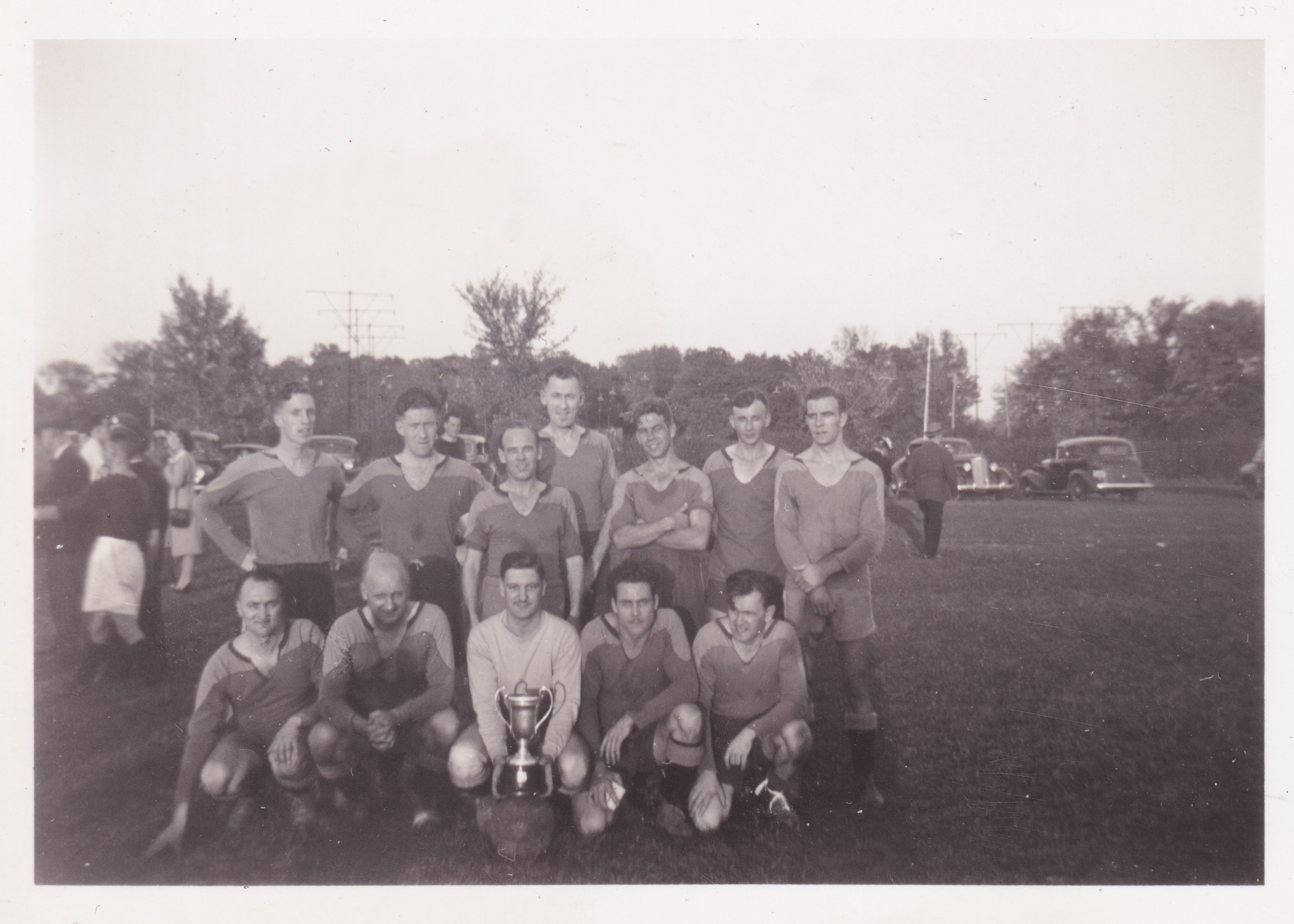
Higgitt (lower left), on RCMP Football team, circa 1940

Prior to the Allies' pivotal Normandy Landings, the internment operations led to the removal of several hundreds of German- and Italian-born Canadians, Arcand included, to detention camps in Canada's hinterlands until the surrender of the Axis powers. On the first day of World War II, RCMP agents broke the German-financed Canadian fascist group Deutsche Arbeits Front, interning four hundred Nazis. When Soviet Russia entered the war, more than one hundred Communists were interned at Hull, Quebec. Higgitt and his RCMP superiors advised the Canadian Federal Government that Japanese Canadians, for their part, posed relatively little threat as a supposed 'fifth column' of spies and saboteurs. Subsequently, the Government, not believing the RCMP, took the responsibility for evacuating coastal Japanese Canadians to interior British Columbia out of the Mounties' hands and gave it to the BC Security Commission, and in turn, by 1943, to the Department of Labour.

Political scientist Reg Whitaker and historian Gregory Kealey have argued that the relative effectiveness of the RCMP's Intelligence Branch in carrying out the responsibility of penetrating and monitoring pro-fascist groups, along with the nullification of the espionage, sabotage, or subversion threats believed to have been posed by these groups, ensured that the RCMP would carry out of the War an enhanced prestige within the Canadian state and some surety of a continued pre-eminent role in security intelligence in the postwar era. Higgitt remained a key figure in the RCMP's Cold War-era security intelligence operations. By the end of World War II, it had become clear that though the Nazi presence in Canada was largely subdued, a Soviet spy ring was operating from the rear wing of the Russian Embassy in Ottawa. A Red Army officer at the embassy, Igor Gouzenko, a cipher clerk trained in intelligence work, defected to the RCMP. Gouzenko's briefcase, containing Russian-language cablegrams and copied secret Canadian Government papers, secretly given over to Higgitt and the Intelligence Branch, showed that the Russians had details of matters that only Britain and Canada should have known. Gouzenko's defection was one of the principle catalysts for the rise of the Cold War; obliging Western governments, including Canada, to maintain and even intensify their undercover work.

But over the course of his career Higgitt, considering himself a police officer first, also showed consistent unease with paramilitary counterespionage operations that brushed against ethical and legal questions. In the early years of his career it seems Higgitt knew what he was facing, and was even denied a request to get transferred out of the Intelligence Branch and return to regular policing. By 1950, Higgitt had been promoted to officer in charge of the Counter-Espionage Section of the RCMP Security Service, and he wrote to his superiors about what it meant to "fight fire with fire."

To be successful in counterespionage work it is often necessary to adopt very unorthodox methods which do not fit in with our regular mode of operations. In this regard it is a matter of real and constant concern to the members of the Counter-Espionage Section of Headquarters Special Branch, that they have to request, or at least feel they should request, rather unusual courses of action by our field personnel well knowing that by complying with the request the investigator may be seriously jeopardizing their own futures in the Force if through bad luck or human error their operations are discovered by those persons against whom they are directing the investigation. Such discovery could lead to most embarrassing incidents and possibly legal action against the members concerned. It is to be hoped that some official notice can be taken of this situation and some overall directive laid down for guidance. Again it is to be stressed that extraordinary measures and methods must be used if we are to effectively cope with extraordinary situations. To some extent the axiom of 'the end justifies the means' is very true in Counter-Espionage operations but the personal risk to the operating members must be recognized before they can be expected to extend themselves in connection to these matters.

As Whitaker has written, associated with this, as Higgitt realized, was another disturbing aspect of security intelligence work, especially counterespionage: the work could literally lie at the margins of life and death. "Running secret sources and double agents was a very risky business, especially for the sources and agents, but that anxiety could extend to their handlers as well, who had to contend with troubling responsibilities, not to speak of moral dilemmas."

=== Gouzenko and the Early Post-War Years ===
Since the early nineteen-twenties, the RCMP's fledgling Special Branch, responsible for counter-intelligence, had been closely watching paid agents in Western Canada sent by Moscow to form a revolutionary party. The approach of World War II and the urgent need for close observation of the Nazi, Fascist, and Canadian Fascist parties gave impetus to the growth of the Special Branch. Captured enemy agents informed the RCMP that the speedy arrests in the early years of the War had completely wrecked the carefully built German espionage apparatus in Canada, information which was confirmed by the German High Command after the end of the War.

In 1945, Higgitt, along with John Leopold of the RCMP's Intelligence Branch, who had infiltrated the Communist Party of Canada in the 1920s, and two other future RCMP Commissioners, Charles Rivett-Carnac and Clifford Harvison, was a principal investigator of Igor Gouzenko, a cipher clerk for the Soviet Embassy to Canada who defected on September 5, three days after the official close of the War, with 109 documents on Soviet espionage activities in Canada, the United States, and the United Kingdom. Gouzenko had been stationed in Ottawa during the top secret Manhattan Project, which the Soviet Union had been left out of despite the Soviet's status as part of the Allied military coalition against Nazi Germany.

Armed with the documents [Gouzenko] had taken from the Military Attaché, the Royal Canadian Mounted Police took the case directly before Prime Minister Mackenzie King, who called in high government advisors. Mr. King then proceeded to Washington and presented the full details to President Truman. Prime Minister Attlee Britain was informed. It was decided to keep everything hushed until a complete or near-complete roundup of spies could be assured.

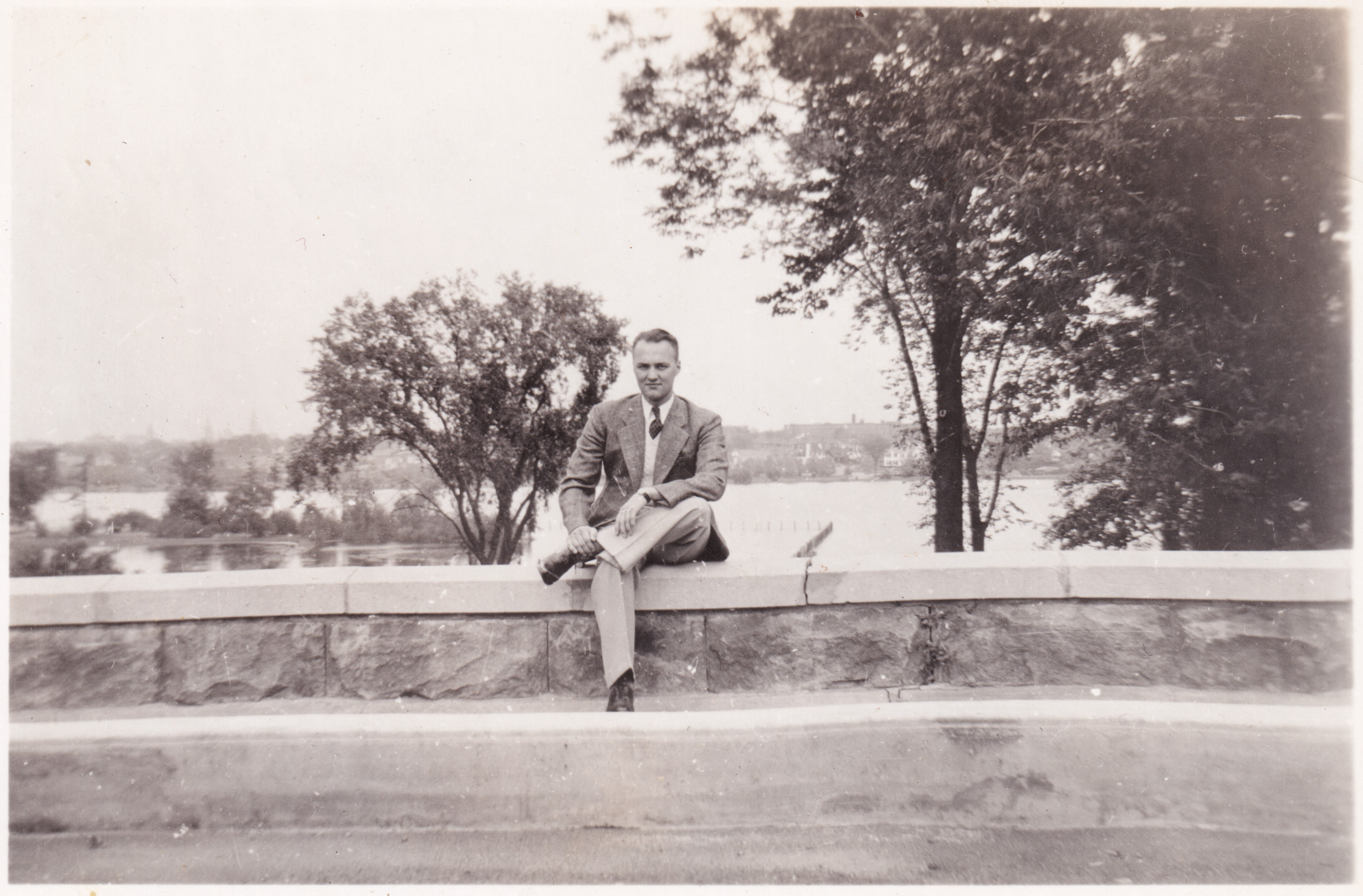
Higgitt at the "Lookout", Central Experimental Farm, Ottawa, 1941

From this point forward, Higgitt was in charge of liaison with the special Crown prosecutors at the series of criminal trials related to Gouzenko and had control of all of the exhibits and documents. Access to Gouzenko was kept to a minimum, with only two 'outsiders' allowed to speak with Gouzenko. One who travelled to Ottawa to meet Gouzenko was William Stephenson. Known by his wartime codename, Intrepid, and working out of an office in New York, Stephenson was the senior representative of the British Security Coordination (BSC) for the Western Allies during World War II, a covert wartime intelligence body run by MI6. The other who came to Ottawa was MI5's Roger Hollis, a British agent who oversaw the monitoring of communist threats against the British.

=== The Cold War Begins ===
Gouzenko's defection was one of the major catalysts for the beginning of the global Cold War, and compelled RCMP leadership to launch Operation West Wind in order to look into the appropriation and use of Canadian passports by Soviet illegals, and also to organize a special counter-espionage section of the RCMP, which Higgitt headed until 1952. This was a forerunner of the RCMP Security Service, an arm of the RCMP that had responsibility for domestic intelligence and security in Canada. While officer in charge of the counterespionage section, Higgitt, along with his colleagues in allied nations, did not believe that security screening at border crossings was alone proof against the penetration into Canada of Communist Bloc spies. Higgitt wrote to his superiors in 1952, shortly after two members of the Cambridge Five abruptly slipped behind the Iron Curtain and disappeared: "We feel a person who has been sent to Canada as a Soviet agent, is not likely to be one whose background, upon enquiry, will show any unusual or suspicious circumstances, but will undoubtedly be a person whose background has been well prepared so that nothing abnormal will become visible from even the closest scrutiny."

In April 1952, Higgitt was commissioned a Sub-Inspector and shortly afterwards became Inspector and Personnel Officer in Ontario. A year later, in 1953, Higgitt was involved in the coordination of the covert Operation Keystone, which centered around assessing the damage from the betrayal by a Mountie codenamed Long Knife, who had confessed to passing classified information to Soviet agents. This was the same year the KGB agent Yevgeni Brik, while living in Canada under the alias of David Soboloff, confessed to the RCMP Security Service that he had been running a Soviet spy ring inside Canada's top-secret Avro Arrow CF-105 interceptor program. Brik subsequently became a double-agent, the RCMP codenaming him Gideon, and most valuable spy for the West since World War II.

In late 1953, Higgitt moved to western Quebec to serve as Inspector at "C" Division, then in June 1954 was transferred to Montreal, Canada's largest urban center at the time, to take charge of the RCMP's Montreal Subdivision and supervise the RCMP's investigation and enforcement of the Canada Customs Act. Higgitt stayed in Montreal for three years. He was the personal escort to Princess Marina, Duchess of Kent, and her daughter Princess Alexandra during their visit to Quebec, including the Laurentians, in 1954, and went on to receive additional intensive training in undercover and surveillance operations by the RCMP in 1955. At this time Brik's whereabouts had become unknown after Brik's October 1955 rendezvous in Moscow with British SIS officer Daphne Park. He was presumed to have been executed by the KGB, but no one in the West was certain. Higgitt felt that the KBG, who did not know about Long Knife's confession, might send Brik back as a triple-agent.

=== Covert Operations ===
On January 1, 1956, a fire broke out on the third floor of the Soviet Embassy at 285 Charlotte Street in Ottawa. The blaze originated in the communications room, and Soviet officials delayed calling the fire department, opting instead to remove sensitive documents and equipment before allowing firefighters inside. After the fire, the Soviets relocated their embassy to 24 Blackburn Avenue while rebuilding the original site. During this reconstruction, the RCMP Security Service, working with British intelligence (MI5), infiltrated the construction site in an attempt to bug the new building. This covert effort was codenamed Operation Dew Worm. Shortly after Dew Worm, Australia's Charles Spry visited Ottawa to get advice from the RCMP on plans of the Australian Security Intelligence Organisation to run microphone operations against the Russians in the wake of the well-publicized defection of the Petrovs, the husband and wife who worked together inside the cipher section of the Russian Embassy in Canberra.

A year later, with assistance from MI5, the RCMP attempted to bug the under-construction Polish Consulate in Montreal, but the Urząd Bezpieczeństwa (Polish Intelligence) were tipped off by the KGB and the operation was aborted. In July 1957, just after Soviet spy Rudolf Abel was arrested by the FBI at the Latham Hotel in Manhattan, Higgitt was posted to the RCMP's Security and Intelligence at RCMP Headquarters in Ottawa. With the Security Service, Higgitt became the officer in charge of counterespionage under the Directorate of Security and Intelligence, replacing Terrance Guernsey, who wanted to see the Security Service separated from the RCMP. Higgitt was the "safe and reliable pick".

In October 1957, at the 27th meeting of the Security Sub-Panel, Higgitt informed Canada's Privy Council that members of the Soviet Military Attache's Office were covertly engaged in making extensive photographic and other records of military, hydro-electric, radio and electronic installations as well as coastlines and general topography throughout Eastern Canada. Two months later, in a secret December 1957 meeting at an Ottawa hotel, Higgitt discovered that Soviet agents had been attempting to recruit members of Higgitt's counterespionage unit responsible for surveillance of Soviet-bloc Embassy personnel in Ottawa. Higgitt was subsequently involved in the investigations of KGB agents Rem Krasilnikov and Nikolai Ostrovsky; this at a time when the sudden disappearance of British diplomats Guy Burgess and Donald Maclean stunned British and Canadian security officials and strained intelligence sharing with the United States.

=== British Intelligence ===
Three years later, 1960, Higgitt was assigned to London, England, where he served as Liaison Officer with MI6 and, later, with Western Europe via the Canadian Delegation to the General Assemblies of Interpol. While in London, in January 1961, long-time Soviet illegal and key figure in the Portland spy ring and what the newspapers called "The Microdot Five," Konon Molody, using the alias 'Gordon Lonsdale' after adopting the identity of a deceased Canadian child, was arrested on Waterloo Bridge. Two others of The Microdot Five apprehended in London, using the aliases 'Peter Kroger' and 'Helen Kroger,' also possessed false Canadian passports. Also in August 1961, a Soviet scientist, Dr. Mikhail A. Klochko, defected to Canada, and shortly thereafter the RCMP Security Service learned that Soviet Premier Nikita Khrushchev had personally passed the order, "Get Klochko", to the KGB's 13th Department.

Higgitt remained in Europe for three years, travelling extensively and working closely with police organizations and intelligence agencies throughout the continent. In 1961, while stationed in London, he established RCMP connections in The Hague, Cologne, Rome, Brussels, Malmö, at Interpol in Copenhagen with the Danish Minister of Justice, and at NATO headquarters in Paris. In 1962, Higgitt worked with Interpol in Madrid, and in 1963 in Helsinki. Higgitt made regular visits to Bonn to compare notes with Canada's Ambassador to West Germany, John Kennett Starnes, who was also head of the allied military mission to Berlin, which sought to collect intelligence on the Soviet military. Starnes eventually went on to become the Director of Canada's Security Service, replacing Higgitt in 1969 when Higgitt moved on from the head of the RCMP Security Service to take the job as head of the RCMP.

=== Promotion to Commissioner ===
Higgitt returned from London to Ottawa in 1963, ending his tenure with British Intelligence and taking the position of RCMP Security Service Superintendent. In 1965, KGB agent Olga Farmakovsky approached a Canadian newsreporter in Moscow hoping to defect to Canada. Higgitt turned the matter over to the CIA in Washington, who assisted Farmakovsky in making her way to Beirut and "out of Soviet hands." Upon interrogating Farmakovsky, the CIA concluded that she was in fact a plant, dispatched to the West. Sid Stein, the CIA man in Ottawa, told Higgitt not to allow Farmakovsky into Canada, that her interest was to spy on Washington, but Higgitt sided with British Intelligence, who had also interrogated Farmakovksy and concluded that she was no threat. In 1967, Higgitt became RCMP Assistant Commissioner and Director of RCMP Security and Intelligence. In this dual role he worked closely with counterparts in the United States and Europe to monitor communist movements.

In the late 1960s, Higgitt was also worried about the potential for racial violence in Canada, particularly in Halifax, Nova Scotia, with the presence there of radical US Black Panther members. In a secret report to the Government in 1968, Higgitt wrote that "The outside influence and support by US Black nationalists, coupled with revolutionary and militant support from organizations in Canada sympathetic to the Negroes' cause, could very well result in racial violence in Halifax and other centres in Canada having Negro communities". Community leaders in Halifax expressed concern that this worry, and the surveillance activities it induced, were discriminatory and meant to actually suppress the civil rights movement as opposed to keeping the peace.

In September 1969, Higgitt was promoted to Deputy RCMP Commissioner and became Director of Operations for all Criminal and Security Service matters throughout Canada. He held this position for only twenty-two days before being appointed RCMP Commissioner, over several of his senior officers, by Prime Minister Pierre Elliot Trudeau, on October 1, 1969. This was the RCMP's fourteenth commissioner. John Starnes was also considered for the position.

Upon his appointment, at the height of the Cold War, The New York Times described Higgitt as being "in the tradition of quiet‐spoken, approachable but tough headed men who hardly ever, by word or deed, draw attention to themselves". This made sense given Higgitt's background in intelligence and counterintelligence going all the way back to WWII: "[Higgitt] talked about communist spies like they were the boy next door, implying that he knew them and their methods so well that they can hardly surprise him".

Reader's Digest described "greying, magnetic" Higgitt as "a tough, 53-year-old lawman who worked his way up through the ranks. Higgitt rarely talks publicly about the RCMP, but he runs his 11,250-man organization with the kind of quiet devotion to duty that filled history books with stories of heroic RCMP feats." The Calgary Herald said that Higgitt and the FBI's J. Edgar Hoover have many things in common: "They are relentless civil police officers. They seldom put themselves in public view. And they have reputations for being hard to get to know". Higgitt continued his duties as commissioner on a one-year extension granted by Canada's solicitor-general. Upon his promotion to commissioner, Higgitt told the Los Angeles Times, "I believe Canada has the greatest, most efficient and most human police force in the world". Following his appointment as commissioner, Higgitt was unanimously elected a vice-president of Interpol, and he received a tipstaff at the 65th annual conference of the Canadian Association of Chiefs of Police, London, Ontario.

== RCMP Commissioner ==
In 1970, Commissioner Higgitt announced the construction of a police computer service that at $5 million a year would see the linking of the RCMP to Provincial Police forces in Canada and the end of long rows of grey filing cabinets at RCMP Headquarters. This computer system also had swift relays with the FBI in the United States, processing in seconds information on criminal activity—stolen cars and fugitives—that had formerly taken days. This all came at a time of increasingly tense domestic and global Cold War politics, and indeed in the midst of increasing mutual assistance between the FBI and the RCMP with security information about individuals in both countries apparently conducting subversive or espionage operations with American and/or Canadian significance.

In his first official press interview upon his appointment as RCMP Commissioner, Higgitt was asked whether he thought a Chinese Communist Embassy in Ottawa would pose a new security problem for the federal police. Higgitt's immediate answer, widely circulated throughout Canadian media, was that a Chinese Communist presence in Canada would indeed require heightened police vigilance; an answer which displeased Trudeau, who had pressed hard for Canada-China negotiations and a diplomatic exchange between Ottawa and Beijing. Higgitt's opinion was that the presence of a Communist Chinese embassy in Ottawa would increase espionage activity in Canada, even if diplomatic links might outweigh those disadvantages. For many American security officials, this was putting it mildly, as they anticipated that Chinese spies in Canada would be gathering information not so much about Canada as the United States. In this first interview Higgitt was also asked about political movements and political protesting on the domestic front. His stated belief was that anybody has a perfect right to get up on a street corner and advocate a change in government, and the police should only intervene when dissenters resort to subversive tactics.

This was also a time when the press were charging that the RCMP was "hung up on its image", that in pursuit of their duties the Mounties were infringing on civil rights, and that some of the RCMP's undercover work was illegal. In a 1970 interview with United Press International (UPI), Higgitt's response to these charges was that they were invalid:

There is no police force in the western world which isn't in trouble today, in one way or another. Solomon himself couldn't avoid it. I suppose people basically don't like policemen. [But] I have said it many times and I'll say it again. This is one of the greatest polices forces in the world. A police force is in an indefensible position. We have a trust to the people of Canada -- to keep in confidence things that would embarrass people and affect careers. We will not break that trust.

=== Relations With The FBI ===
When Higgitt took office as Commissioner, the Vietnam War was reaching its peak; US President Lyndon Johnson approving an increased maximum of number of US troops. Higgitt, new Security Service Director General John Starnes, and RCMP Inspector Louis G. Pantry, the Mounties' liaison officer in Washington DC, met with FBI Director J. Edgar Hoover and Chief Inspector William C. Sullivan at the FBI headquarters in Washington, in March 1970. Afterward, public criticism emerged that the RCMP, under Higgitt's leadership and acting for the American FBI, was harassing US draft dodgers and deserters seeking refuge in Canada. Higgitt told the UPI that this was not so. "We have conducted no interviews on the FBI's behalf. If the FBI asks if someone is in Canada, we tell them yes or no. After all, they have committed a criminal offence under US law, so this is straight cooperation between police forces. We ask the same from them. But we don't even give the draft dodger's addresses in Canada, only whether they are in the country. William W. Turner, former FBI agent and author of Hoover's FBI: The Man and the Myth, claimed that the RCMP were turning over US deserters to American border officials. Turner's remarks were televised on Weekend, a CBC news program. Higgitt denied the allegations the following day: "There is absolutely nothing like this going on. I saw the show... This is the first I've heard of it, and I don't believe it. It's the same old allegations made time after time after time."

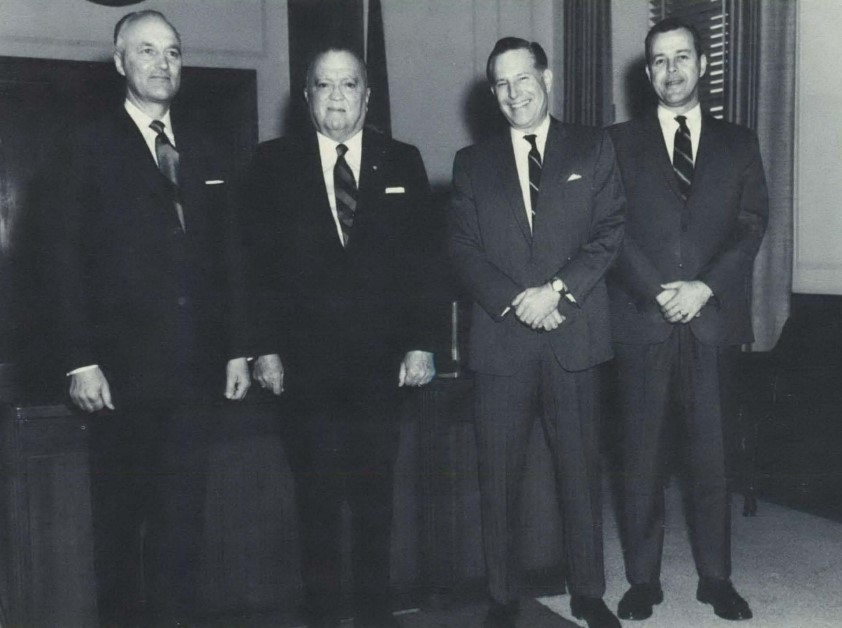
Higgitt with J. Edgar Hoover, RCMP Security Service Director John Starnes, and RCMP Inspector Louis G. Pantry, Washington DC

There was more tension with President Richard Nixon's visit to Ottawa in April 1972, which was only a month before Higgitt returned to Washington to attend Hoover's funeral. In October of the year prior Soviet Premier Alexei Kosykin was assaulted by a political protester, and a number of groups had indicated that they would use the Nixon visit as a peg for demonstrations on Parliament Hill against the Vietnam conflict and US economic doctrines. The question of who was to run the security show during the presidential visit to Canada was a sensitive one at the time because it touched upon Canadian sovereignty. White House Secret Service insisted that Higgitt and the RCMP were calling the shots, but the media disputed this.

=== Cold War Espionage ===
Canada's Cabinet Committee on Security and Intelligence met on 19 December 1969, and suggested that Canada should expand its capacity to gather intelligence abroad. In January 1970, Higgitt and Starnes met with Prime Minister Trudeau, then flew to London for a week to visit the headquarters of MI5 and SIS, and meet with leaders of Britain's intelligence community. Priorities for Higgitt and Starnes were separatism and the close international connections that tied revolutionary groups from Cuba to Europe to the Middle East. In the first part of 1970 the police foiled two kidnapping attempts, first against an Israeli consul and then against the US consul in Montreal. Tensions between the RCMP and the Trudeau Government regarding Maoist China continued as well.

==== "Subversive Activity" ====
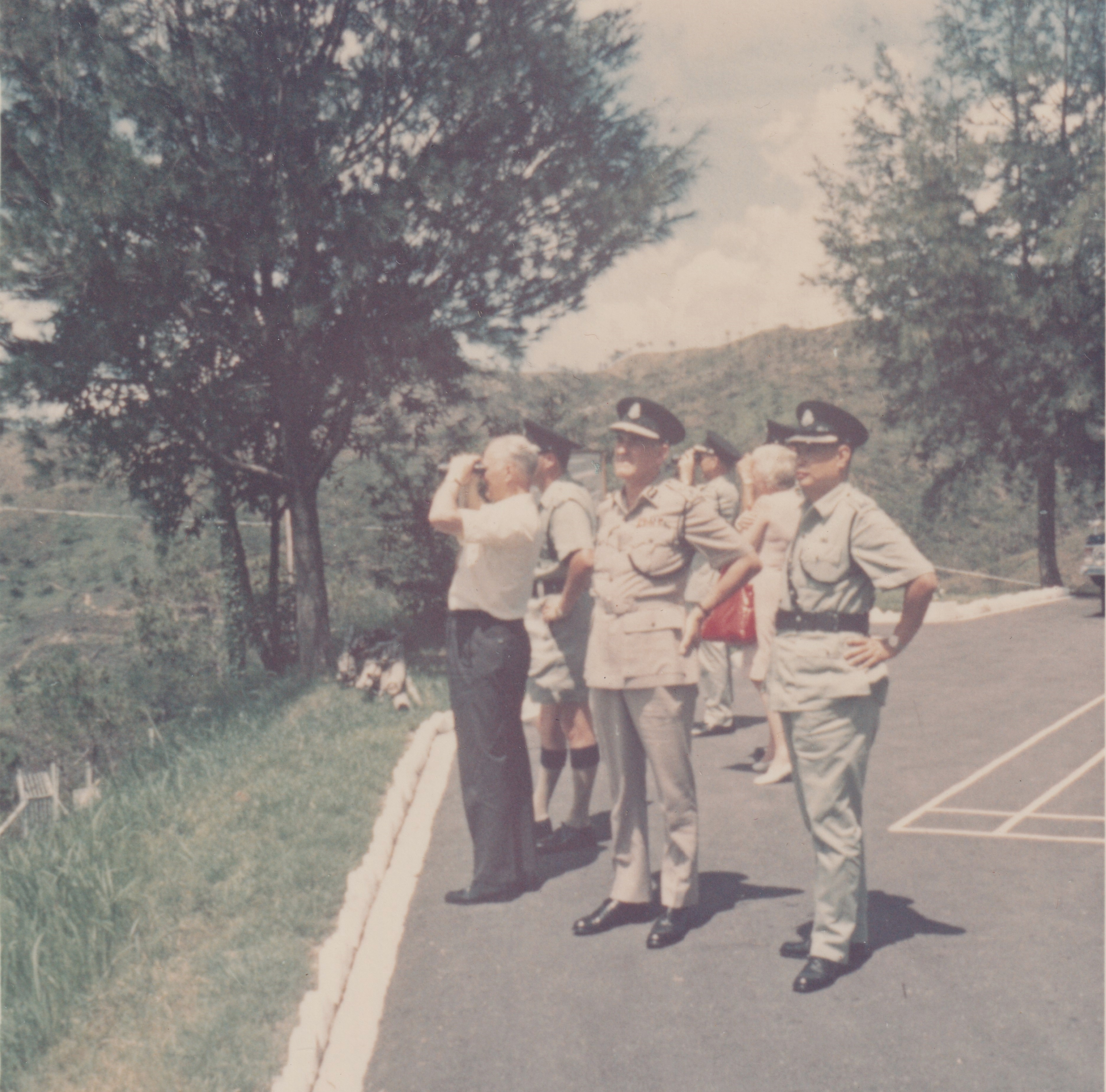
Higgitt at Lok Ma Chau, Hong Kong, looking across the border to mainland China, 1970

In May 1971, after Canada and China had agreed to exchange ambassadors, Higgitt was brought before a Commons Judicial Committee to testify about communist espionage. He was asked by MP Harold Stafford if he maintained his 1969 position that the new embassy would mean an increase in subversion. "That was not quite my statement," Higgitt replied. Higgitt said that he had been asked at a news conference whether a mainland Chinese embassy would result in more agents in Canada. "In 1969," Higgitt continued, "the obvious answer had to be yes". When Stafford pressed the point, Solicitor-General Jean-Pierre Goyer, who had authorized the wiretapping operation, Operation Cobra, against the militant Agence de Presse Libre du Quebec (APLQ), intervened to say an improper picture of relations with Communist countries shouldn't be developed, as relations are excellent. Goyer went on to defend the Mounties, maintaining that the RCMP was obliged to often engage in surveillance in order to gather intelligence on foreign and domestic subversive activity. MP Donald Stovel Macdonald asked Higgitt to define subversive activity. Higgitt's response was that this is a most difficult question that anybody could be asked to answer; that the RCMP and the Canadian Government have argued for years on what a proper definition of subversive activity is.

Generally speaking, I think probably an acceptable definition [of subversive activity] is trying to achieve some political purpose by illegal means, or improper means, and trying to destroy the institutions of the country by nondemocratic means, I suppose, if that's understandable.

Less than a year after Higgitt's testimony, in April 1972, the Cuba Trade Commission in Montreal was bombed, killing one Cuban and injuring seven others. Seven Cubans were detained and six were charged with weapons possession and interfering with a police investigation which saw the RCMP locate an electronic bomb-firing device as well as a Cuban code book. From Havana, an angered Cuban President, Fidel Castro, charged the Mounties with “brutal and fascist methods” in their handling of the affair. The FBI concluded that the electronic firing device was "quite similar" to that which the US Coast Guard recovered from the attempted bombing of the British deep sea freighter Lancastrian Prince three hundred miles east of Miami, Florida in 1968.

Higgitt also directed RCMP operations during the FLQ Crisis in Quebec in 1970, which was the last time the War Measures Act would be invoked until Justin Trudeau declared a public order emergency in 2022. During the late 1960s and early 1970s, relations between Canada and France were strained because of what was perceived as official French sympathy for those in Quebec who wanted to take the province out of the Canadian confederation. According to an August 1981 report of the Canadian Broadcasting Corporation (CBC), the Trudeau government at the time believed that French intelligence agents in Quebec were funneling money to pro-separatist groups. In June 1970, a bomb had gone off at National Defense Headquarters in Ottawa, killing telecommunications operator Jeanne d'Arc Saint-Germain. The bombing was attributed to the FLQ. Other bombings in Montreal over the month of July increased the pressure on the RCMP to bring to justice those responsible and to identify their supporters. The CBC said that in the fall of 1970, Trudeau met with Higgitt and John Starnes, and approved plans for spying on French diplomats. Trudeau was said to have told Higgitt and Starnes that he would deny any knowledge of the operation if it was ever discovered.

Concerned that things had gotten out of control, by 1977 a Royal Commission was formed by Justice David McDonald titled "Royal Commission of Inquiry into Certain Activities of the RCMP" to investigate allegations of vast wrongdoing by the national police force. In addition to the covert Operation Cathedral, the McDonald Inquiry probed the "countering activities" Operation Oddball and Operation Checkmate undertaken by the RCMP Security Service's super-secret 'E Special' unit. When the McDonald Inquiry concluded in 1981, it was recommended that the RCMP's role in intelligence operations be limited, which ultimately resulted in the formation of the Canadian Security Intelligence Service three years later.

=== The October Crisis ===
Federal ministers from Quebec, including Prime Minister Trudeau, believed that the FLQ Crisis only became a crisis because the intelligence on Quebec separatism gathered by the RCMP Security Service was inadequate, if not worse. What followed in the 1970s was a much more aggressive and intrusive pattern of intelligence targeting of Quebec separatism by the Security Service, which blew up in the face of the government with a series of public scandals of RCMP "wrongdoing"—actions that went beyond lawful limits or were seriously questionable from the standpoint of liberal democratic ethics. Whitaker summarizes the situation like this: In effect, the government blamed the RCMP for originally not doing enough, then later blamed the RCMP for going too far, then took matters into their own hands with the War Measures Act.

Higgitt opposed the use of the War Measures Act by the Government of Pierre Elliot Trudeau, which gave the police and military special powers to crack down on the FLQ. According to journalist Peter C. Newman, "[u]nlike most police officers faced by persistent politicians, Higgitt proved to be very tough, very precise, and equally persistent." On October 13, 1970, Trudeau famously told CBC reporter Tim Ralfe, "Well, just watch me", after Ralfe questioned Trudeau on how far he would go in the suspension of civil liberties to maintain order. A day later, in a confidential Ottawa meeting with Trudeau, Deputy Minister of Justice Don Maxwell, and Lieutenant General Michael Dare, Higgitt argued against the Act's use; telling Trudeau it would be a heavy-handed overstep. Higgitt warned that a broad sweep and preventative detention of suspects in Quebec was not likely to lead to the abductors of the Deputy Premier, Pierre Laporte, and the British Trade Commissioner, James Cross, and that "[these events] ought not to be allowed to over-rule calmer reaction at the federal level." Only Maxwell agreed with Higgitt. According to security and intelligence scholar, Reg Whitaker, Trudeau and his cabinet deliberately exaggerated the crisis to obtain emergency powers to intimidate Quebec separatists. Trudeau cabinet minister, Don Jamieson, recalled that Higgitt confirmed that the War Measures Act had produced nothing of any consequence to the RCMP's investigations.

To the question of why Higgitt wasn't listened to by Trudeau in 1970, Starnes put it this way in 1992:

It is difficult, so long after the event, to know why more weight wasn't given to the RCMP Commissioner's views. I suspect it may have been due, in part, to Len Higgitt's style and how he was regarded within the bureaucracy. He was not comfortable with the abstract, often woolly ideas and philosophical concepts that were a hallmark of various Trudeau administrations, preferring pragmatic, straightforward approaches to solutions. Although he could be articulate what he said usually was couched in unadorned, even blunt, language. Len Higgitt sometimes gave the impression of being a simple man, but he was not. He had an undeveloped natural subtleness of mind that many of his detractors failed to perceive and take into account. He never adapted to the trendy phrases and catchy "buzz words" then much in vogue in the bureaucracy. As a consequence, what he said was sometimes discounted by his peers, and by some ministers.

Further insight into Higgitt's "style" can be found in Higgitt's admiration of Frank Zaneth, who as Canada's first undercover Mountie infiltrated gangs and the early forms of organized crime. "Frank was not a very popular person within the RCMP, particularly with some of the brass -- people whom he knew when he was serving in the ranks... He was just absolutely straight forward and dead honest. The man had very unusual standards of behavior and was not necessarily the most diplomatic person. Frank was a very direct individual. He would express his views and his findings without hesitation. You knew exactly where you were with the man, which is the kind of person I like."

Higgitt called the two kidnappings and murder by FLQ operatives "probably the most vicious and complicated crimes ever committed in Canada". Many Members of Parliament came to agree, and questions were asked as to both the excessiveness of the War Measures Act and the failures in intelligence gathering that allowed such events to transpire. Simultaneously, critique was also turned toward the Mounties' increasing use of electronic surveillance in the name of 'public safety'. The conflicting interests, then, against the backdrop of ongoing socio-cultural change in Canada, demanded close analysis. The October Crisis and the use of the War Measures Act led to an official critical review of the security and intelligence situation in Canada called the Royal Commission on Security, chaired by Maxwell Mackenzie. Higgitt was questioned, in 1971, by Mackenzie and a House of Commons committee regarding what he knew about the RCMP's law-bending or law-violating methods in intelligence gathering. Higgitt denied having any knowledge of RCMP officers' wiretapping and unlawful break-ins, and the Royal Commission inquiry ultimately produced no evidence that he did know. Globe and Mail journalist Jeff Sallot drew this conclusion: "A trim man even in his fifties, he [(Higgitt)] looked every inch the policeman who had risen to the top because of his intelligence, dedication, and honest hard work. His sharp facial features betrayed no hint that he knew about skeletons in the closet. But in thirty-six years with the force he had learned a lot, especially about how to keep secrets".

Upon completing its report, the Commission recommended that a new civilian non-police agency be established to perform the functions of a security service in Canada instead of the RCMP. This eventually led, in 1984, to the establishment of the Canadian Security Intelligence Service (CSIS), effectively creating a separation of domestic policing and foreign intelligence in Canada similar to the distinction between the FBI and the CIA in the United States. In an address to the Security Panel (a senior interdepartmental committee of officials), Higgitt termed the recommendation for a separate civilian intelligence service "a travesty of justice," and added that "the Soviet Intelligence would be jubilant. They could never hope to duplicate the accomplishment".

=== Kainai Chieftainship ===
Higgitt organized the RCMP Centennial Celebrations in 1973. In early July of that year, in formal ceremonies marking the Centenary, Higgitt along with Queen Elizabeth met Chief David Ahenakew, leader of the Federation of Saskatchewan Indian Nations, and later with Cree activist Harold Cardinal, Indian Association of Alberta. As many Canadian news media outlets of the time reported, Ahenakew went off program after presenting the Queen with a peace-pipe and affirming the Indigenous Peoples of Saskatchewan's ongoing faithfulness to her and the treaties made between Indians and the Canadian Government: Ahenakew told the Queen and Higgitt that Indigenous Peoples "have been prisoners under the yoke of dependency imposed by the Government", and that "over the years some of your representatives have not respected their commitments". Higgitt also met with Chief Joe Crowfoot, 77-year-old member of the Blackfoot tribe at Cluny, Alberta, and grandson of Chief Crowfoot of the Blackfoot Confederacy, Kainai Nation, who in 1877 negotiated peace with the Mounties' first Commissioner, Lieutenant-Colonel James Macleod. Higgitt told Crowfoot, "You put us on a pedestal. You gave us a very heavy responsibility then -- one of conducting ourselves so that you will never be sorry you put us up there in the first place."

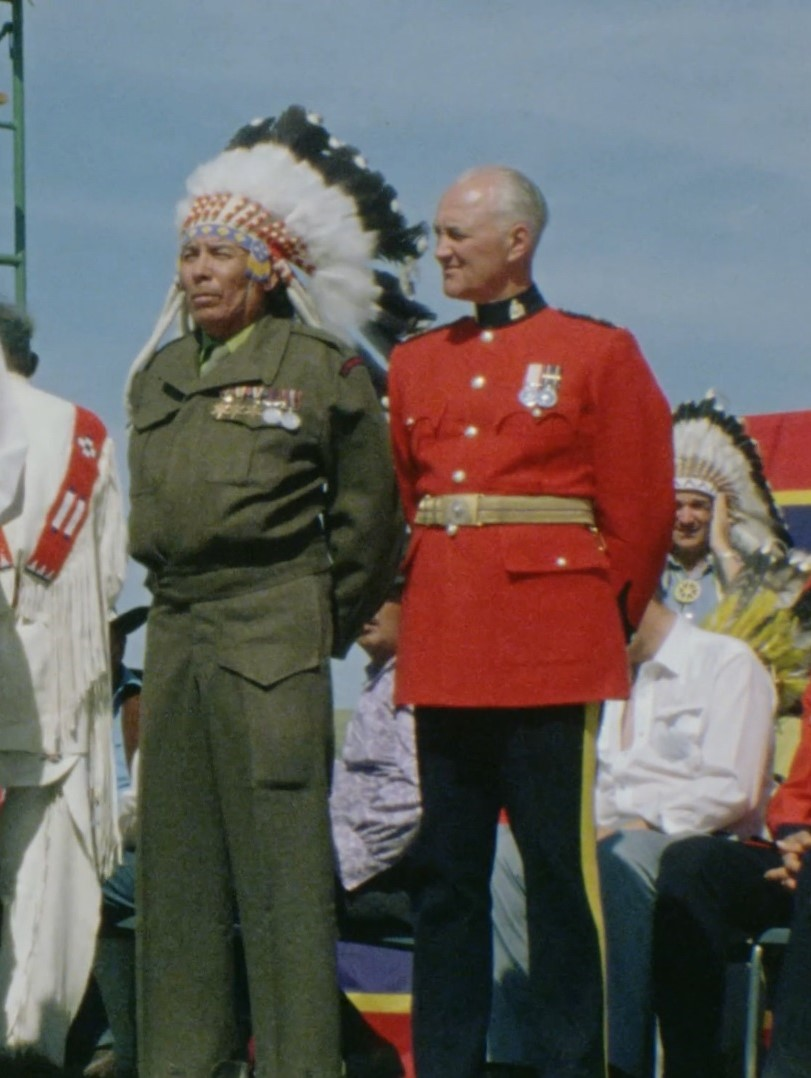
Higgitt with WWII veteran Pat Eagle Child, Standoff, Alberta

In late July 1973, in Standoff, Alberta, Higgitt was honored with a Kainai Chieftainship by the Blood Indian Band on the Blood Reserve. The Canadian historian Pierre Berton was also given a Chieftainship at the same ceremony, and in Berton's autobiography Berton said it was one of the greatest honors of both his and Higgitt's lives: "The Commissioner of the RCMP, W.L. Higgitt, who was also being awarded with an eagle feather headdress, turned to me in a deadpan voice and whispered, 'We must be prepared to sell our lives as dearly as possible!'."

Higgitt was given the Blackfoot name "Great Chief" and was presented with a head-dress and peace pipe by Joe Chief Body, Bob Black Plume, and Blood Reserve war veteran Pat Eaglechild. In turn, Higgitt and Sgt. B. Thorstad, NCO in charge of the RCMP's Cardston Detachment, presented Chief Jim Shot Both Sides with an honorary RCMP Centenary Winchester Rifle in appreciation of the one hundred years of peaceful association between the Blood Tribe and the RCMP; pledging that the RCMP would continue to work in the service of the Kainai and the Blackfoot Confederacy. Centennial neck medallions were also given to other present-day Chiefs of the tribes involved in the signing of Treaty 7: Chief Leo Pretty Young Man of the Blackfoot Band, Chief Gordon Crowchild of the Sarcee Band, Chief John Snow of the Wesley Band, and Chief Frank Kaquitts of the Chiniquay Band. In her address to Higgitt and the assembled Chiefs, Alberta Indian Princess Jenny Fox said: "I'm very happy to see so many people down here to honor the RCMP and new members of the Kainai Chieftainship. In spite of all the criticism and unfairness that some people give to the RCMP, we have to admit one thing, and that is that they have given us one of the most important things in our society today, that which is law and order".

Higgitt was also appointed Commander in the Most Venerable Order of the Hospital of St. John of Jerusalem (Order of St. John), invested with the insignia of that rank in 1971 by Governor General Roland Michener. He was awarded the Canadian Centennial Medal and the RCMP Long Service Medal.

== President of Interpol ==
Higgitt served in London as the RCMP Liaison Officer for the United Kingdom and Western Europe, and was a member of the Canadian Delegation to the General Assemblies of Interpol in 1961, in Copenhagen, and 1962, in Madrid. As RCMP Commissioner he also led the Canadian Delegation to Mexico City in 1969. In 1971, while Higgitt was RCMP Commissioner, Canada and the RCMP hosted the 40th General Assembly of Interpol in Ottawa, which featured fifty delegations representing national policing organizations across the world. In 1972, at Interpol's 41st Plenary Meeting in Frankfurt, Higgitt was elected President of Interpol. This marked the first time a president from outside Europe was elected. Higgitt's first year as President of Interpol coincided with his final year as RCMP Commissioner.

Higgitt set currency counterfeiting and the growing global narcotics trade as Interpol's top priorities, and in one of his first moves as president, Higgitt and Paul Dickopf, along with Interpol Secretary-General Jean Népote, representing the Interpol Executive Committee, met in Washington with Kenneth S. Giannoules of the United States Secret Service to discuss Interpol's Narcotics Intelligence Program. Higgitt also sought to keep politics out of Interpol, telling the 45th Annual General Assembly of Interpol in Accra, Ghana, that Interpol operated under no racial discrimination nor political influence. Likewise, Higgitt told the London Sunday Times in 1974 that if Interpol became a political body like the United Nations, debating definitions of terrorism, it would find itself increasingly unsuccessful in its intelligence-gathering operations and eventually break apart. This statement came in the wake of the Lod Airport massacre in Israel, planned and carried out in 1972 by the Japanese Red Army, a Marxist group that had grown out of the student protest movement at Japanese universities and by the 1970s had expanded its field of operations across the globe.

1972 was also the year Canadian Justice Minister, John Turner, and the Commons Justice and Legal Affairs Committee became interested in the intelligence-gathering methods of the RCMP's Security Service and Criminal Investigations Branch; in particular whether any of their methods were unlawful. Higgitt appeared before the Committee on May 29, 1973, to testify. He denied that the RCMP engaged in wiretapping surveillance practices, even though suspicion about the RCMP had prompted Turner to propose Criminal Code amendments which would outlaw all forms of electronic eavesdropping, except by police, who would be required to obtain a search warrant either from a judge in criminal cases or the solicitor-general in national security cases. There was no indication that Higgitt knew at the time of his testifying that the RCMP's Criminal Investigations Branch had used or was using wiretapping.

== Retirement ==
Commissioner Higgitt retired from Interpol in 1976; going on to serve for several years as president of Canada's Safety Council. In May 1978, Higgitt, promoting Child Safety Week, wrote "Whatever we offer to our children will be meaningless if we are unable to offer them the most important thing of all: a safe, happy life."

In October 1978, just after the Canadian Government expelled thirteen suspected Soviet spies from Ottawa, the largest diplomatic expulsion in Canadian history, Higgitt was called before the Royal Commission of Inquiry Concerning Certain Activities of the RCMP. Higgitt testified that he was unaware that the force had burned a barn, stolen dynamite, issued a fake terrorist communique and taken Parti Quebecois membership lists—four of eleven areas of investigation by the Inquiry. In a follow-up testimony in 1980, Higgitt said that in his capacity as RCMP Commissioner, he and Director General of the RCMP's Security Service, John Kennett Starnes, had discussed with Cabinet Ministers, including Turner and other senior Canadian Government officials, the possibility of surveilling foreign agents via electronic eavesdropping, and of similar intelligence-gathering methods in the wake of the bombings during the FLQ crisis. Higgitt maintained that his "political masters" in Ottawa had given their implied consent to the use of wiretapping and other forms of electronic surveillance.

Higgitt died in Ottawa on April 2, 1989, and was buried in the RCMP cemetery in Regina, Saskatchewan. He told the Winnipeg Free Press in 1972, "If I had it to do over again, I would do exactly the same thing I have done. And I wouldn't be the slightest bit concerned whether I ended up as Commissioner or not." "As a lone Mountie bugler played the Last Post, a troop of scarlet-clad fellow officers and a small gathering of family and friends paid their last respects to a man known by many as a great Canadian". During his eulogy in the RCMP Chapel, Regina, Assistant Commissioner Cortlandt Macdonell praised his former commanding officer as the man who set the standard for his fellow Mounties. "His indeed was a lifetime dedicated not only to the people of Canada but to democracy".

Police appointments
Preceded by Malcolm Lindsay	Commissioner of the Royal Canadian Mounted Police; 1969-1973	Succeeded by Maurice Nadon
