= Louis Desmarais =

Canadian politician

Member of the Canadian Parliament for Dollard
- In office 1979–1984
- Preceded by: Jean-Pierre Goyer
- Succeeded by: Gerry Weiner

Personal details
- Born: 16 February 1923 Sudbury, Ontario, Canada
- Died: 25 March 2017 (aged 94) Montreal, Quebec, Canada
- Party: Liberal

Louis R. Desmarais (16 February 1923 – 25 March 2017) was a Liberal party member of the House of Commons of Canada. He was a Chartered Accountant by career.

== Biography ==
In 1968, he became president of Les Entreprises de Transport Provincial limitée, and he was president of Canada Steamship Lines, whose head manager in Quebec City was André Poliquin.

He represented the riding of Dollard since his victory there in the 1979 federal election and his re-election in 1980. Desmarais was defeated in the 1984 federal election by Gerry Weiner of the Progressive Conservative Party. He served in the 31st and 32nd Canadian Parliaments.

His brother Jean Noël Desmarais was a physician and senator, and his brother Paul Desmarais was a billionaire businessman.
