= Paul Dickopf =

German police chief (1910–1973)

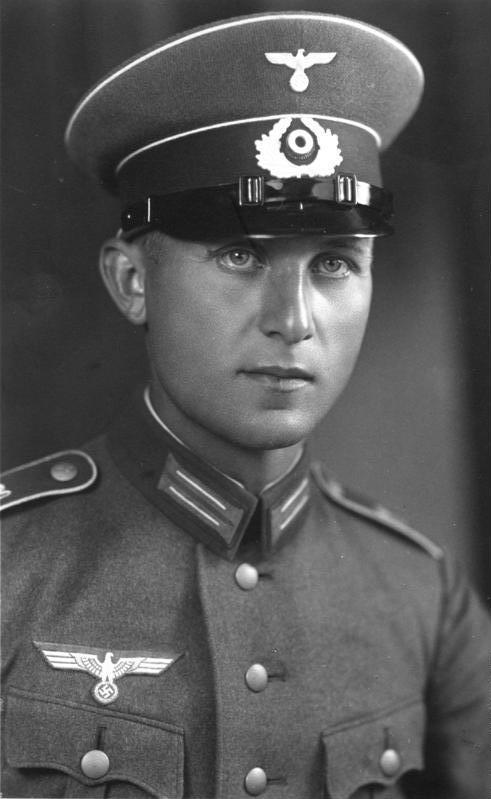
- Dickopf in 1935

President of INTERPOL
- In office 1968–1972
- Preceded by: Firmin Franssen
- Succeeded by: William Higgitt

Personal details
- Born: June 9, 1910 Müschenbach, German Empire
- Died: September 19, 1973 (aged 63) Bonn, West Germany

Paul (Paulinus) Dickopf (June 9, 1910 – September 19, 1973) was a member of the NSDAP and SS in the Security Service (SD) and a secret agent in Switzerland, who became a member of the German Federal Criminal Police Office (BKA). Between 1965 and 1971, he was the 4th president of the BKA and a paid "unilateral agent" of the CIA.

While Dickopf himself was not directly involved in war crimes, he did protect many former Nazis who were war criminals.

== Career ==
Under the Nazi government of Adolf Hitler, he was a member of the Sturmabteilung and the Schutzstaffel. Dickopf, before and during World War II had been an active Nazi officer in the Schutzstaffel (SS) with SS number 337259. Dickopf's SS personnel file reveals that he became a member in 1935 of the National Socialist German Students' League (Nationalsozialistischer Deutscher Studentenbund; abbreviated NSDStB) having the same status and membership requirements of the official Nazi Party, the Nationalsozialistische Deutsche Arbeiterpartei (NSDAP).

After voluntary army service (1934-1935) he began his police career in 1937 at the Kriminal-Polizei ('Kripo'- Criminal Police) as a criminal commissar candidate serving the last three months in the Sicherheitsdienst des Reichsführers-SS. In 1938 he volunteered for the Führerschule (leadership school) of 'Sipo' (Sicherheits-Polizei - Security Police). Fifteen SS officers of the rank of lieutenant upwards sponsored him. Dickopf was recommended for officer rank by the commandant of the SD school and graduated as an SS Untersturmführer (Lieutenant) became a criminal commissar and member of the SD. Dickopf later enrolled in the general SS in 1939, however, any record of his war activities are obscure since his SS file for that period is incomplete.

Between 1965 and 1971 Dickopf headed the German Federal Criminal Police Office (BKA). He was dismissed after mounting criticism concerning his administration of the BKA. Hans-Dietrich Genscher nonetheless praised him as a "role model for the German police".

Dickopf was elected as the president of Interpol in 1968, apparently aided by the contacts of François Genoud to the Arab world. . While his former Nazi connections were known, he maintained his post until 1972.

Dickopf died after a brief illness on September 19, 1973, in Bonn, Germany.

On June 25, 2012, the "Paul-Dickopf-Straße", a street in Meckenheim, seat of the BKA, bearing Dickopf's name as a remembrance for his presidency of the BKA, was renamed "Gerhard-Boeden-Straße" as a symbolic act following the revelations about Dickopf's masterminding the recruiting of former Nazi officials into the BKA.

== Infiltration of the BKA by former Nazi officials ==
After his death it was revealed that Dickopf had made the Federal Criminal Police a safe haven for former Nazi and SS officials, a large number of them war criminals. Under his leadership some concepts of National Socialism were still upheld and practised. For example, one similarity was the way members of Sinti and Roma were treated.

== Secret cooperation with the CIA ==
According to documents in the National Archives in Washington, which were released in 2007, the CIA made payments to Dickopf from 1965 to 1971, while he was president of the BKA. He is categorized in the files as a "unilateral agent". One note about Dickopf by the then head of the CIA says: '"Our relationship with Mr Dickopf is mainly of a secret nature, the official contacts being used as a cover up for meetings". Dickopf passed on to the CIA information on leading officials as well as on internal affairs of the BKA and other authorities.
