= Malcolm Lindsay =

Canadian police commissioner (1909–1983)

Malcolm Francis Aylesworth Lindsay (February 4, 1909 – May 3, 1983) was the 14th commissioner of the Royal Canadian Mounted Police, serving from August 15, 1967 to September 30, 1969.

He served as Mountie from 1934 to 1969.

== Honoured Received ==
- RCMP Long Service Medal
- The Canadian Centennial Medal
- Queen Elizabeth II Coronation Medal

Police appointments
Preceded by George McClellan	Commissioner of the Royal Canadian Mounted Police; 1967-1969	Succeeded by William Higgitt
