= Alberta Provincial Police =

Canadian police force from 1917–1932

- Badge of the APP
- Abbreviation: APP
- Motto: Fiat justitia (Latin for 'Let justice be done')

Agency overview
- Formed: 1917
- Dissolved: 1932

Jurisdictional structure
- Legal jurisdiction: Alberta

Operational structure
- Headquarters: Edmonton Barracks
- Sworn members: 201

Facilities
- Barracks: 105

Official emblazonment of the APP's badge

The Alberta Provincial Police (APP) was the provincial police service for the province of Alberta, Canada, from 1917 to 1932. The APP was formed as a result of the Royal North-West Mounted Police (RNWMP) leaving the prairie provinces during the First World War due to a lack of sufficient resources in light of its increased responsibilities for national security and reluctance to again enforce Prohibition law recently put into effect by the Alberta government after its experience doing so during territorial times. The RNWMP was replaced by the newly created Alberta Provincial Police on March 1, 1917, which remained responsible for provincial policing until 1932, when it was eliminated as a cost-cutting measure during the Great Depression. The APP was known for its tumultuous beginning, battles against rum-runners and bootleggers during prohibition in Canada and the United States, as well as its remarkable efficiency and professionalism which endeared the force to Albertans.

On November 9, 2019, Premier Jason Kenney announced a panel exploring the benefits of reinstating the APP, along with other policies regarding the return of federal programs to Alberta's jurisdiction.

Today the Royal Canadian Mounted Police's K Division is responsible for provincial policing in Alberta and the Alberta Sheriffs Branch is responsible for additional provincial law enforcement.

== History ==
=== North-West Mounted Police in Alberta ===
Policing of the area now known as the Province of Alberta began in 1874 with the creation of the North-West Mounted Police (NWMP). King Edward VII, awarded the title Royal to the North-West Mounted Police (RNWMP) in 1904. Upon Alberta entering Confederation in 1905, Wilfrid Laurier proposed that the mounted police should remain in the new provinces, under contract to the provincial authorities for $75,000 per year apiece – about one-third of the actual operational cost – a solution which was approved by both sides. The workload on the police grew quickly as a consequence, with the criminal cases being handled almost trebling between 1905 and 1912 to over 13,000. Despite complaints from Commissioner Aylesworth Bowen Perry, the government refused to increase the establishment of the mounted police. By 1913, the provinces were expressing dissatisfaction about the service being delivered. Tensions grew between temperance campaigners and soldiers over the implementation of the liquor laws. The police barracks in Calgary were attacked in October 1916 by a crowd of over two hundred soldiers and civilians, who were trying to release six soldiers arrested for alcohol offences. The building was destroyed, one police officer was shot and several more injured.

The effects of the First World War weighed heavily on the RNWMP throughout Canada, as young Canadian men joined the Canadian Expeditionary Force in large numbers. The Mounties were charged with additional security responsibilities such as control, monitoring and registration of enemy aliens, greater surveillance of the Canada–United States border between Lake of the Woods in Ontario and the eastern slopes of the Rocky Mountains, guarding prisoners and investigations into complaints against enemy aliens. The RNWMP also established a special squadron of 150 men in Regina for the purpose of controlling riots and insurrections.

Owing to these greater responsibilities, which came without additional funding, on June 20, 1916, Commissioner Perry advised the federal government that the RNWMP law enforcement contract with the prairie provinces should be temporarily suspended for the duration of the First World War. Commissioner Perry reached out to the prairie provinces to negotiate agreements to suspend police services, and while the government of Saskatchewan was agreeable to the temporary change in policing, the Alberta government remained uncertain. Alberta's government under Premier Arthur Sifton agreed to the change following a telegram from Prime Minister Robert Borden on November 25, 1916, and the necessary Order-in-Councils were passed by the federal government in Ottawa a few days later on November 29, 1916. RNWMP services in Alberta would cease at midnight on December 31, 1916; however, the Alberta government was not prepared to stand-up a police force with only a months notice, so Borden extended the handover date to March 1, 1917.

=== Early days of the Alberta Provincial Police ===
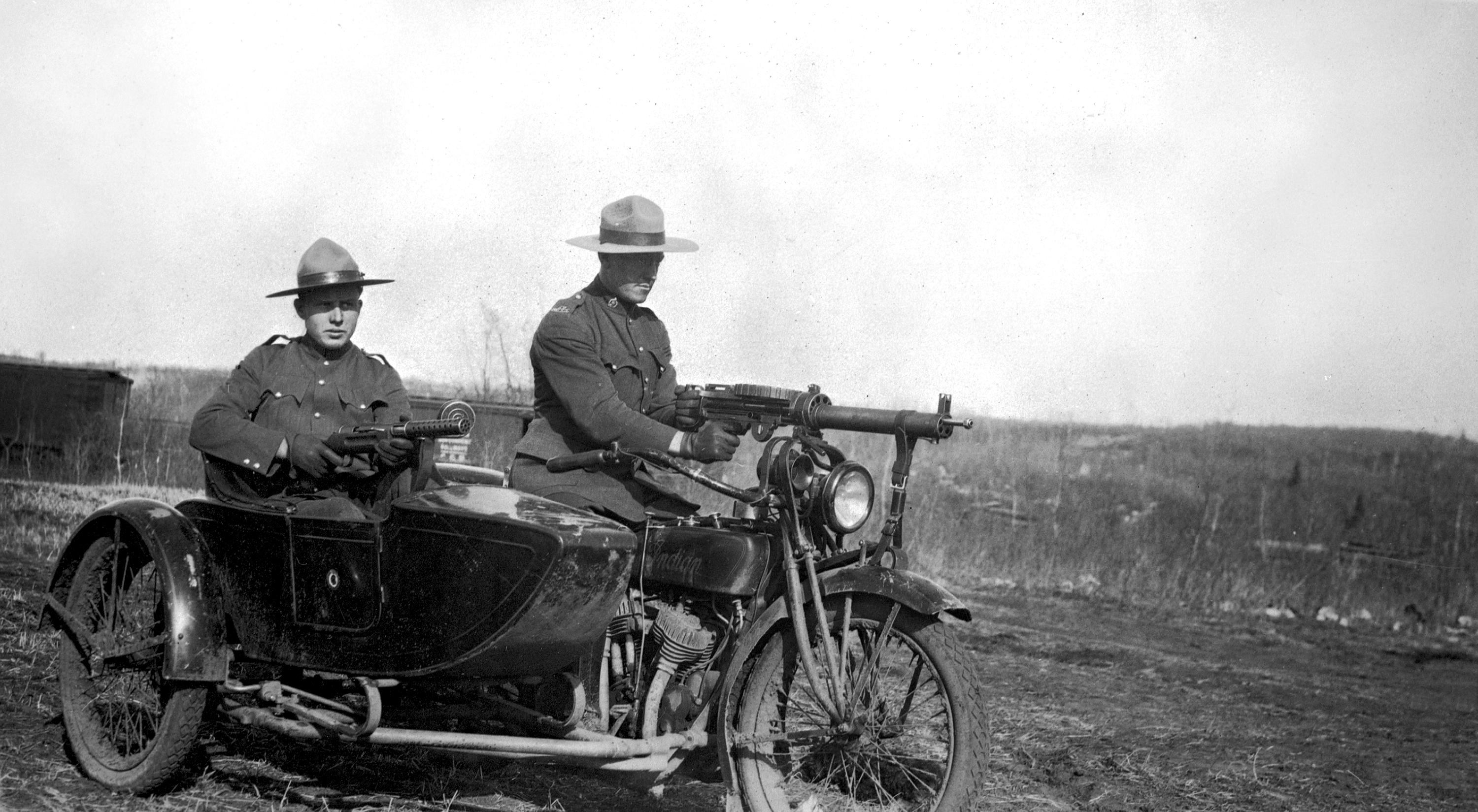
Alberta Provincial Police Indian Motocycle and sidecar near Drumheller

Premier Arthur Sifton announced the new Alberta Provincial Police under the authority of a three-person Board of Commissioners. Sifton hoped leaving the police force at arm's length from the Legislature would reduce politicization through an intermediary. The Board of Commissioners was created on February 2, 1917, via Order in Council with Deputy Attorney General Arthur George Browning, Police Magistrate for the City of Calgary Gilbert Edward Sanders, and Police Magistrate for the City of Edmonton and former Mountie Philip Primrose as the Commissioner. The Board had the authority to set general policies, guidelines and in association with newly appointed Superintendent Major A.E.C. McConnell, oversee the hiring and dismissal of personnel.

The newly formed APP was provided a few horses and Ford Model T's, and was primarily composed of former RNWMP officers, with 85% of members previously being employed as Mounties. Despite efforts to depoliticize the new police force, the provincial government was excited about the prospect of the APP, in particular enforcing the Liquor Control Act and prohibition, which RNWMP Commissioner Perry was happy to ignore. Additional restrictions to liquor control came in 1918 when the federal government outlawed importation of liquor containing more than 2.5% alcohol content into Canada, while just across the Canada–United States border, the state of Montana remained wet. Rum runners began operating across the Canada–United States border infamously through Whiskey Gap, the British Columbia border, and the Saskatchewan border, using equipment superior to the APP's vehicles. While the rum runners had the upper hand during the early parts of prohibition, the APP grew sophisticated to handle the growing activity, especially after 1919 when the United States passed prohibition through the Eighteenth Amendment.

The APP's duties expanded quickly as the police force was viewed as a tool for facilitating provincial policy, which was well beyond the scope of basic policing. The expanded responsibilities included transporting sick and isolated homesteaders to the hospital, administering the estate of institutionalized persons, administering the Mother's Pension Act which provided funds to widowed or deserted women to feed their children, inspected poolrooms, cafes, cattle, and as a debt collection service.

The APP were not an early success, the costs to the provincial treasury for operating a police force quickly rose from the $75,000 annually under the RNWMP to an average of nearly half a million dollars between 1918 and 1922, which represented about 5% of the provincial government's total annual revenue. Attrition was high for the new force, which saw 66 of the original 216 members resign in the first year of operations, and another 14 were dismissed by the service. Major McDonnell resigned by year end, leaving a depleted force of 139 men for the new Superintendent Willoughby Charles Bryan.

=== Conviction rates ===
Among the APP's strengths during its time was the force's conviction rate, which averaged 80% throughout its history. In particular the Calgary Division had significant success in 1930, with 2,492 convictions on 2,954 arrests, good enough for an 89.9% conviction rate. Among the 10% which were not convicted included individuals who were wanted outside of Alberta or Canada and handed over.

=== End of the Alberta Provincial Police ===
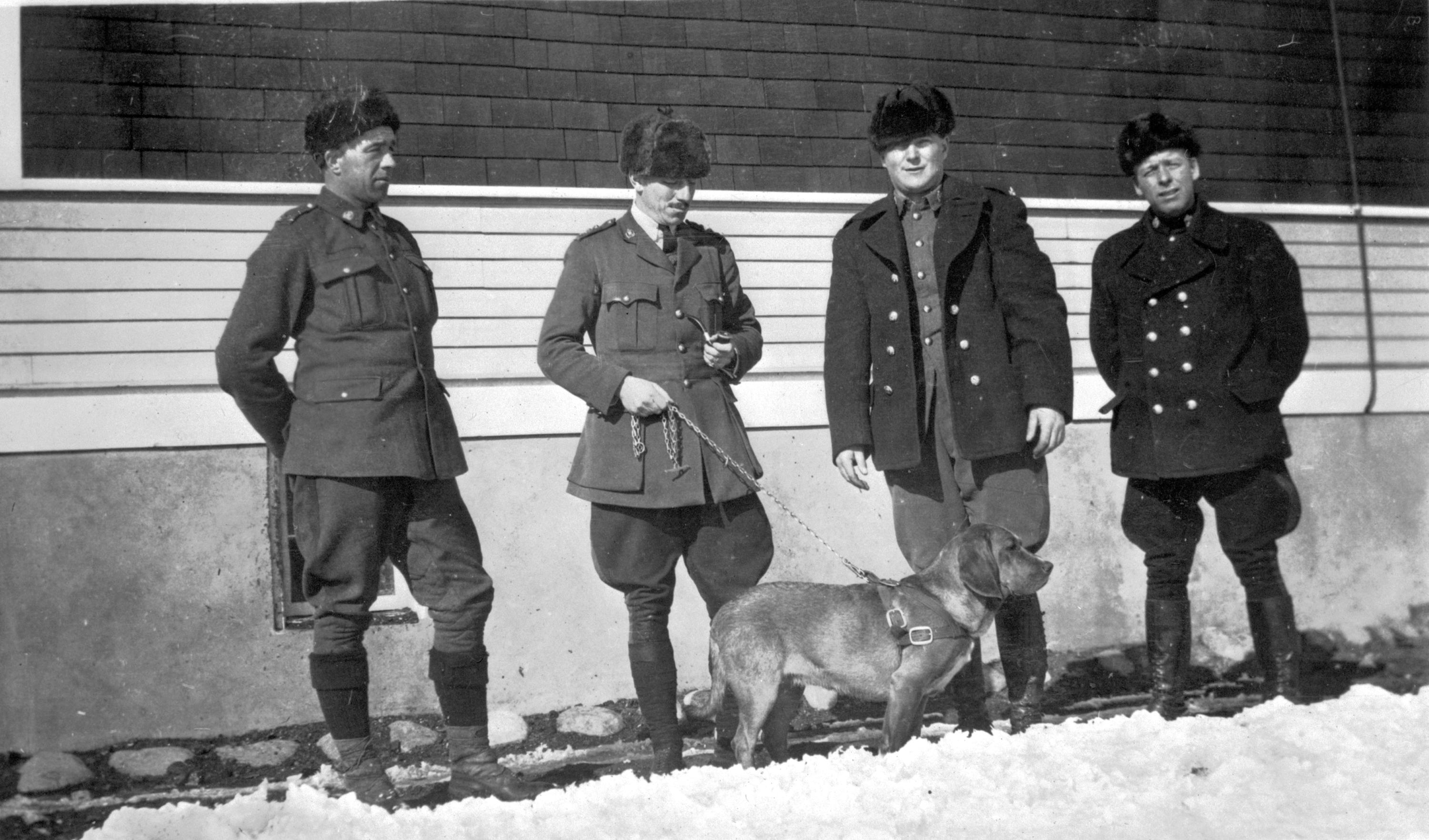
Alberta Provincial Police Members of the Peace River Detachment

Across the Fourth Meridian the government of Saskatchewan was evaluating the future of the Saskatchewan Provincial Police (SPP) which was founded alongside the APP during the First World War. The Saskatchewan government led by Liberal Premier James Garfield Gardiner sought to save money, reduce duplication of services and improve the reputation of the SPP. He approached the Mackenzie King government through Minister of Justice Ernest Lapointe in 1926 and provided three options, the RCMP take over the SPP duties; the SPP take over the RCMP duties; or the SPP take over RCMP duties outside of the border and remove northern areas. RCMP Commissioner Cortlandt Starnes recognized the threat two of the options had to the future expansion of the RCMP, and personally viewed the provincial police as inferior to the RCMP and highly susceptible to political influence. Starnes prepared a secret briefing for Lapointe which persuasively argued for the RCMP to take over provincial policing responsibilities in Saskatchewan. While disinterested in the RCMP and the situation in Saskatchewan, Prime Minister King advised Lapointe to resolve the matter to Premier Gardiner's satisfaction, and following a quick round of negotiations the SPP was disbanded by the end of 1928.

The Alberta government was facing significant financial challenges as the province entered the 1930s, and the economics of maintaining a provincial police force was a difficult proposition for the United Farmers government under Premier John Edward Brownlee. The earliest calls for dissolution of the force came from Conservative party leader David Milwyn Duggan in 1930, arguing the savings disbanding the force would provide; this was refuted by Attorney General John F. Lymburn. Meanwhile, in the winter of 1930–1931, Brownlee had reached out to the Saskatchewan Attorney General Murdoch Alexander MacPherson inquiring about the province's satisfaction with the performance of the RCMP, enforcement of provincial law including liquor, and employment of former SPP officers within the RCMP. MacPherson's responses to Brownlee were a positive indictment of the operation of the RCMP.

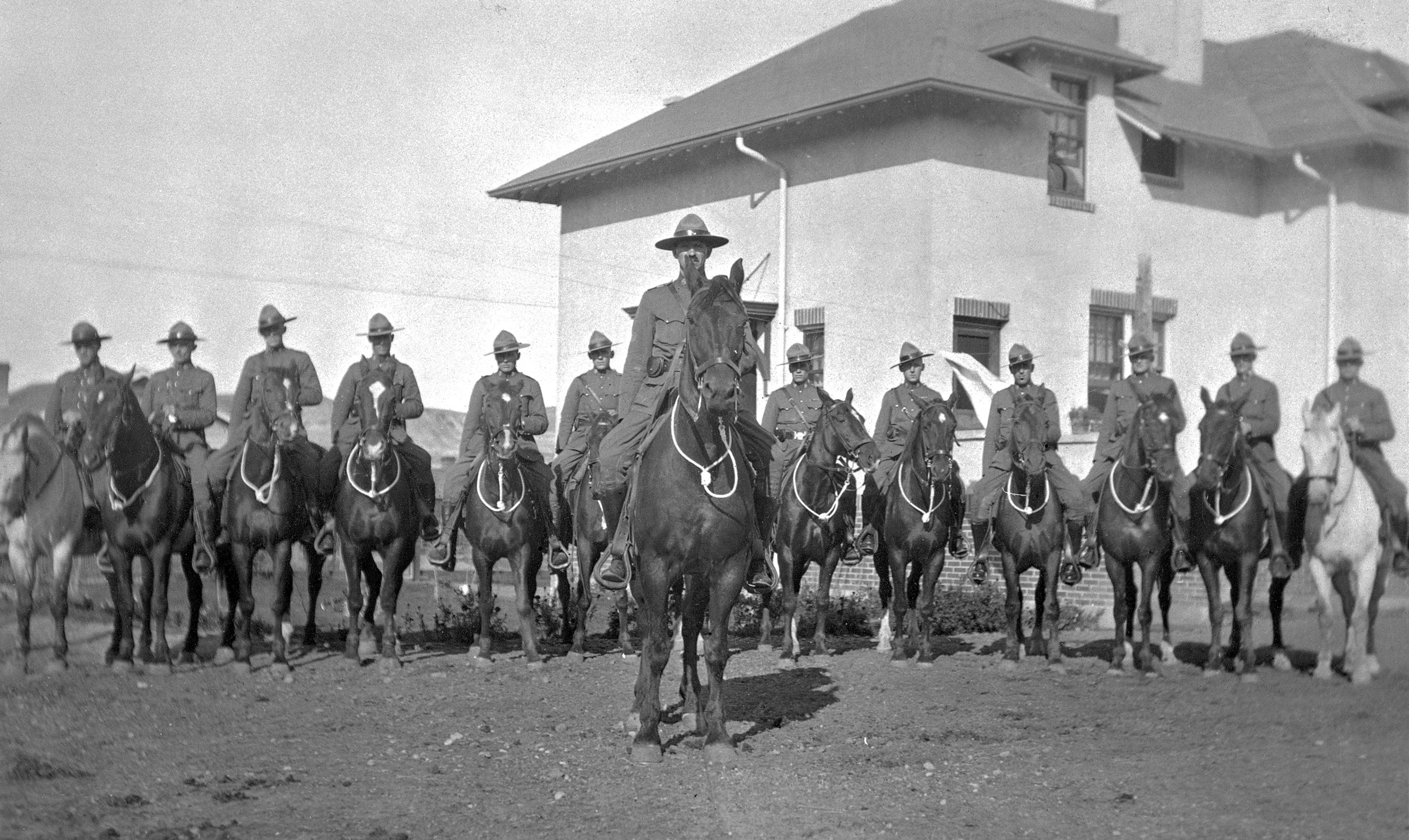
Alberta Provincial Police on horseback near Drumheller

The 1930 Canadian federal election saw Mackenzie King's Liberal government removed from power, and Conservative Calgarian R. B. Bennett took over as Canada's eleventh Prime Minister. Bennett appointed General James Howden MacBrien as Commissioner of the RCMP and enthusiastically supported the idea of a single, nation-wide law enforcement agency, which would provide efficiencies through economies of scale over fractured provincial police forces. Bennett had publicly opposed the RNWMP withdrawal of the prairie provinces in 1917 as a member of Prime Minister Borden's caucus, and saw the RCMP as an opportunity to assert federal control over policing, particularly around the issue of the union movement and left-wing political parties. Brownlee recognizing the opportunity and facing significant financial pressures approached Commissioner MacBrien on December 3, 1931, seeking a new federal contract. The Bennett government in 1931–1932 provided good terms to Alberta, Manitoba, New Brunswick, Nova Scotia, and Prince Edward Island for policing services, which enticed the provinces to support the RCMP's jurisdictional growth. Alberta was provided a contract which required the province to pay $225,000 in the first year, and $250,000 for the next four years in return for the services of 200–225 RCMP, which was half of the cost of maintaining the APP.

The APP suffered another blow with the resignation of long time Commissioner W. C. Bryan on October 1, 1931, reportedly due to health concerns. Originally appointed Commissioner in 1922, Bryan worked tirelessly to improve the quality and reputation of the APP. His resignation was a signal that the APP's days were numbered. Albertans and the provincial government were concerned about the potential loss of the APP, which had gained the admiration and trust of the province. However, supports of the APP were unable to muster significant opposition to the new federal contract, owing to the speed in which it was negotiated and the secrecy involving the details of the contract.

On February 25, 1932, Justice Minister Lymburn introduced into the 7th Alberta Legislature the An Act to ratify a certain Agreement between the Government of the Dominion of Canada and the Government of the Province of Alberta for Policing the Province (Bill 42) and An Act to Amend the Provincial Police Act, 1928 (Bill 43) which would wind down the operations of the APP. Bill 42 ratifying the agreement passed on March 7, 1932, by a vote of 50–7, while Bill 43 was passed two weeks later on March 21, 1932. Finally, on April 1, 1932, the RCMP began policing operations in Alberta. The change was bittersweet for many Albertans, with the Calgary-based newspaper The Albertan publishing a fond goodbye to the force on April 1.

They had built up a reputation for law enforcement unsurpassed by any force in the world. They had gained the respect of the citizens of Alberta as fair men and they had followed the hard and dangerous path of duty without fail.

— The Albertan April 1, 1932.

The RCMP proved to be a more economical policing solution for Alberta, with the province reducing the costs of policing on the provincial treasury by almost 50%, while receiving a disproportionate number of RCMP officers. In 1933, 350 men were stationed in Alberta, representing 14.5% of the RCMP manpower, yet Alberta's contract required the province to only contribute 3.6% of the RCMP's budget.

== Continued interest in provincial policing ==
Calls for Alberta to establish a provincial police force grew into the 21st century along with prosperity from record energy prices during the early 2000s. Increasing Western alienation coupled with perceived hostile federal governments in the late-1990s and early-2000s made greater control over policing, taxation and other matters palatable to Albertans. The 2001 Alberta Agenda (often called the "Firewall Letter") was an open letter authored by future Conservative Prime Minister Stephen Harper and six other prominent conservative Albertans addressed to Premier Ralph Klein that called for the provincial government to assert control and exercise Constitutional powers to provide Alberta with more autonomy. Among the suggestions in the letter was the cancellation of the provincial RCMP contract and establishment of a new provincial police force. While the Firewall Letter dominated the headlines, it came at an inopportune time for Premier Klein, only three months before the 2001 Alberta general election. Klein delayed an official response to the recommendations, publicly refuted some of the proposals in a response one month later, and subsequently led the Progressive Conservative Association of Alberta to a commanding victory, taking 62% of the vote and forming his third majority government. However, Klein appointed nine MLAs to the Committee on Strengthening Alberta's Role in Confederation, which recommended against a number of the policy points in the letter, yet called for a study of the RCMP to evaluate if an alternative could be operationally and financially viable. This study was never completed, and in 2011 Klein's successor, Ed Stelmach, signed a 20-year provincial policing contract with the RCMP.

Provincial control of policing entered the forefront of Alberta politics again following the election of the United Conservative Party in the 2019 Alberta general election. Premier Jason Kenney appointed six prominent Albertans and three MLAs to form the Fair Deal Panel, which was mandated to listen to Albertans and their ideas for Alberta's future. The panel's mandate included a number of policy topics to evaluate and publicly consult on, including establishing a provincial police force by ending the Alberta Police Service Agreement with the Government of Canada. The Fair Deal Panel delivered its final report in May 2020 and recommended the province re-establish the APP to replace the RCMP. The report noted Albertans would benefit from a stable police presence in rural communities, and the agility provided to redistribute police resources without the approval of the federal government. Under the federal-provincial agreement, the Alberta government pays $262.4-million for RCMP service, with the Government of Canada contributing $112.4-million, which is approximately 30% of the total cost of policing in the province.

Prior to the start of the 2023 Alberta general election, Premier Danielle Smith said that she would not campaign on the previous United Conservative promise to replace the RCMP with a provincial police force. However, she said that the issue would be revisited if the United Conservatives were re-elected.

== Ranks ==
Known ranks on the force:

- Commissioner
- Superintendent
- Assistant Superintendent
- Inspector
- Detective
- Sergeant
- Constable

== Commissioners ==
=== Board of Commissioners ===
- Philip Carteret Hill Primrose – Chairman (1917–1919) – Police Magistrate for the city of Edmonton and previously with the North-West Mounted Police
- Arthur George Browning KC (1917–1919) – Deputy Attorney General
- Gilbert Edward Sanders CMG, DSO (1917–1919) – Police Magistrate for the city of Calgary and previously with the North-West Mounted Police; served in World War I with rank of lieutenant-colonel

=== After re-organisation ===
- Alfred Cuddy 1919–1922 – former Chief of Calgary Police (1912–1919) and Assistant Commissioner of the Ontario Provincial Police
- Willoughby Charles Bryan 1922–1932 – previously with the North-West Mounted Police.

== Stations and divisions ==
Alberta Provincial Police stations were known as barracks or detachments with about 100 when the force was created in 1917.

The province was divided into division regions: Edmonton, Red Deer, Calgary, Lethbridge, Peace River, and Grande Prairie.

== Equipment and vehicles ==
=== Land fleet ===
- Indian Motorcycles with sidecars

=== Weapons ===
- Smith & Wesson Model 10
- Winchester Model 1876 saddle carbine—issued in .45-75 Winchester
- Lewis guns mounted on motorcycles
- MP18 sub-machineguns

== Officers killed in the line of duty ==
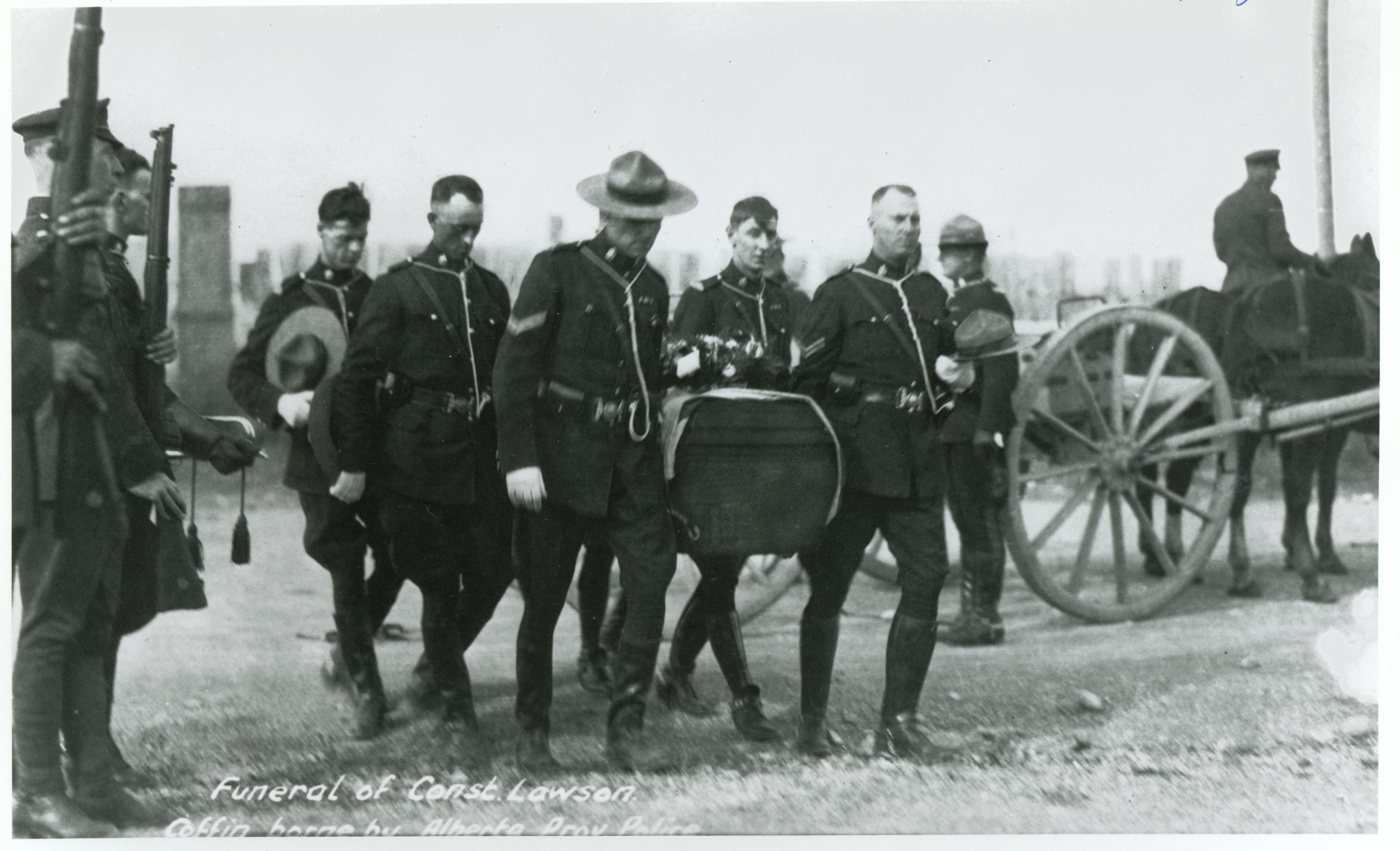
Funeral for Constable Stephen O. Lawson in 1922

- Constable Frank Sissons (Unknown – September 8, 1921) – shot in accident while inspecting living conditions of a family.
- Constable Oleson (Unknown – 1922) – injured seriously while enforcing order on a strikers' picketline at Cardiff, Alberta, died later in hospital.
- Constable George Osgoode (Unknown – January 25, 1922) – shot by bootlegger at Kinuso.

=== Constable Fred W.E. Bailey ===
Constable Fred W.E. Bailey (September 23, 1889 – August 7, 1920) and Special Constable Nick Kyslik (Unknown – August 8, 1920) were killed attempting to apprehend suspects involved in the Canadian Pacific Railway Train 63 robbery at Sentinel on August 2, 1920. George Arkoff, Alex Auloff and Tom Bassoff robbed passengers of $400 in cash and a collection of valuable items and escaped into the woods. Auloff headed to the United States alone while Arkoff and Bassoff stayed in the area and were seen entering the Bellevue Café on August 7. APP Constables Fred Bailey and James Frewin along with RCMP Corporal Usher planned to arrest the pair at the café. A shootout ensued where reports indicate Bailey and Usher were killed by Basoff, and Frewin shot and killed Arkoff. Deputized civilian Nick Kyslik was killed the next day investigating a cabin in the area. Bassoff was captured in a shed near the Pincher Creek train station on August 11. He was found guilty of murder and hanged on December 22, 1920.

=== Constable Stephen O. Lawson ===
Constable Stephen O. Lawson (June 8, 1880 – September 21, 1922) was stationed out of the Coleman detachment in Crowsnest Pass, which was a hub for the liquor smuggling into Alberta during prohibition. A common strategy for bootleggers was to run two vehicles, a "dummy" car which had no alcohol in it which would be stopped by the police, and a second vehicle which would race by the distracted officers minutes later. In September 1922 Lawson shot at a fleeing rum-runner which failed to stop at the checkpoint, injuring Steve Picariello, the son of prominent Blairmore bootlegger Emilio Picariello. On September 21, 1922, Emilio Picariello, Florence Lassandro and possibly another shooter confronted and killed Constable Lawson in front of the APP station in Coleman. Both Emilio Picariello and Florence Lassandro were found guilty and hanged on May 2, 1923. The APP barracks which was the scene of the crime is now a Provincial Historic Resource and an interpretive centre open to the public.

== See also ==
- Alberta Sheriffs Branch
- British Columbia Provincial Police
- Nova Scotia Police
- Saskatchewan Provincial Police

== Bibliography ==
- Foster, Franklin L. (1981). John E. Brownlee: A Biography. Lloydminster, Alberta: Foster Learning Inc. p. 202. ISBN 978-1-55220-004-9.
- Fryer, Harold (1977). Alberta, the pioneer years. Langley, British Columbia: Stagecoach Publishing Co. Ltd. ISBN 9780889830127. OCLC 651982480.
- Horrall, Stanley W. (1973). The Pictorial History of the Royal Canadian Mounted Police. Toronto, Canada: McGraw-Hill Ryerson. ISBN 9780070773660.
- Legislative Assembly of Alberta (1932). "7th Legislative Assembly, 2nd Session". Journals of the Legislative Assembly of Alberta. XXIX.
- Macleod, R. C. (1976). The North-West Mounted Police and Law Enforcement, 1873–1905. Toronto, Canada and Buffalo, US: University of Toronto Press. ISBN 0802053335.
- Moir, Sean (1992). The Alberta Provincial Police, 1917-1932. Edmonton, Alberta: University of Alberta. doi:10.7939/R33J3995M.
- Wilson, Fay (2016). "Booze, Temperance, and Soldiers on the Home Front: The Unraveling of the Image of the Idealised Soldier in Canada". Canadian Military History. 25 (1): 1–36. ISSN 1929-400X.
