= Nadon =

Nadon is a surname found mostly in Canada.

== People ==
- Alex Nadon, Canadian Lighting designer
- Guy Nadon (born in 1952), French-Canadian actor
- Joseph-Célestin Nadon (1899-1953), Canadian politician
- Marc Nadon (born in 1949), Canadian judge
- Maurice Nadon (1920-2009), Canadian Royal Canadian Mounted Police commissioners

== See also ==
- Amélie Goulet-Nadon (born in 1983), Canadian short track speed skating
- Arnaud Gascon-Nadon (born in 1988), Canadian football defensive lineman
- RCMP vessel Nadon, vessel of the Royal Canadian Mounted Police's Marine Division
