= William J. S. Elliott =

Canadian lawyer and civil servant

William Elliott COM KC

22nd Commissioner of the Royal Canadian Mounted Police
- In office July 16, 2007 – November 20, 2011
- Preceded by: Beverley Busson (interim)
- Succeeded by: Bob Paulson

Personal details
- Born: William John Shannon Elliott
- Spouse: Carolyn
- Children: 4
- Education: University of Ottawa
- Occupation: Lawyer; civil servant

William John Shannon Elliott COM KC is a Canadian lawyer and civil servant who served as the 22nd commissioner of the Royal Canadian Mounted Police (RCMP) from July 2007 to November 2011. He held a number of roles in the Government of Canada, including as the national security advisor to the prime minister, associate deputy minister of Public Safety Canada and deputy commissioner of the Canadian Coast Guard. Elliott was the RCMP's first civilian commissioner.

== Early life ==
Elliott received a Bachelor of Arts in 1976 and a Bachelor's degree in Common Law in 1979, both from the University of Ottawa. He was called to the Bar of Ontario in 1981 and remains a member of the Law Society of Upper Canada as a non-practicing lawyer.

== Career ==
Elliott started his professional career in 1981 as a lawyer in a private law practice. In 1988, he left private practice to join the Deputy Prime Minister of Canada's office as a Legal Advisor and Special Assistant, then as executive assistant in 1989. Elliott was promoted in 1990 to Chief of Staff to Deputy Prime Minister Don Mazankowski in the Mulroney government, a position he held until 1992.

=== Department of Justice Canada ===
In 1992, Elliott joined the Public Service of Canada as Senior Counsel/Manager, Comprehensive Claims and Northern Affairs for the Department of Justice; he was based at the Department of Indian Affairs and Northern Development Legal Services Unit. In 1994, he was promoted to Senior General Counsel and Head of Legal Services, Indian Affairs and Northern Development.

=== Canadian Coast Guard ===
In 1998, Elliott was appointed Deputy Commissioner of the Canadian Coast Guard and held the authority of an Assistant Deputy Minister.

=== Transport Canada ===
From 2000 to 2003, Elliott was appointed Assistant Deputy Minister, Safety and Security, at Transport Canada. The Safety and Security Branch of Transport Canada is responsible for the development and enforcement of regulations and national standards, as well as for the implementation of monitoring, testing, and inspections, which contribute to safety and security in the aviation, marine, rail and road modes of transport.

=== Privy Council Office ===
Elliott was appointed Assistant Secretary to the Cabinet in 2003, responsible for the Security and Intelligence Secretariat of the Privy Council Office. The secretariat provides support and secretariat services to the Cabinet Committee for Foreign Affairs and Security (formerly the Cabinet Committee on Security, Public Health and Emergencies), in addition to the Advisory Council on National Security who provides confidential expert advice to the Government through the National Security Advisor on issues related to national security.

In his role, Elliott supported the National Security Advisor and, as Assistant Secretary, was responsible for the support and secretariat services provided to Cabinet Committees and Ministers of the Crown. In April 2005, Elliott was appointed by Prime Minister Paul Martin as National Security Advisor.

=== Public Safety Canada ===
On May 1, 2006, Prime Minister Stephen Harper appointed Elliott as Associate Deputy Minister of Public Safety Canada, alongside Suzanne Hurtubise, Deputy Minister of Public Safety. In his role, Elliott assumed responsibility for several key branches within the department, including the Policing, Law Enforcement and Interoperability Branch, and the Emergency Management and National Security Branch.

=== Royal Canadian Mounted Police ===
Elliott was announced as the 22nd commissioner of the Royal Canadian Mounted Police on 6 July 2007 by Prime Minister Stephen Harper, making him the first commissioner that had not previously served in the police or military. He formally assumed command on July 16, 2007.

His appointment came after the resignation of Giuliano Zaccardelli, who left the force rocked by scandal and in crisis. Reaction to Elliott's appointment was mixed. Public perceptions are that the force's problems are rooted in its institutional culture and many felt that someone from outside the Canadian policing milieu and "free of loyalties" was necessary to effect necessary change. Many on the force, however, believe that one of their own, someone "who understands the force's unique culture and structure was needed to clean up the organization."

On 4 February 2011, the Harper government's PMO announced that Elliott would step down as commissioner in the summer of 2011. In the event, he hung on until late November 2011, one month after releasing his report into the Mayerthorpe shootings, and placing squarely on the plate of the next commissioner the C8 carbine rollout.

As a civilian appointment, Elliott never wore the RCMP uniform during his time as Commissioner, except on a trip to Afghanistan, where he wore the uniform shirt with his rank on the shoulders, and also a Smith and Wesson model 5946 9 mm pistol on his hip. He was provided the most basic of training in order to maintain the safety of others but did not meet the standard an RCMP cadet would have to meet. A large number of members believed this was a contradiction of his own words that he would not wear a uniform he did not earn.

=== INTERPOL ===
On August 18, 2011, the Secretary General of INTERPOL, Ronald K. Noble, announced that Elliott would be appointed to a three-year term as Special Representative of INTERPOL to the United Nations, effective November 21, 2011. He previously served as a Delegate for the Americas with INTERPOL's executive committee.

Elliott's responsibilities included working to facilitate and enhance co-operation between INTERPOL and the United Nations and its agencies on matters of terrorism, transnational organized crime and international police cooperation. As head of INTERPOL's UN office, the Special Representative of INTERPOL to the United Nations assists both organizations to develop key INTERPOL-UN partnerships to combat international crime and works with senior officials at the UN to identify resource-sharing opportunities.

== Honours ==
=== Order of Merit of the Police Forces ===
The Order of Merit of the Police Forces honours a career of exceptional service or distinctive merit displayed by the men and women of the Canadian Police Services, and recognizes their commitment to this country. The primary focus is on exceptional merit, contributions to policing and community development. As Commissioner of the RCMP, Elliott holds the Commission of Principal Commander of the Order of Merit of the Police Forces. Upon leaving the RCMP, Elliott will continue to be a Commander of the Order.

=== The Most Venerable Order of the Hospital of St. John of Jerusalem ===
The Most Venerable Order of the Hospital of St. John of Jerusalem has been a Canadian national honour since 1990, recognizing charitably minded men and women whose philanthropy is expressed principally through its two foundations, the St. John Eye Hospital in Jerusalem and St. John Ambulance. Elliott was installed an Officer of the Order of St. John in 2008.

=== Queen's Counsel ===
In 1992, Elliott was commissioned a Queen's Counsel (or King's Counsel during the reign of a male sovereign), a lawyer appointed by letters patent to be one of "Her [or His] Majesty's Counsel learned in the law". While Ontario has ceased appointments to the rank of Queen's Counsel, membership continues to exist in various provinces within Canada and Commonwealth countries around the world. Privileges of membership include sitting within the Bar of court.

=== Queen Elizabeth II Golden Jubilee Medal (2002) ===
The Queen Elizabeth II Golden Jubilee Medal was created in 2002 to commemorate the 50th anniversary of the ascension of Her Majesty Queen Elizabeth II to the throne. The Medal was awarded to Canadians who have made outstanding and exemplary contributions to their communities or to Canada as a whole. Elliott was awarded the Golden Jubilee Medal in 2002.

== Notes and references ==
=== References ===
- Prime Minister's Office (2005). News Release: Prime Minister announces the appointment of his National Security Advisor. Retrieved July 8, 2005.
- Transport Canada (2000). "The New Assistant Deputy Minister – Safety and Security", Newsletter Fall 2000. Retrieved July 8, 2005.
- Prime Minister's Office (2006). News Release: Prime Minister announces changes in the senior ranks of the Public Service. Retrieved April 29, 2006.
