= William O. Smith =

William O. Smith may refer to:

- William Orlando Smith (1859–1932), U.S. Representative from the state of Pennsylvania
- William Osborne Smith (1833–1887), first Acting Commissioner of the North West Mounted Police
- William Owen Smith (1848–1929), lawyer in Hawaii
- Bill Smith (jazz musician) (William Overton Smith, born 1926)

== See also ==
- William Smith (disambiguation)
