= Cortlandt Starnes =

Cortlandt Starnes (March 31, 1864 – May 28, 1934) was the 7th Commissioner of the Royal Canadian Mounted Police, from April 1, 1923, to July 31, 1931.

He died in St. Hilaire, Quebec, on May 28, 1934, and is buried in Cote des Neiges Cemetery, Montreal.

Police appointments
Preceded by Aylesworth Perry	Commissioner of the Royal Canadian Mounted Police; 1923-1931	Succeeded by James Howden MacBrien
