= Norman Inkster =

18th commissioner of the RCMP

Norman Inkster OC

President of Interpol
- In office 1992–1994
- Preceded by: Ivan Barbot
- Succeeded by: Björn Eriksson

18th Commissioner of the Royal Canadian Mounted Police
- In office September 1, 1987 – June 24, 1994
- Preceded by: Robert Simmonds
- Succeeded by: Philip Murray

Personal details
- Born: Norman David Inkster; August 19, 1938 (age 88) Winnipeg, Manitoba, Canada
- Spouses: Mary-Anne Morrison (m. 1961, divorced) Pamela Jeffery (m. 2008)
- Children: 3 (including Dana)
- Education: University of New Brunswick
- Awards: Order of Canada (1995); Gusi Peace Prize (2011)

Norman David Inkster OC (born August 19, 1938) is a retired police officer who served as 18th commissioner of the Royal Canadian Mounted Police (RCMP) from 1987 to 1994. From 1992 until 1994, he also served as president of Interpol.

== Early life and career ==
Norman David Inkster was born on August 19, 1938, in Winnipeg, but grew up in Broadview, Saskatchewan. His father, Harold, was a master mechanic with the Canadian Pacific Railway and his mother, Martha, was a housewife. He was educated at the University of New Brunswick, where he studied sociology and psychology.

During his studies he was continuously employed in the Human Resources department of the RCMP. In 1961, he married Mary-Anne Morrison. They raised three children together: Leslie Anne (1965), Scott (1967) and Dana (1972).

== Later life and career ==
From 1994 to 2003, he was a partner with KPMG in Toronto, the latter part of which he was global managing partner of the forensic practice. In 1995 he was made an Officer of the Order of Canada. In 2003, he retired from KPMG and started Inkster Group. He was president of the Inkster Group, which provides various security and policing services to a list of international clients, including the Province of Ontario. In 2006, Inkster Group was acquired by Navigant Consulting where Inkster served as a managing director. In 2007, Inkster became an independent consultant. He was engaged to marry Pamela Jeffery, founder of the Women's Executive Network in 2008. They later were married in of October in a service in Toronto with friends and family. He was awarded the Gusi Peace Prize in 2011.

Police appointments
Preceded by Robert Simmonds	Commissioner of the Royal Canadian Mounted Police; 1987–1994	Succeeded by Philip Murray
