= Lawrence Herchmer =

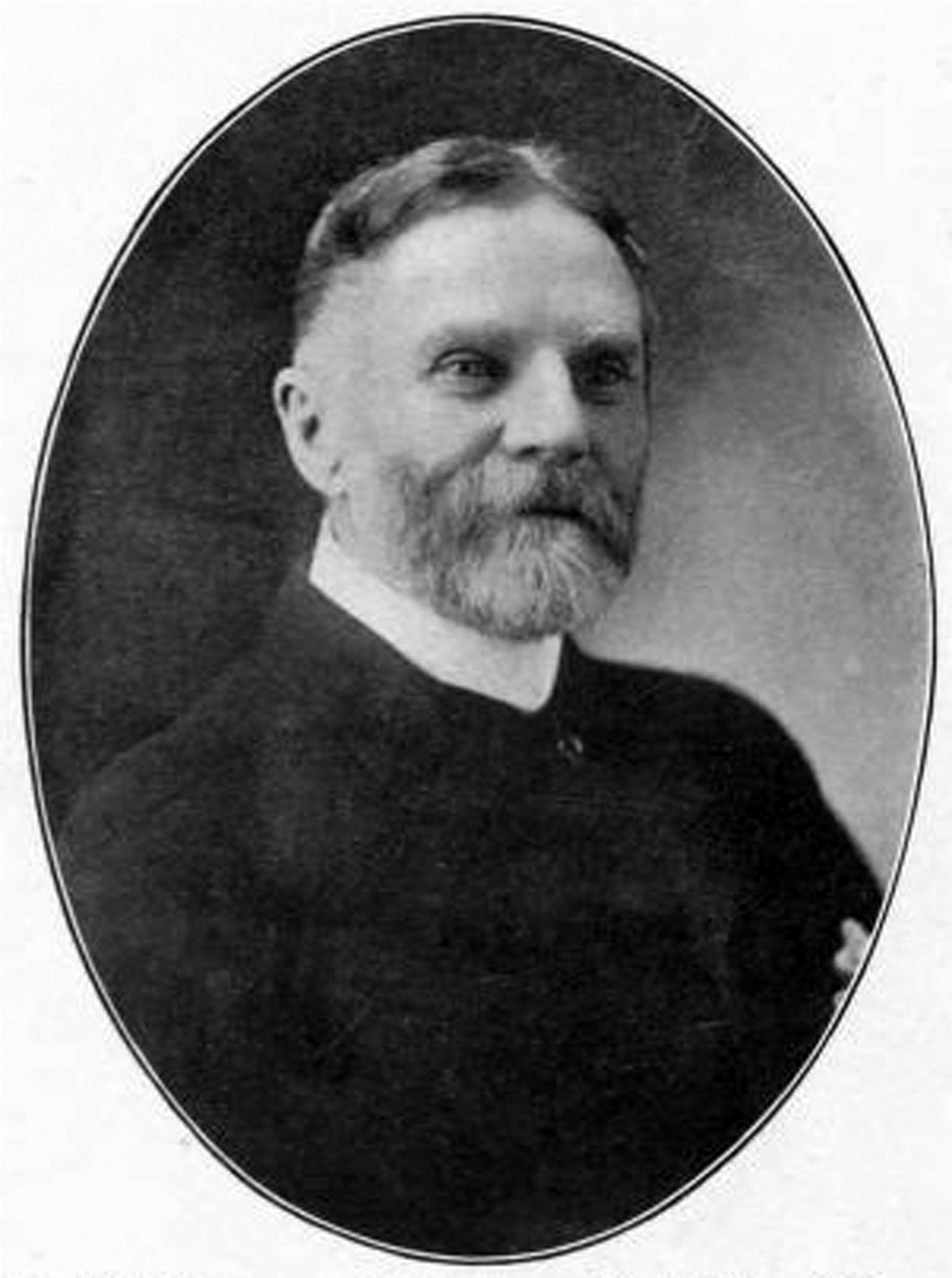

Lawrence William Herchmer (25 April 1840 – 17 February 1915) was a Canadian and British police commander and army officer, who was also employed as a farmer, brewer and civil servant. He served as the fifth Commissioner of the North-West Mounted Police, from April 1, 1886 to July 31, 1900.

Born in Shipton-on-Cherwell, England, Herchmer served with the British Army and, during 1872–4, as supply officer of the British Boundary Commission, then as Indian agent in Manitoba in 1876. He was named RCMP Commissioner in 1886.

Although a former military officer, he had not served in the police, and was a civilian at the time he was named as Commissioner of the force.

Herchmer was "a capable administrator", but being hot-tempered and overbearing, he gained a "reputation as a tyrant" during his tenure as commissioner. Nevertheless, the force under his command gained better benefits, living conditions, organization, and training, and more respect, with a marked improvement in esprit du corps. His personality earned him a number of political enemies, leading to charges of mismanagement that produced a judicial inquiry in 1892 (which cleared him) and culminated in his dismissal in 1900, while he was serving with the Canadian Army in South Africa. Herchmer considered his firing unjust, and continued to say so until his death.

Herchmer introduced the wide-brimmed hats (later adopted as official uniform), and the famous musical ride display of horsemanship.

His family had connections with John A. Macdonald, first prime minister of Canada, who appointed him. He had the political backing to make many important changes to the administration and organization of the force.

He died in Vancouver, British Columbia at 74.

Police appointments
Preceded by Acheson Irvine	Commissioner of the North-West Mounted Police; 1886-1900	Succeeded by Aylesworth Perry
