= James Macleod =

Canadian judge and politician (1836–1894)

James Farquharson Macleod
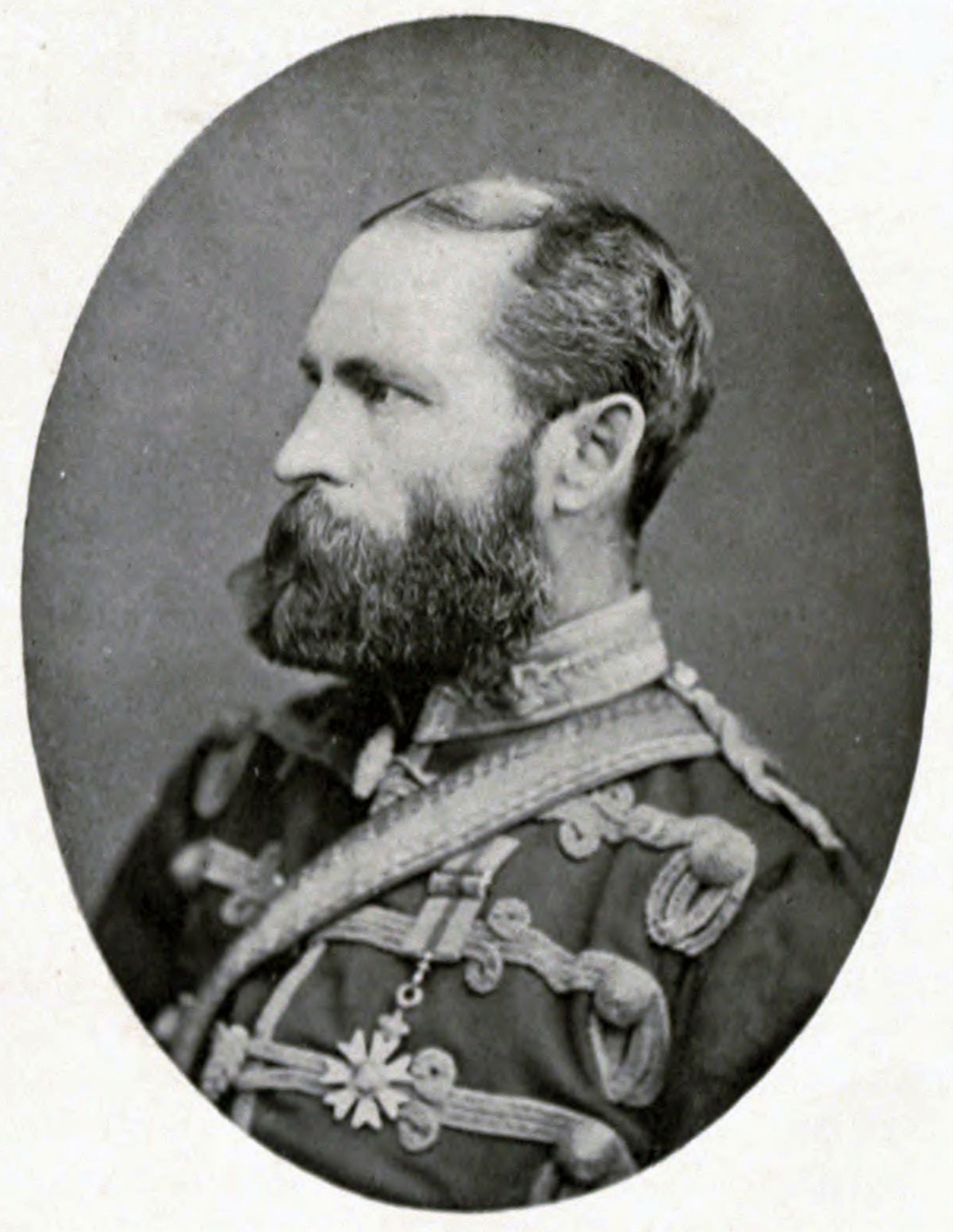
- Born: September 25, 1836; Drynoch, Isle of Skye, Scotland
- Died: September 5, 1894 (aged 57)
- Burial place: Union Cemetery, Calgary
- Spouse: Mary Isabella Drever (m. 1876)
- Military career
- Branch: Canadian Militia; North-West Mounted Police
- Service years: 1856-1873 (Canadian Militia); 1873-1880 (NWMP)
- Rank: Lieutenant Colonel (Canadian Militia); Commissioner (NWMP)
- Units: Volunteer Militia Field Battery of Kingston; Bowmanville Rifle Company; 45th West Durham Battalion of Infantry; NWMP
- Commands: 45th West Durham Battalion of Infantry; NWMP
- Conflicts: Fenian Raids; Red River Rebellion

Lieutenant-Colonel James Farquharson Macleod (c. September 25, 1836 – September 5, 1894), born in Drynoch, Isle of Skye, Scotland, was a militia officer, lawyer, North-West Mounted Police officer, magistrate, judge, and politician in Alberta. He served as the second full Commissioner of the North-West Mounted Police, from July 22, 1876, to October 31, 1880. Fort Macleod, Macleod Trail, a major Calgary, Alberta thoroughfare, are named after him and Colonel MacLeod Elementary school in Calgary.

In 1887, Macleod was appointed to the Supreme Court of the Northwest Territories, which then included what is now known as Alberta and Saskatchewan. He held this position until his death in 1894. He is buried in Union Cemetery in Calgary.

== Education ==
Macleod immigrated with his family from Scotland in 1845, when his father purchased a farm at Richmond Hill, Ontario. Macleod attended Upper Canada College in Toronto, Ontario and then Queen's University in Kingston, Ontario. He graduated in 1854 from Queen's with a B.A. in classics and philosophy and then enrolled in 1856 at Osgoode Hall to attend law school. He graduated with an LL.B. in 1860 and articled with the law office of Alexander Campbell. It was also sometime around this time that he joined the Orange Order, L.O.L. 141, as was common of Canadian Ulster-Scots at the time.

Before law school during the summer of 1856, against the wishes of his parents, Macleod joined the Volunteer Militia Field Battery of Kingston as a lieutenant and his enthusiasm was such that his brother-in-law William Augustus Baldwin persuaded Governor General Sir Edmund Walker Head to offer Macleod a commission in the British army. His father insisted that the offer be refused.

== Military service ==
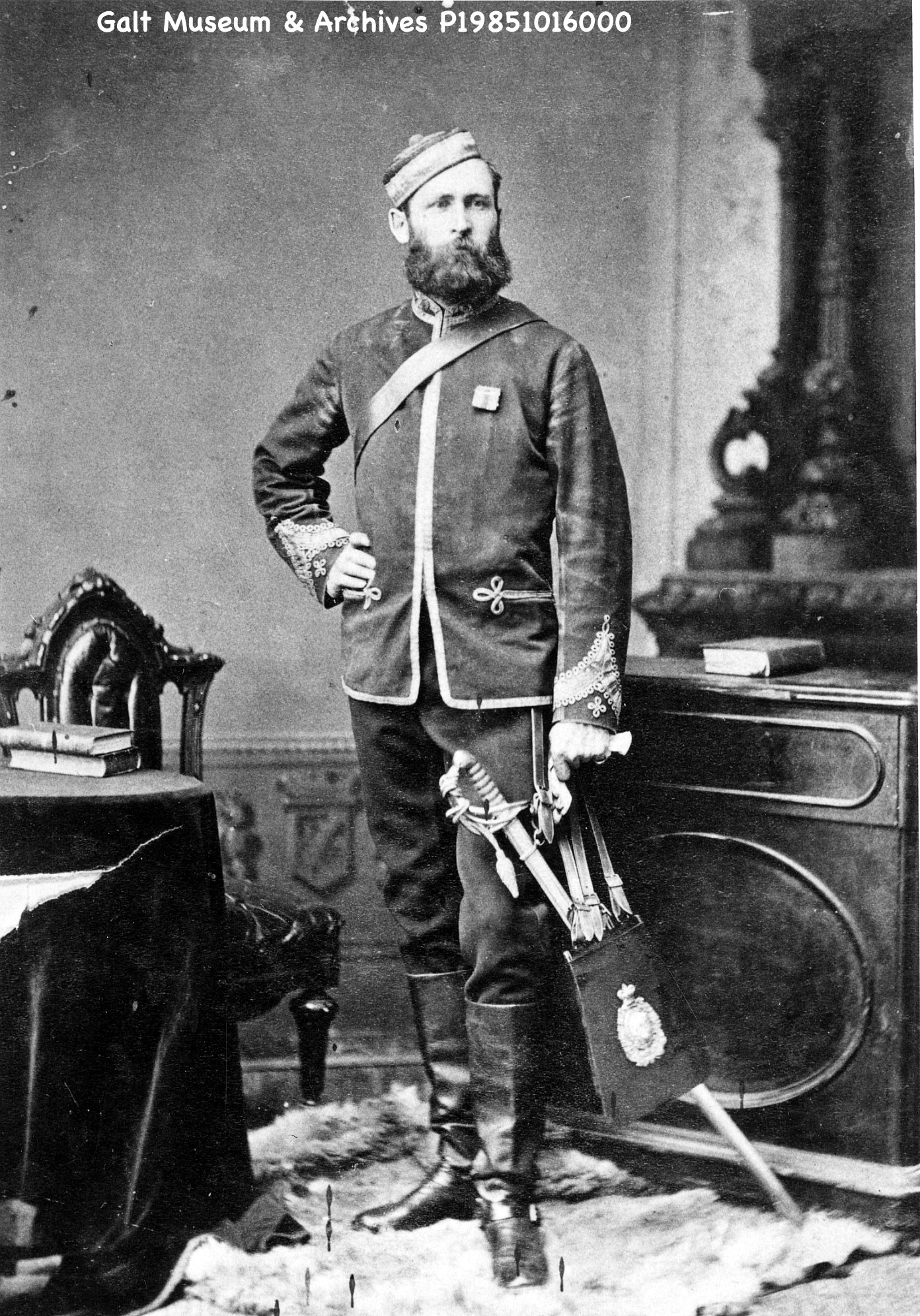
Macleod in 1875

From 1860 to 1870 Macleod practiced law in Bowmanville, Ontario, but during that time he retained an interest in the militia. He transferred in 1862 to the Bowmanville Volunteer Militia Rifle Company and was promoted to captain in 1863 and major in 1866 when the Bowmanville company became part of the newly formed 45th West Durham Battalion of Infantry. Active service during the Trent Affair in 1861 and the Fenian Raids of 1866 confirmed his interest in the military.

In 1870, he obtained a commission as brigade major with the Wolseley expedition which was sent to quell the Red River Rebellion. After returning from the Red River in 1871, Macleod was promoted to Lieutenant Colonel and became the commanding officer of the 45th West Durham Battalion.

== North-West Mounted Police ==
Macleod served as Commissioner of the NWMP from 1876 to 1880.

== Northwest Territories Legislature ==
Macleod was appointed to the 1st Council of the North-West Territories on October 7, 1876, to serve as one of the body's earliest members.

He served as a regular appointed member until 1881, when he was appointed as a Stipendiary Magistrate. He served as such until the 1st Northwest Territories general election.

In 1888, he was reappointed to the Assembly as one of three Legal Advisors, a non-voting at-large position created to help the assembly make the transition to an elected body. The position was abolished when the legislature was dissolved at the time of the 1891 election. That ended Macleod's 15 years of service with the NWT government.

== Personal life ==
On July 28, 1876, Macleod married pioneer Mary Isabella Drever, who he first met in Spring 1871. They settled in Fort Macleod and had four daughters and one son.

Police appointments
Preceded by George Arthur French	Commissioner of the North-West Mounted Police; 1876-1880	Succeeded by Acheson Irvine
Political offices
Preceded by New Position	MLA Appointed Member; 1876-1881	Succeeded by Acheson Irvine
Preceded by New Position	MLA Stipendiary Magistrate; 1881-1888	Succeeded by Position Abolished
Preceded by New Position	MLA Legal Advisor; 1888-1891	Succeeded by Position Abolished
