= William Osborne Smith =

Canadian politician

Lieutenant-Colonel William Osborne Smith
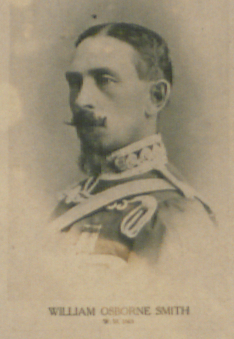

1st Commissioner of the North-West Mounted Police
- In office 15 September – 17 October 1873
- Preceded by: Office established
- Succeeded by: George Arthur French

Personal details
- Born: 1833 Wales, UK
- Died: 11 May 1887 (aged 53–54) Swansea, Wales, UK

Military service
- Allegiance: United Kingdom; Dominion of Canada
- Branch/service: British Army; Canadian Militia
- Rank: Lieutenant (UK); Lieutenant-colonel (Canada)
- Unit: 39th (Dorsetshire) Regiment of Foot; 3rd Battalion, The Victoria Volunteer Rifles of Montreal
- Commands: 91st Winnipeg Battalion of Light Infantry
- Battles/wars: Crimean War; Fenian Raids; North-West Rebellion

Lieutenant-Colonel William Osborne Smith (1833 – 11 May 1887) was the first Acting Commissioner of the North-West Mounted Police, from 25 September to 17 October 1873.

== Biography ==
Osborne Smith was born to W. H. Smith of Hendreowen (West Glamorgan), Wales. He was commissioned into the British Army's 39th Foot in 1855. He served in the Crimea and came to the province of Canada with his regiment in 1856. He married Janet Colquhoun of Montreal in 1858. When his unit was transferred to Bermuda in 1859, Osborne Smith, then a lieutenant, sold his commission and became a merchant in Montreal. He later became a lieutenant-colonel in the Canadian Militia.

Osborne Smith carries the distinction of having the only regimental number that carries a fraction. His number was 2.5.

He returned to Wales and died in Swansea in 1887.

== Legacy ==
A neighbourhood in Winnipeg is named after Osborne. The Osborne Village is part of the federal riding of Winnipeg South Centre and a major area of cultural influence, including the gay village.
