= Clifford Harvison =

Canadian police commissioner (1902–1968)

Clifford Walter Harvison (March 26, 1902 – February 12, 1968) served as the 12th commissioner of the Royal Canadian Mounted Police, from April 1, 1960 to October 31, 1963.

He began his policing career with the then Royal North-West Mounted Police in 1919 to 1923 and again from 1932 to 1963 with the RCMP after a brief stint at the Better Business Bureau in Montreal.

Police appointments
Preceded by Charles Rivett-Carnac	Commissioner of the Royal Canadian Mounted Police; 1960-1963	Succeeded by George McClellan
