= Joseph Philip Robert Murray =

19th commissioner of the RCMP

Philip Murray

19th Commissioner of the Royal Canadian Mounted Police
- In office June 25, 1994 – August 31, 2000
- Preceded by: Norman Inkster
- Succeeded by: Giuliano Zaccardelli

Personal details
- Born: Joseph Philip Robert Murray; March 6, 1943 (age 83) Ottawa, Ontario, Canada
- Education: University of Regina (BBA)

Joseph Philip Robert Murray (born March 6, 1943) is a Canadian retired police officer who served as the 19th commissioner of the Royal Canadian Mounted Police (RCMP) from 1994 to 2000.

== Early years ==
Murray was born in Ottawa, Ontario, and joined the RCMP in 1962. He spent his early career in Saskatchewan.

He attended the University of Regina, where he was awarded the General Proficiency Scholarship in both 1975 and 1976, a Bachelor of Business Administration degree in 1977 and a Certificate in Business Administration in 1978.

== Rising in the ranks ==
Murray became an Inspector in 1979, then joined the A Division in Ottawa. He was made Superintendent in charge of VIP Security and Airport Security in 1986.

He then became Chief Superintendent and Assistant Commissioner in 1988 and finally Deputy Commissioner in the early 1990s before becoming Commissioner in 1994.

== Commissioner of RCMP (1994–2000) ==
During his service as commissioner, Murray established town hall meetings to improve communication within the Force and initiated corporate sponsorship. In 1997 he ended the RCMP's responsibility for airport security, leaving it to local police establishments and private security agencies. He adopted Alternative Dispute Resolution and developed the Mission, Vision, and Values/Shared Leadership Statement which guides the force today.

Murray officially retired from the RCMP in 2000.

Police appointments
Preceded by Norman Inkster	Commissioner of the Royal Canadian Mounted Police; 1994–2000	Succeeded by Giuliano Zaccardelli
