= CCGS Simon Fraser =

History

Canada
- Name: Simon Fraser
- Namesake: Simon Fraser
- Owner: Government of Canada
- Operator: Department of Transport Canada; Canadian Coast Guard
- Port of registry: Ottawa, Ontario
- Builder: Burrard Dry Dock, North Vancouver
- Way number: 306
- Launched: 18 August 1959
- Commissioned: February 1960
- Decommissioned: March 2001
- Refit: 1986
- Identification: Official number: 313105; IMO number: 5328732; Call sign: CGSJ
- Fate: Sold 2006

General characteristics
- Type: Buoy tender
- Tonnage: 1,358 GRT
- Displacement: 1,876 long tons (1,906 t)
- Length: 62.4 m (204 ft 9 in)
- Beam: 12.8 m (42 ft 0 in)
- Draught: 4.2 m (13 ft 9 in)
- Installed power: 2,900 shp (2,200 kW)
- Propulsion: Diesel-electric
- Speed: 14 knots (26 km/h)
- Range: 5,000 nautical miles (9,300 km) at 10 knots (19 km/h)
- Endurance: 20 days
- Aircraft carried: 1 × helicopter
- Aviation facilities: Flight deck and hangar

CCGS Simon Fraser (Note: CCGS stands for Canadian Coast Guard Ship) was a buoy tender operated by the Canadian Coast Guard. The vessel entered service in 1960 with the Department of Transport's Marine Fleet, before being transferred to the newly formed Canadian Coast Guard in 1962. The buoy tender served on both coasts of Canada and was used for search and rescue duties along the West Coast of Canada. The ship was loaned to the Royal Canadian Mounted Police in 2000 and transited the Northwest Passage, circumnavigating North America in the process. The ship was taken out of service in 2001 and sold to private interests. In 2006, the vessel reappeared as a yacht using the same name.

== Design and description ==
Simon Fraser and sister ship Tupper were 62.4 m (204 ft 9 in) long overall with a beam of 12.8 m (42 ft 0 in) and a draught of 4.2 m (13 ft 9 in). The vessel had a fully loaded displacement of 1,876 long tons (1,906 t) and a gross register tonnage (GRT) of 1,358. The vessels were powered by a diesel-electric system (DC/DC) driving two fixed-pitch screws creating 2,900 shaft horsepower (2,200 kW). This gave the vessels a maximum speed of 14 knots (26 km/h). The ship carried 200.00 m^{3} (43,990 imp gal) of diesel fuel, had a range of 5,000 nautical miles (9,300 km) at 10 knots (19 km/h) and could stay at sea for up to 20 days. The ships were fitted with a flight deck and a telescopic hangar and were capable of operating one helicopter.

== Service history ==
The vessel was constructed by Burrard Dry Dock at their yard in Vancouver, British Columbia with the yard number 306. Simon Fraser was launched on 18 August 1959, named after a Scottish explorer who charted much of what became known as British Columbia. The ship entered service with the Department of Transport in February 1960. In 1962 the Department of Transport's Marine Service fleet was merged into the newly formed Canadian Coast Guard and Simon Fraser was given the new prefix CCGS. The vessel was registered in Ottawa, Ontario.

Simon Fraser was initially assigned to duties in the Western Region, working in the Pacific Ocean. In 1986, the vessel was converted for search and rescue duties and transferred to the Laurentian Region in Eastern Canada. Towards the end of her career, Simon Fraser returned to buoy tending duties in the Maritimes Region, based at Dartmouth, Nova Scotia. She played a role in searching for wreckage that could show the cause of the crash of Swissair Flight 111. In May 2000 Simon Fraser was loaned to a Royal Canadian Mounted Police (RCMP) support group. Travelling from Halifax, Nova Scotia to Vancouver, the vessel transited the Panama Canal. From there, the Coast Guard ship escorted the RCMP vessel Nadon on a transit of the Northwest Passage, which was recreating the historic 1940–1942 transit of RCMP St Roch. In doing so, Simon Fraser circumnavigated North America. This was Simon Fraser's last voyage prior to her decommissioning.

Simon Fraser was taken out of service in 2001 and renamed 2001–07. In 2006 she was sold to Quay Marine Associates Inc., reverted to her original name and registered in Livorno, Italy, where she was taken for conversion to a yacht and charter vessel.
