= RCMP vessel Nadon =

Patrol vessel

History

Canada
- Name: RCMP Nadon
- Namesake: Maurice Nadon
- Builder: Shore Boat Builders, Richmond
- Commissioned: 1991
- Out of service: 2016
- Renamed: St. Roch II, temporarily
- Home port: Ottawa
- Status: Still seaworthy

General characteristics
- Class & type: Commissioner-class patrol vessel
- Length: 17.7 m (58 ft 1 in)
- Propulsion: 2 × 820 hp (611 kW) MAN D2840 LE401 V10 diesel engines
- Speed: 36 knots (67 km/h; 41 mph)
- Crew: 4

RCMP Nadon is a Commissioner-class high-speed patrol vessel previously operated by the Royal Canadian Mounted Police's Marine Division. The vessel, designed by Robert Allan Ltd. and built by Shore Boat Builders, is an aluminium-hulled 17.7-metre (58 ft) planing catamaran, capable of speeds of up to 36 knots (67 km/h; 41 mph).

Nadon, named after Maurice Nadon, the RCMP Commissioner between 1974-1977, was stationed at Nanaimo, British Columbia, and responsible for patrolling the 300 nautical miles (560 km; 350 mi) of coastline between the United States border and the Mid Coast, north of Vancouver Island.

In 2000 Nadon was temporarily renamed St. Roch II in order to recreate the 1950 voyage of the RCMP schooner St. Roch around the North American continent. The voyage began at Vancouver on 1 July 2000, and involved navigating the Northwest Passage around the northern coast of Canada as far as Halifax. She was accompanied by the Coast Guard ship Simon Fraser, as a support vessel.

St. Roch II also carried out a search for a reported wreck from Sir John Franklin's expedition of 1845. Using a Kongsberg/Simrad SM2000 forward-looking sonar she completed a survey west of Grant Point on the Adelaide Peninsula. An area of 16 square nautical miles (55 km^{2}; 21 sq mi) of previously uncharted sea floor was searched, but found nothing, and a survey by shore parties of the unnamed island southwest of Grant Point, and the northwestern point of Grant Point itself found nothing definitive.

The St. Roch II then continued down the eastern seaboard of the U.S., across the Caribbean to transit the Panama Canal before returning to Vancouver in December. The voyage was a joint project of the RCMP and the Vancouver Marine Museum to raise funds to help maintain and preserve the original St. Roch.

Having reverted to her original name Nadon continued in service with the RCMP until its recent decommissioning.
