= Isaac Fraser =

Upper Canada politician

Isaac Fraser (September 19, 1779 – July 2, 1858) was a political figure in Upper Canada.

== Early years ==
He was born in Albany County, New York in 1779. He settled on a farm in Ernestown Township, served in the militia during the War of 1812 and became a colonel in the Addington Militia.

== Politics ==
He represented Lennox & Addington in the Legislative Assembly of Upper Canada from 1816 to 1820 and served as members of the Executive Council and Legislative Council of Upper Canada from 1839 to 1841. He was appointed as justice of the peace in the Midland District in 1818.

== Personal ==
His daughter Eleanor Fraser was the mother of Aylesworth Bowen Perry, Commissioner of the Northwest Mounted Police 1900 to 1920 and Commissioner of the Royal Canadian Mounted Police 1920 to 1923.
