= George McClellan (police officer) =

Canadian police commissioner

George Brinton McClellan Jr.
- Born: August 13, 1908; Moose Jaw, Saskatchewan
- Died: July 19, 1982 (aged 73) Edmonton, Alberta
- Allegiance: Canada
- Branch: Royal Canadian Mounted Police
- Rank: Commissioner
- Awards: CM, OBE, DFC, O.Ont, CD

George Brinton McClellan Jr. CM, OBE, DFC, OOnt, CD (August 13, 1908 – July 19, 1982) served as the 13th Commissioner of the Royal Canadian Mounted Police, from November 1, 1963, to August 14, 1967.

== Education ==
In 1929, he graduated from the Royal Military College of Canada in Kingston, Ontario, with a Certificate of Military Qualifications in Cavalry and Infantry.

== Career ==
He joined the Royal Canadian Mounted Police on August 15, 1932. He served across Canada in national security and criminal investigation.

He was appointed Commissioner of the RCMP on November 1, 1963. He chaired two federal-provincial conferences resulting in the expansion of National Police Services, and the Canadian Police College. He terminated equitation training for all recruits but maintained it for the Royal Canadian Mounted Police Musical Ride.

== Honours ==
He was decorated by the Norwegian government with the King Haakon VII Cross of Liberation For his work in training Nordic troops based in Canada during World War II. He was decorated with the St John Ambulance Medal, the 1953 Coronation Medal, the RCMP Long Service Medal with Gold Clasp and the Canadian Centennial Medal. In 1978 he received an Honorary Doctor of Laws from the University of Alberta.

After his retirement from August 14, 1967 – 1974, he served as the first Ombudsman in Canada, serving the Province of Alberta. From 1976 to 1978, he was Chairman of the Rent Regulation Appeal Board of Alberta. He became Chairman of the Alberta Press Council in 1978. He died on July 19, 1982, in Edmonton, Alberta.

== Family ==
He was born to George Brinton McClellan Sr. and Elizabeth Ann Cunnington in 1908 in Saskatchewan. George McClellan Jr. married Bertha Elizabeth Austin in 1941; they had 3 daughters.

== Camp X ==
George McClellan was a key figure involved in Camp X.

Police appointments
Preceded by Clifford Harvison	Commissioner of the Royal Canadian Mounted Police; 1963-1967	Succeeded by Malcolm Lindsay
