= Mary Isabella Macleod =

North American pioneer

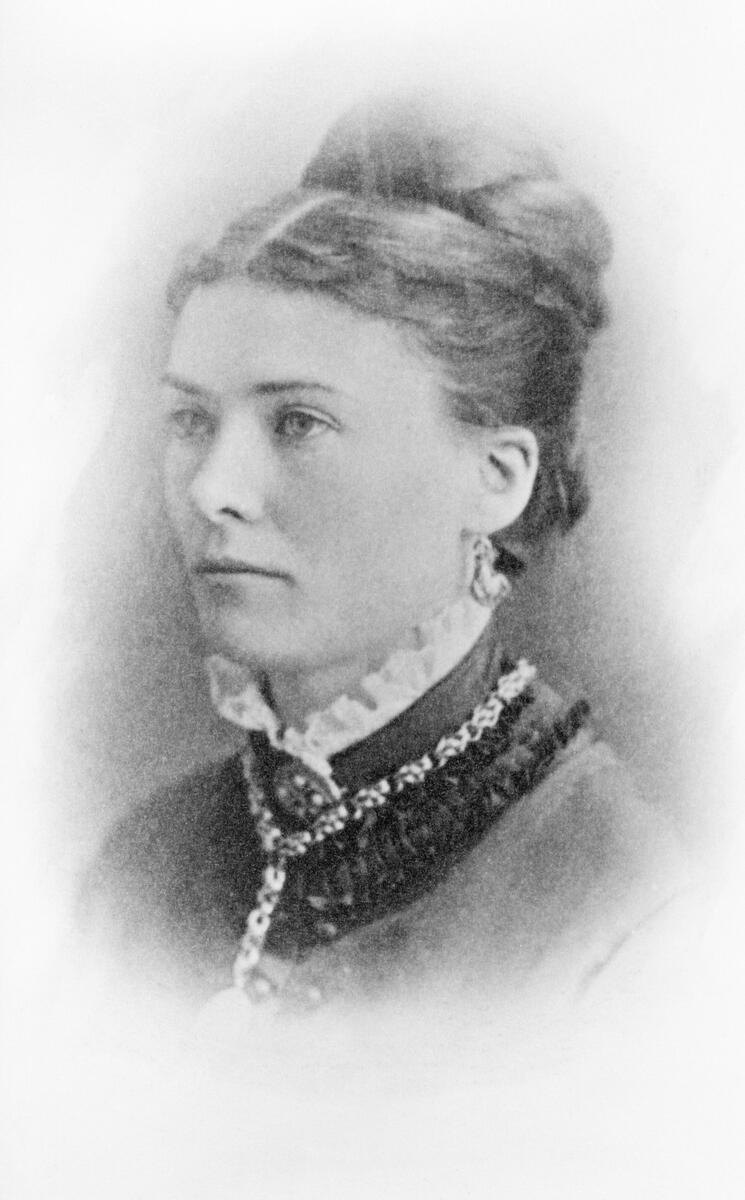
- Mary Macleod, 1880
- Born: Mary Isabella Drever; October 11, 1852; Red River
- Died: April 15, 1933 (aged 80); Calgary, Alberta, Canada
- Spouse: James Macleod (m. 1876; died 1894)
- Children: 5

Mary Isabella Macleod (October 11, 1852 – April 15, 1933) was a North American pioneer. At the age of 17, she became notable for evading detection by Métis guards, which allowed her to deliver an important military dispatch addressed to Field marshal Garnet Wolseley during the Red River Rebellion in 1869. Macleod was also one of six white women and one of several women to sign Treaty 7 in Blackfoot Crossing in September 1877.

On July 28, 1876, Mary married Lieutenant colonel James Macleod, whom she first met in the spring of 1871. They settled in Fort Macleod and had four daughters and one son. Macleod died on September 5, 1894, in Calgary, Alberta.

Mary often accompanied James Macleod during his inspections and tours of duty as a commissioner of the North-West Mounted Police (NWMP). Mary was universally admired by NWMP officers and their wives.
