= Bev Busson =

Canadian Senator

The Honourable Beverley Busson CM COM OBC

Canadian Senator from British Columbia
- In office September 24, 2018 – August 23, 2026
- Nominated by: Justin Trudeau
- Appointed by: Julie Payette

21st Commissioner of the Royal Canadian Mounted Police
- Interim
- In office December 16, 2006 – June 14, 2007
- Preceded by: Giuliano Zaccardelli
- Succeeded by: William Elliott

Personal details
- Born: Beverley Ann MacDonald; August 23, 1951 (age 75) Halifax, Nova Scotia, Canada
- Party: Independent Senators Group
- Education: University of British Columbia
- Occupation: Police officer
- Known for: First female commissioner of the Royal Canadian Mounted Police

Beverley Ann Busson CM COM OBC (née MacDonald; born August 23, 1951) is a Canadian Senator and former police officer who served as the 21st commissioner of the Royal Canadian Mounted Police (RCMP) from December 2006 to June 2007. She was the first woman to hold this position and was appointed on an interim basis in the wake of Giuliano Zaccardelli's resignation amid controversy. Busson's subsequent appointment as a member of the Senate of Canada representing British Columbia was announced on September 24, 2018.

== Early life and police career ==
Busson was born as Beverley Ann MacDonald on August 23, 1951, in Halifax, Nova Scotia. She joined the Royal Canadian Mounted Police in 1974 after graduating with an education degree. She would later earn a law degree from the University of British Columbia.

Rising up the ranks, Busson has worked for the RCMP in Salmon Arm, Vancouver, Ottawa and North Battleford, Saskatchewan (Assistant Commissioner and Commanding Officer in Saskatchewan). Prior to her appointment she was Deputy Commissioner for the Pacific Region (2000–2006) and took a leave from the force to head British Columbia's Organized Crime Agency (1999–2000).

== Senate of Canada ==
During debate on use of the Emergencies Act, in relation to the Freedom Convoy protests in Ottawa, Busson stated in Senate that Ottawa had become an "amusement park for anarchists." She urged the Act be kept in place, noting encampments near Ottawa, "so these people do not again overwhelm the people who are trying to protect us;" Prime Minister Justin Trudeau stopped use of the Act later that day.

== Awards ==
OBC ribbon

In 2004, she was made a Commander of the Order of Merit of the Police Forces. In 2006, she was made a Member of the Order of British Columbia.

On June 17, 2010, she was awarded the Doctor of Laws honorary degree by Simon Fraser University in Burnaby, British Columbia.
