= Robert Simmonds =

Canadian police officer (1926–2023)

Robert Simmonds OC CStJ

17th Commissioner of the Royal Canadian Mounted Police
- In office September 1, 1977 – August 31, 1987
- Preceded by: Maurice Nadon
- Succeeded by: Norman Inkster

Personal details
- Born: Robert Henry Simmonds; April 6, 1926 Keatley, Saskatchewan, Canada
- Died: January 17, 2023 (aged 96) Ottawa, Ontario, Canada
- Profession: Police officer
- Awards: RCMP Long Service Medal (1967); Order of St. John (1978); Order of Canada (1987)

Robert Henry Simmonds OC (April 6, 1926 – January 17, 2023) was a Canadian police officer who served as the 17th commissioner of the Royal Canadian Mounted Police (RCMP) from 1977 to 1987.

== Early life and career ==
Robert Henry Simmonds was born on April 6, 1926, in Keatley near Hafford, Saskatchewan. Simmonds grew up on a farm and was educated in a one-room schoolhouse. He joined the Royal Navy Fleet Air Arm, served overseas during the last year of the Second World War.

== RCMP career ==
Simmonds joined the Royal Canadian Mounted Police on April 23, 1947, where he trained at “Depot” Division in Regina. The following year, while touring with the RCMP Musical Ride, he performed highway patrols in Edmonton. He was subsequently posted to “K” Division, serving Edmonton, Innisfail, Three Hills, Wetaskiwin, Hanna and Calgary.

In 1953, Simmonds was part of the Canadian Contingent during the Coronation of Queen Elizabeth II in England. In 1957, he moved to Calgary Subdivision as a Criminal Investigator. In 1966 he moved to Burnaby, British Columbia as Sub-Inspector, but transferred to Victoria in 1971 to work in the staffing and personnel department. Three years later, he was promoted to Superintendent and charged with commanding the Victoria Subdivision. In 1976, Simmonds was promoted from Chief Superintendent to Deputy Commissioner of Administration in Ottawa. On September 1, 1977, he was appointed Commissioner of the RCMP.

Simmonds was supportive of the organization of a British Columbia Police commission to mediate between police and the public. He felt that the RCMP should conduct themselves in an ethical manner and be accountable to the Government for their actions. In 1984, the RCMP Security Service was replaced by the Canadian Security Intelligence Service (CSIS). Throughout his term in office, Simmonds guided the Force through a time of heavy media scrutiny because of a series of sensational criminal investigations the Government was involved in at the time. He employed great discretion in speaking to the public and the media in order to avoid compromising the cases. Heavily active during his term as Commissioner, Simmonds was named Vice President of the International Criminal Police Organization (Interpol), as well as the Dominion of Canada Rifle Association.

== Post-RCMP career ==
After retiring in 1987, he negotiated peace between warring tribes in South Africa and became the senior law enforcement officer of the United Nations Fund for Drug Abuse Control (UNFDAC) in Vienna.

Simmonds died in Ottawa, Ontario on January 17, 2023, at the age of 96.

== Honours ==
Simmonds was awarded the RCMP Long Service Medal in 1967, accompanied by the bronze Clasp in 1972. He received the Queen Elizabeth II Silver Jubilee Medal in 1977, appointed Commander of the Order of St. John in 1978, and received the Queen Elizabeth II Diamond Jubilee Medal in 2012. He became an Honorary patron of the Parents’ Resource Institute for Drug Education (PRIDE), whose primary goal was the prevention and reduction of drug use among youth. In 1987, he was appointed an Officer of the Order of Canada.

Police appointments
Preceded by Maurice Nadon	Commissioner of the Royal Canadian Mounted Police; 1977–1987	Succeeded by Norman Inkster
