= Charles Rivett-Carnac =

Canadian police commissioner (1901–1980)

Commissioner of the Royal Canadian Mounted Police
- In office April 1, 1959 – March 31, 1960
- Preceded by: Leonard Nicholson
- Succeeded by: Clifford Harvison

Personal details
- Born: August 31, 1901 Eastbourne, Sussex, England
- Died: July 18, 1980 (aged 78)

Charles Edward Rivett-Carnac (August 31, 1901 – July 18, 1980) was a Commissioner of the Royal Canadian Mounted Police.

== Biography ==
=== Early life ===
A descendant of Sir James Rivett-Carnac, Rivett-Carnac, was born in Eastbourne, Sussex, England and soon after his birth, was taken by his father to Assam in India. He lived there until he returned to England at the age of six and spent his early childhood living with an aunt and uncle. He attended St Cyprian's School and when he was 14 went on to Eastbourne College as a boarder. A year later he was moved again to live with a different aunt in London, where he went to a local grammar school. Rivett-Carnac did not enjoy school, and during World War I loaned money off a friend to learn to drive so that he could join the British Red Cross as an ambulance driver. At the age of 16, he joined the French Ambulance Corps and served on the front line.

=== India ===
After the war, he joined his father, who was Deputy Inspector General of the Indian Imperial Police in India. Here Rivett-Carnac was in charge of the Assam Sawmills and Timber Company forest operations for the Tezpur area of India. Working in the elephant camps of the jungle took its toll on Rivett-Carnac, and he began to suffer from malaria. He soon left the jungle and worked as an assistant manager for the Bisra Stone Lime Company. A few months later, due to his poor health he was sent to work at the head office in Calcutta where medical facilities were more readily available.

=== Canada ===
In 1923 he emigrated to Canada with only thirty-five dollars in his pocket and joined the "Mounties" on July 25. He spent many years working in the North of Canada, and he steadily rose through the ranks to become the 11th Commissioner of the force, a post he held from April 1, 1959 to March 31, 1960. In 1945 while Rivett-Carnac was in charge of Intelligence at headquarters, he was heavily involved in the famous Igor Gouzenko case. He was also Vice-President of INTERPOL.

== Publications ==
- Pursuit in the Wilderness (1967).

Police appointments
Preceded by Leonard Nicholson	Commissioner of the Royal Canadian Mounted Police; 1959-1960	Succeeded by Clifford Harvison
