= Acheson Irvine =

Canadian politician

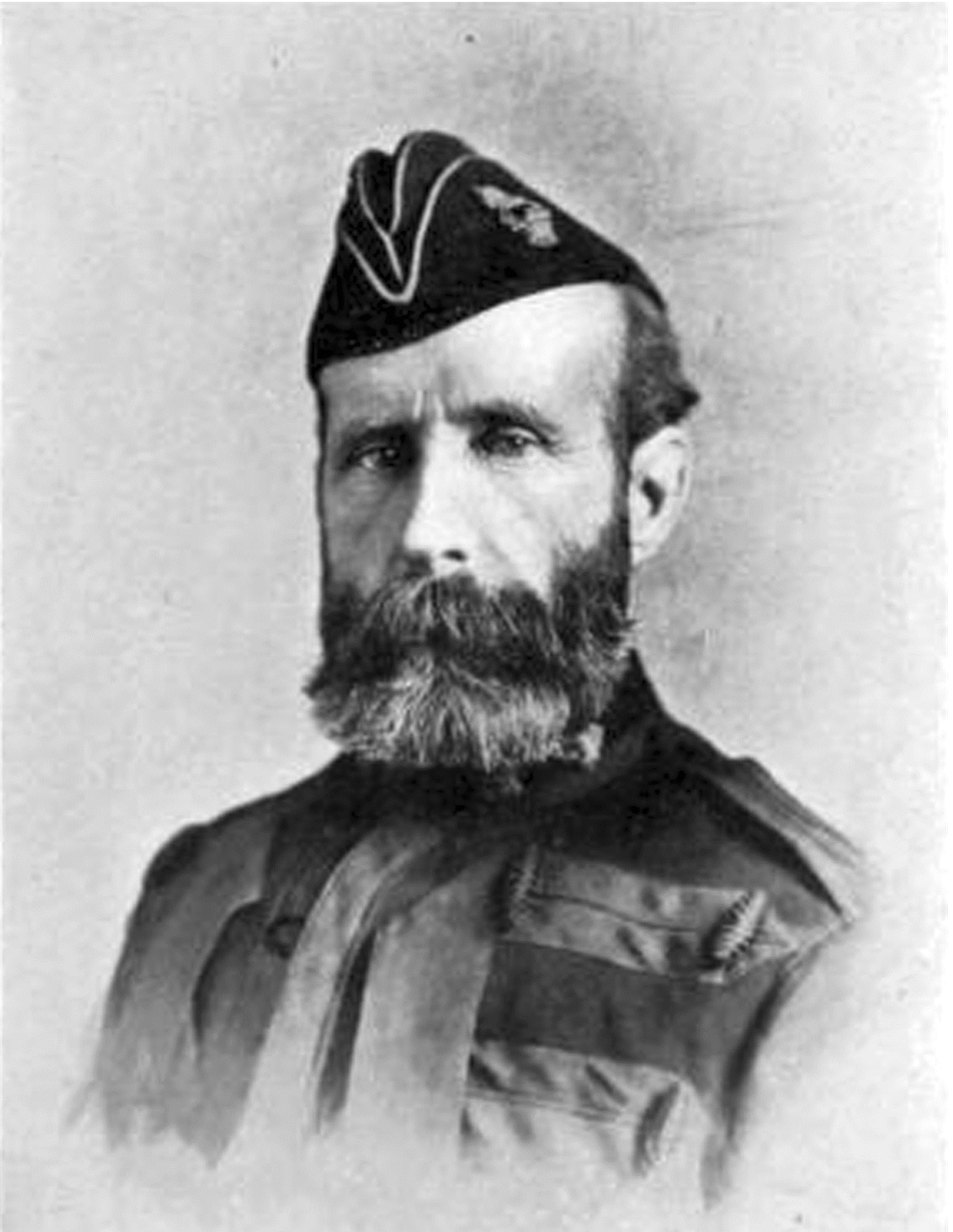

Commissioner of the Royal Canadian Mounted Police
- In office 1880–1886
- Preceded by: James Macleod
- Succeeded by: Lawrence Herchmer

Acheson Gosford Irvine, ISO (December 7, 1837 – January 8, 1916) served as Commissioner of the North-West Mounted Police (NWMP) from November 1, 1880, to March 31, 1886.

Irvine was born in Lower Canada in 1837, the son of John George Irvine, a captain in the Royal Quebec volunteers. Acheson became Assistant Commissioner of the North-West Mounted Police in 1876, and was promoted to commissioner in 1880.

Irvine was involved with the events of the North-West Rebellion of 1885. On March 17, 1885, Irvine received a telegraph from Superintendent Leif Crozier that there was trouble near Fort Carlton and reinforcements were required. On March 18, Irvine left Regina, Assiniboia, with 100 men, arriving in Prince Albert, Saskatchewan, on March 25. On March 26, Irvine set out for Fort Carlton with 83 police and 25 civilian volunteers. Shortly before his arrival there, a skirmish took place at Duck Lake, outside Batoche, between the existing NWMP forces, led by Crozier, and a group of Métis and Indians led by Gabriel Dumont, with the NWMP coming off worst. On March 27, the day after his arrival, Irvine concluded that Fort Carlton was indefensible and pulled the troops out, returning to Prince Albert. The troops returned to Prince Albert unharmed, but Fort Carlton burnt to the ground during the evacuation. Irvine was publicly censured by General Middleton for not attacking Batoche.

Acheson Irvine also served as a member of the executive council of the North-West Territories from 1882 to 1886. Following his retirement in 1886, he became warden of the Stony Mountain Penitentiary in Manitoba. He was awarded the Imperial Service Order in 1902.

In 1945, an RCMP Commissioner-Class ship was named after him. The patrol vessel Irvine (originally named HMCS Noranda) had started off life as a Bangor-class minesweeper in the Royal Canadian Navy. In 1962 the RCMP sold the ship, which was converted to a yacht, the Miriana; she sank at Montego Bay, Jamaica in May 1971.

Police appointments
Preceded by James MacLeod	Commissioner of the North-West Mounted Police; 1880-1886	Succeeded by Lawrence Herchmer
