= Maurice Nadon =

Canadian police commissioner

Maurice Jean Nadon (July 8, 1920 – December 21, 2009) was the 16th Commissioner of the Royal Canadian Mounted Police, serving from January 1, 1974 to August 31, 1977.

Nadon was born in Mattawa, Ontario, joined the RCMP in 1939 and retired from the force in 1977.

He was the first and only French Canadian commissioner of the RCMP.

In 1991 the RCMP commissioned RCMP vessel Nadon, a patrol boat named for the former Commissioner. In 2011, the new RCMP Headquarters (M. J. Nadon Government of Canada Building) in Ottawa was named in his honour.

Nadon died in 2009 in Pembroke, Ontario and was buried at Beechwood Cemetery in Ottawa. Predeceased by his wife Madeleine Desrosiers, Nadon was survived by son Robert and daughter Suzanne.

Police appointments
| Preceded by William Higgitt | Commissioner of the Royal Canadian Mounted Police; 1974-1977 | Succeeded by Robert Simmonds |
