= Dana Inkster =

Canadian artist and filmmaker

- Born: Ottawa, Ontario, Canada
- Known for: Filmmaker

Dana Inkster is a Canadian media artist and filmmaker.

== Biography ==
Inkster grew up in Ottawa, Ontario. She focused on political studies during her undergraduate education at Queen's University, and has a Graduate Diploma in Communications Studies from Concordia University. She currently lives and works in Lethbridge, Alberta where she lives with her partner and their son.

== Artistic career ==
Inkster's work often experiments with narrative while exploring the complexities of identify, which stem in part, from her experiences as a black, queer, feminist. Her first film, Welcome to Africville, was released in 1999. In 2008, her film 24 Days in Brooks, which documents a 2005 labour strike at Lakeside Packers, won an Alberta Motion Picture Industry Award for best production reflecting cultural diversity. The film examines the lives of recent immigrant workers drawn to Brooks by numerous entry-level, unskilled labour jobs.

Inkster has directed a television ad in a Canadian Race Relations Foundation anti-racism campaign.

She has won the best Canadian female film director prize from the Toronto Images Film Festival. The Art of Autobiography was awarded Best Short or Medium-length Documentary by the Association of Quebec Cinema Critics.

== Filmography ==
- Welcome to Africville (1999)
- The Art of Autobiography: Redux I (2001)
- 24 Days in Brooks (2007)
- The Writer's Room (in production) https://production.nfbonf.ca/en/project/please-welcome-ms-esi-edugyan/
