= Giuliano Zaccardelli =

20th commissioner of the RCMP

Giuliano Zaccardelli COM CStJ OMRI
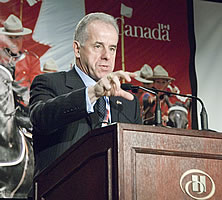
- Zaccardelli in 2006

20th Commissioner of the Royal Canadian Mounted Police
- In office 1 September 2000 – 15 December 2006
- Preceded by: Philip Murray
- Succeeded by: Beverley Busson (interim)

Personal details
- Born: 1946 or 1947 (age 79–80) Prezza, Abruzzo, Italy
- Awards: Legion of Honour – Officer (2003)

Giuliano Zaccardelli COM CStJ OMRI (born c. 1947) is an Italian-born Canadian retired police officer who served as the 20th commissioner of the Royal Canadian Mounted Police (RCMP) from 2000 to 2006. His departure from the RCMP was linked to the force's involvement in the Maher Arar affair. Zaccardelli was later impugned during inquiries into irregularities in the management of the RCMP's pension and insurance fund. He subsequently became a senior official with Interpol in Lyon, France, heading its OASIS Africa program, which aims to help African police forces more effectively combat international crime.

== Life and career ==
Zaccardelli was born in Prezza, Italy, and immigrated to Canada at age seven.

He joined the RCMP in 1970 and was posted to St. Paul, Alberta, following recruit training. He was transferred to Toronto in 1974, and then in 1981 to Calgary. He became an officer in 1986 and served in Ottawa and New Brunswick.

In 1993, Zaccardelli became Chief Superintendent in charge of Criminal Operations in Quebec. In 1995, he was promoted to Assistant Commissioner, then to Deputy Commissioner in 1998, responsible for National Headquarters. In 1999, he became the Deputy Commissioner, Organized Crime and Operational Policy. From 2 September 2000 to 15 December 2006, he served as the 20th Commissioner of the RCMP. He presided over the RCMP during changes made to Canada's policing, security and military apparatus after 11 September 2001. Prior to his departure, he collected numerous Canadian honours and two foreign honours.

=== Income trust file ===
In late 2005, the status of income trusts was uncertain. After the close of the markets on 23 November 2005, Finance Minister Ralph Goodale made a surprise announcement that the government would not tax the trusts, and would instead cut dividend taxes. This made trusts and dividend paying stocks even from a taxation perspective. The markets rallied in the hours leading up to the announcement by the government allegedly due to leaks. During the following days, the S&P/TSX Composite Index reached a new five-year high. The day's biggest gainers were income trusts, income-trust candidates, high dividend-paying companies, and the TSX Group itself. The minority Liberal government of Paul Martin fell to a motion of no confidence on 28 November 2005. An election campaign for a 23 January 2006 election began the next day. Near the end of December, the Royal Canadian Mounted Police announced a criminal investigation into the leaking of news of a federal tax change for income trusts. The announcement came in the form of a letter from Zaccardelli to New Democratic Party Member of Parliament Judy Wasylycia-Leis. The RCMP came under criticism for announcing the probe during the campaign. The matter was investigated by the Commission for Public Complaints Against the RCMP (CPC), the external review body of RCMP members' conduct. The report of the commissioner concluded that there was no evidence to suggest Zaccardelli deliberately meddled with the electoral process. The chair of the CPC judged Zaccardelli and other RCMP members having acted in an inappropriate manner by not cooperating with the external investigation.

=== Maher Arar file ===
Zaccardelli's role in the affair of computer engineer, Maher Arar had been the subject of intense speculation and controversy. Arar, a Canadian citizen who was born in Syria, was stopped at a New York airport on his way home from a vacation in September 2002. United States officials accused him of links to al-Qaeda and deported him to Syria, where he was imprisoned and tortured for months. The decision to deport Arar was said to be based on inaccurate and misleading information provided by the RCMP that suggested Arar was linked to the militants. Members of the House of Commons Committee on Public Safety and National Security have called Zaccardelli's testimony in this matter "contradictory", with Liberal MP Mark Holland saying "We've now got Mr. Zaccardelli in my opinion perjuring himself before a parliamentary committee." The contradictions were with respect to what he knew at the time and what he told government ministers. Zaccardelli resigned from his post as Commissioner on 6 December, effective 15 December 2006. Prime Minister Stephen Harper announced in the House of Commons that Zaccardelli had resigned. "Today, Commissioner Zaccardelli submitted his resignation to me and I have accepted it," Harper said. "The commissioner has indicated to me that it would be in the best interests of the RCMP to have new leadership as this great organization faces challenges in the future." Zaccardelli became the first commissioner in the history of the RCMP to be forced to resign because of controversy.

Before Zaccardelli's resignation, on 28 September 2006, he issued an apology to Arar and his family during the House of Commons committee on public safety and national security:

Mr. Arar, I wish to take this opportunity to express publicly to you and to your wife and to your children how truly sorry I am for whatever part the actions of the RCMP may have contributed to the terrible injustices that you experienced and the pain that you and your family endured.

Arar thanked Commissioner Zaccardelli for his apology but lamented the lack of concrete disciplinary action against those individuals whose actions led to his detention and subsequent torture.

=== RCMP's pension and insurance plans ===
In March 2007, RCMP officers testified before the Public Accounts Committee that they had grave questions about the handling of the funds and that they believed senior officers were to blame. They alleged fund misappropriation and nepotism and that senior RCMP management covered up the problems. In testimony before the committee, Zaccardelli rejected accusations that he was involved in a cover up of alleged irregularities, fraud and abuse involving the RCMP's pension and insurance plans.

== Honours ==
Zaccardelli was awarded the following medals and commendations during his policing career:

Commander Order of Merit of the Police Forces	2002
Commander of the Order of St. John of Jerusalem	2003
125th Anniversary of the Confederation of Canada Medal	1992
Queen Elizabeth II Golden Jubilee Medal	2002
Royal Canadian Mounted Police Long Service Medal	1990
Légion d'honneur (Officer)	2003
Commemorative Medal for the Centennial of Saskatchewan	2005
Alberta Centennial Medal	2005
Order of Merit of the Italian Republic (Grand Officer)	2005
