= George Arthur French =

British Army general (1841–1921)

Major-General Sir George Arthur French KCMG
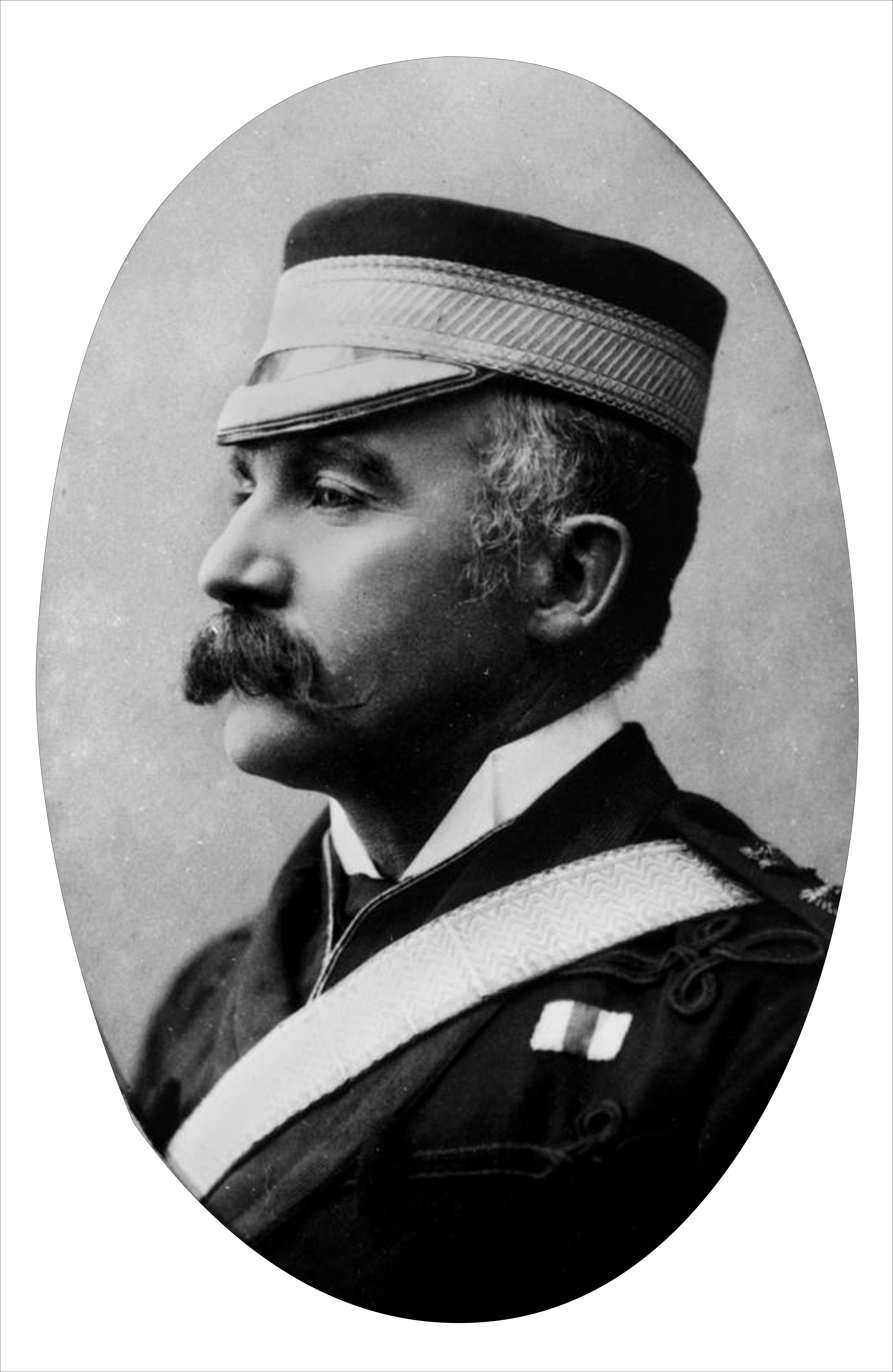
- French as a colonel in 1883
- Born: 19 June 1841; Roscommon, Ireland
- Died: 7 July 1921 (aged 80); Kensington, England
- Burial place: Brompton Cemetery, London
- Military career
- Allegiance: United Kingdom
- Branch: British Army
- Service years: 1860–1902
- Rank: Major-General
- Commands: Commandant of the New South Wales Military Forces (1896–1902); Commandant of the Queensland Defence Force (1883–1891); Commissioner of the North-West Mounted Police (1873–1876)
- Conflicts: Red River Rebellion; North-West Frontier

Major-General Sir George Arthur French KCMG (19 June 1841 – 7 July 1921) was an Irish soldier who served as an officer in the British Army, as the first Commissioner of the North-West Mounted Police, from October 1873 to July 1876, and as Commandant of the colonial military forces in Queensland (1883–91) and New South Wales (1896–1902)

George Arthur French was born at Roscommon, Ireland. He was educated at the Royal Military College, Sandhurst, and the Royal Military Academy, Woolwich, and commissioned in the Royal Artillery in 1860.

In 1871, at the request of the Canadian government, he was sent to Canada as a military inspector, eventually becoming head of the School of Gunnery at Kingston, Ontario.

French was appointed to organise the North-West Mounted Police on its creation in 1873, and the next year he led the force on its famous March West to suppress the illegal whiskey trade in the wake of the Cypress Hills Massacre.

French resigned in 1876 and returned to duty in the British Army, eventually attaining the rank of major general. The organizational skills developed in Canada were used to establish local defence forces in India and Australia. In September 1883 he was appointed Commandant of the Queensland Local Forces with the local rank of colonel, and arrived in the colony on 4 January 1884. Colonel French married, in 1862, Janet Clarke, daughter of the late Robert Long Innes, formerly of the 37th Regiment. Colonel French retired in 1891, and returned to England, but was back in Australia as commandant in North South Wales from 1896 until 1902.

He retired from the army on 3 September 1902, was knighted as Knight Commander of the Order of St Michael and St George (KCMG) in the November 1902 Birthday Honours list, and was invested with the insignia by King Edward VII at Buckingham Palace on 18 December 1902.

For the next 19 years much of his time was spent guarding the crown jewels in London, where he died in 1921.
