= James Howden MacBrien =

Canadian Army general officer (1878–1938)

Sir James MacBrien
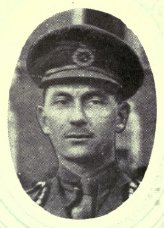
- Sir James MacBrien
- Born: 30 June 1878 near Myrtle, Ontario
- Died: 5 March 1938 (aged 59) Toronto, Ontario
- Buried: Beechwood Cemetery, Ottawa, Ontario
- Allegiance: Canada
- Branch: Canadian Militia
- Rank: Major-General
- Commands: Chief of the General Staff
- Conflicts: Second Boer War; World War I
- Awards: Knight Commander of the Order of the Bath; Companion of the Order of St Michael and St George; Distinguished Service Order; Order of St. John

Major General Sir James Howden MacBrien KCB CMG DSO CStJ (30 June 1878 – 5 March 1938) was a Canadian soldier and Chief of the General Staff, the head of the Canadian Militia (renamed the Canadian Army in 1940) from 1920 until 1927.

== Military career ==
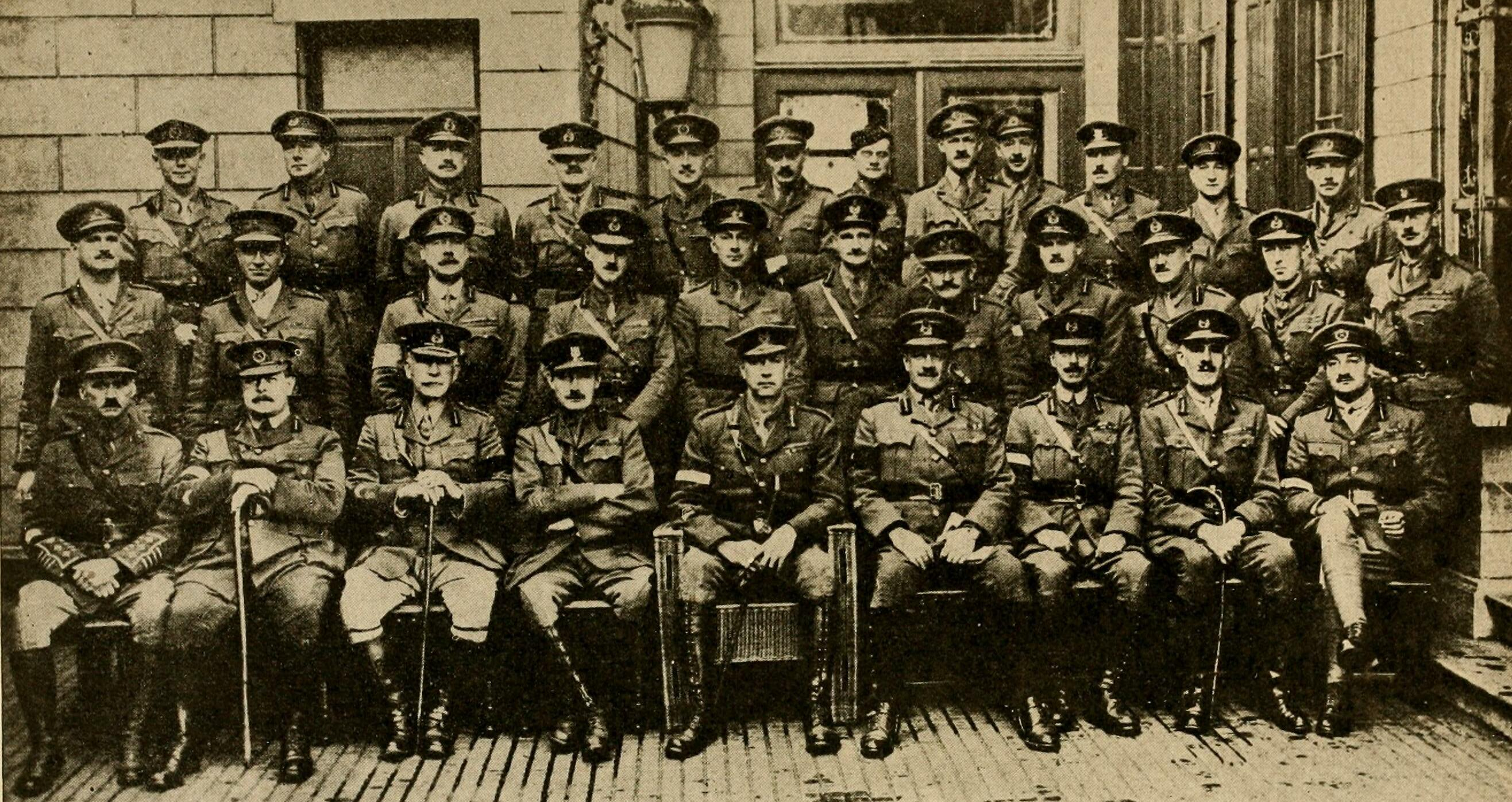
Lieutenant General Sir Arthur Currie with H. R. H. Prince Arthur of Connaught and other senior officers. Brigadier General J. H. MacBrien is stood in the second row, fifth from the left, directly behind Currie.

Educated in Port Perry (Port Perry High School), MacBrien initially joined the Canadian Militia with the 34th Ontario Regiment but then transferred to the North-West Mounted Police and, during the Second Boer War, to the South African Constabulary. Returning to Canada he was commissioned into the Royal Canadian Dragoons.

He also served in World War I as a general staff officer and then, from 1916, as commanding officer of 12th Infantry Brigade. He was promoted to brevet lieutenant colonel in January 1917.

After the war he was appointed Chief of the General Staff.

He also served as the eighth Commissioner of the Royal Canadian Mounted Police, from August 1, 1931, to March 5, 1938. MacBrien died in Toronto.

== Family ==
In 1907 he married Nellie Louise Ross and in 1928 he married Emily Emely Hartridge.

== Bibliography ==
- Davies, Frank; Maddocks, Graham (2014) [1995]. Bloody Red Tabs: General Officer Casualties of the Great War 1914–1918. Pen and Sword Books. ISBN 978-1-78346-237-7.
