= Commissioner of the Royal Canadian Mounted Police =

Professional head of the agency

- Commissaire de la Gendarmerie royale du Canada
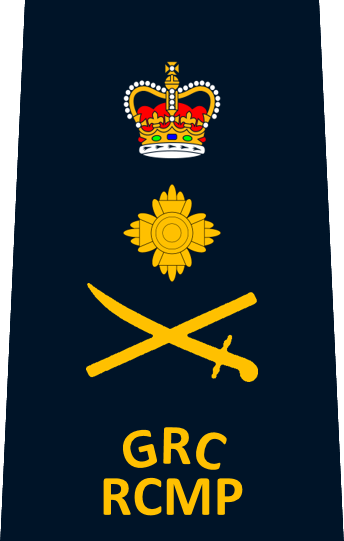
- Rank badge (left) and slip on (right)
- Incumbent; Michael Duheme since March 17, 2023
- Royal Canadian Mounted Police
- Reports to: Minister of Public Safety
- Appointer: Governor in Council; on the advice of the prime minister
- Term length: At His Majesty's pleasure
- Constituting instrument: Royal Canadian Mounted Police Act
- Inaugural holder: W. Osborne Smith
- Formation: 1873
- Website: www.rcmp-grc.gc.ca

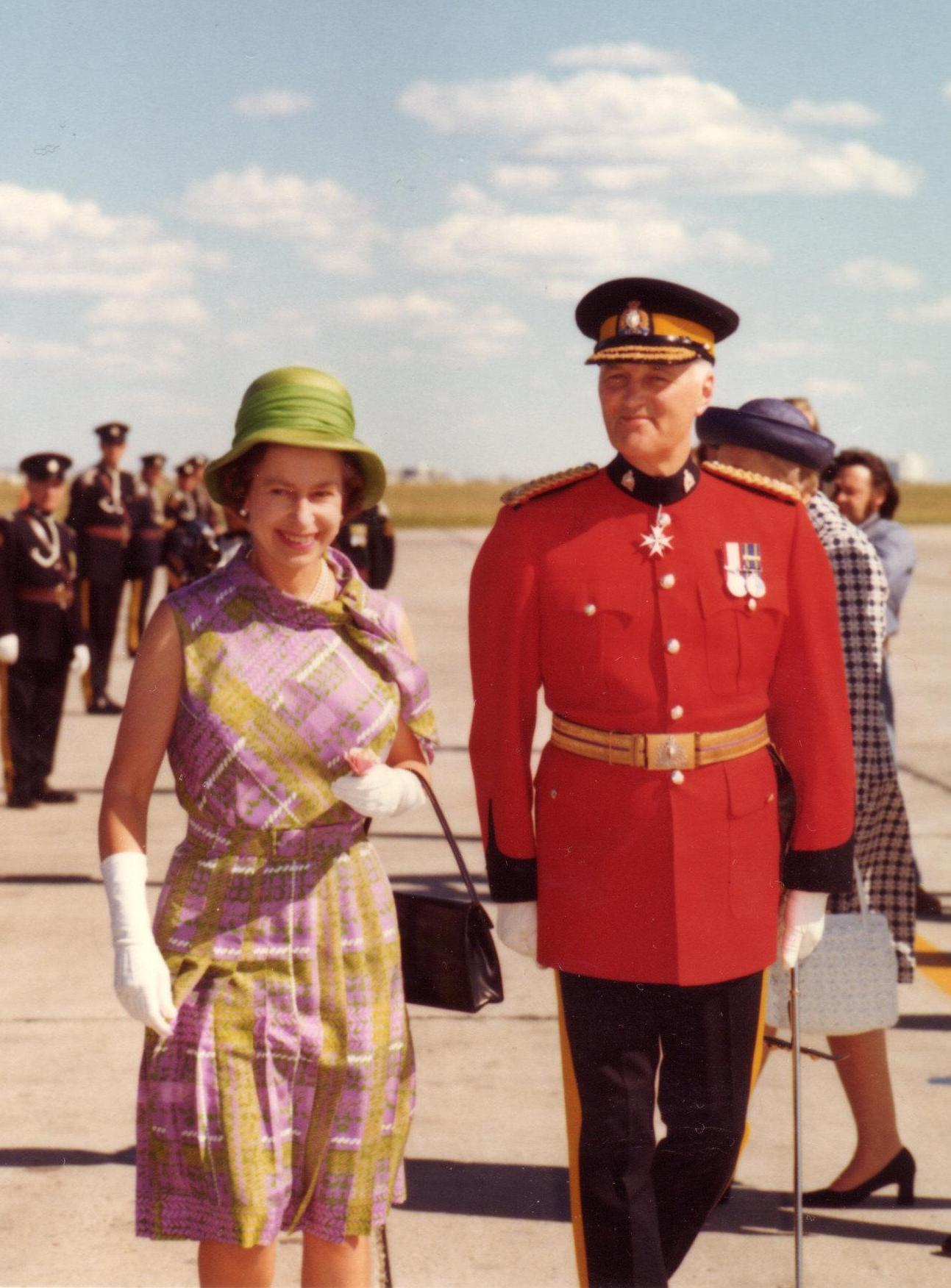
Commissioner William Higgitt and Queen Elizabeth II, RCMP Centennial Celebrations, Regina, 1973

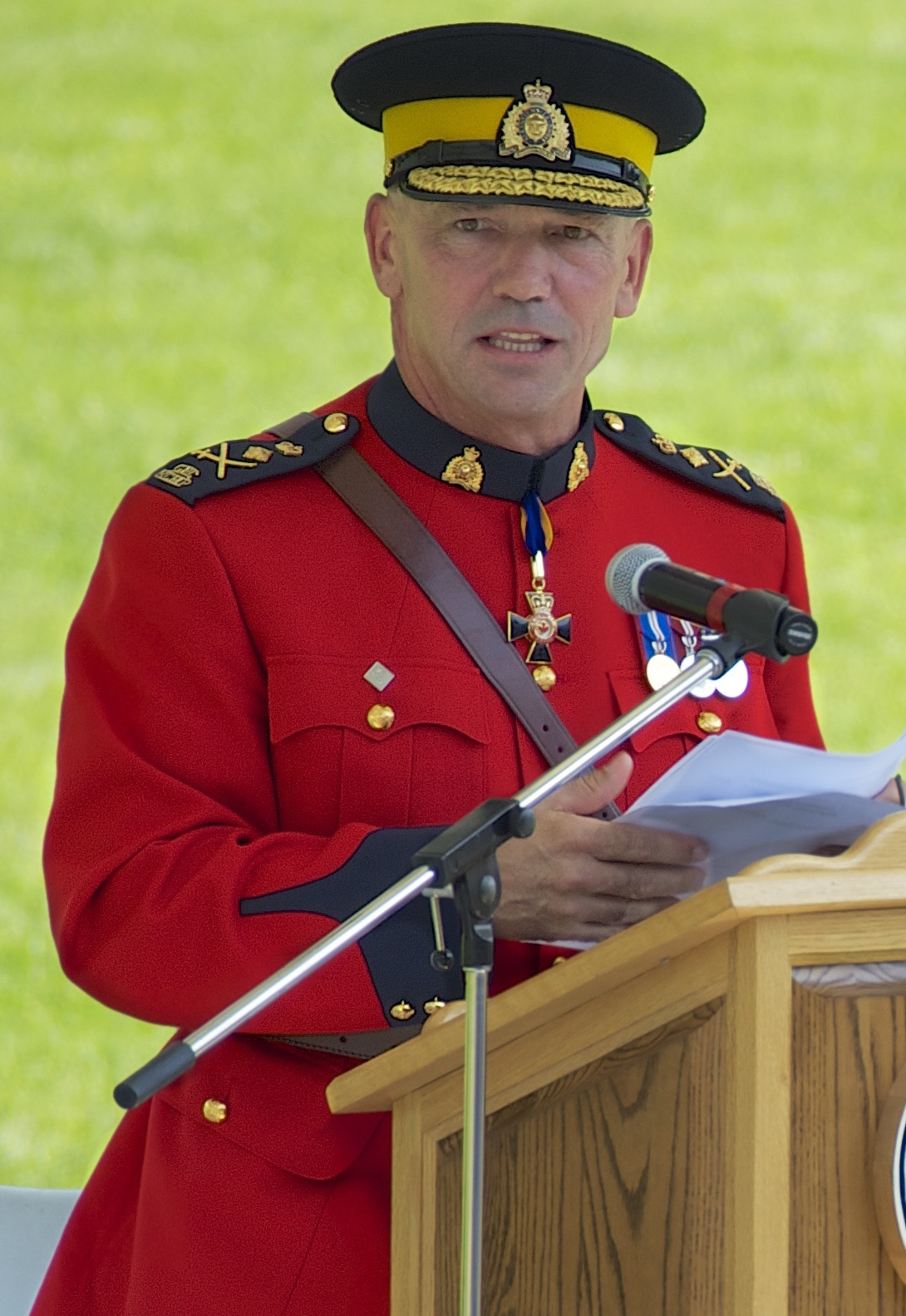
Commissioner Bob Paulson speaking at the opening of the 65th Glengarry Highland Games in 2012

The commissioner of the Royal Canadian Mounted Police (French: commissaire de la Gendarmerie royale du Canada) is the professional head of the Royal Canadian Mounted Police (RCMP). The commissioner exercises control and management of the RCMP under the direction of the minister of public safety. The position is a Governor in Council appointment made on the advice of the prime minister of Canada.

In addition to their role in the management of the RCMP, the commissioner serves as Principal Commander of the Order of Merit of the Police Forces. Under the Firearms Act, the RCMP commissioner also serves as the commissioner of firearms, the chief executive of the Canadian Firearms Program.

Michael Duheme is the 25th commissioner of the RCMP, having taken office in an interim capacity on March 17, 2023, and permanently as of the Change Command ceremony held on May 25, 2023.

Queen Elizabeth II was commissioner-in-chief from 2012 to 2022, and King Charles III was honorary commissioner of the RCMP from 2012 until 2023. In recognition of the RCMP's 150th anniversary and the upcoming coronation, on April 28, 2023, King Charles III consented to assume the title of the RCMP Commissioner-in-Chief. However, neither appointment (commissioner-in-chief or honorary commissioner) exercises a substantive role in the operation of the organization.

== List of commissioners ==
There have been 25 commissioners, including one acting commissioners and one interim commissioner, and excluding one unofficial acting commissioner since the founding of the North-West Mounted Police in 1873:

List of commissioners
Agency	No.	Image	Name	Term start	Term end	Time in Office	Notes
North-West Mounted Police (NWMP) designated "Royal" in 1904 (RNWMP) (1873–1920)	1		W. Osborne Smith	September 25, 1873	October 17, 1873	22 days	Acting commissioner of the NWMP
North-West Mounted Police (NWMP) designated "Royal" in 1904 (RNWMP) (1873–1920)	2		George Arthur French	October 18, 1873	July 21, 1876	2 years, 277 days	
North-West Mounted Police (NWMP) designated "Royal" in 1904 (RNWMP) (1873–1920)	3		James Farquharson MacLeod	July 22, 1876	October 31, 1880	4 years, 101 days	
North-West Mounted Police (NWMP) designated "Royal" in 1904 (RNWMP) (1873–1920)	4		Acheson Gosford Irvine	November 1, 1880	March 31, 1886	5 years, 150 days	First Canadian born man to hold the post
North-West Mounted Police (NWMP) designated "Royal" in 1904 (RNWMP) (1873–1920)	5		Lawrence William Herchmer	April 1, 1886	July 31, 1900	14 years, 121 days	Was a civilian at the time of his appointment although with an army background.
North-West Mounted Police (NWMP) designated "Royal" in 1904 (RNWMP) (1873–1920)	6		Aylesworth Bowen Perry	August 1, 1900	March 31, 1923	22 years, 242 days	Perry was the commissioner of the NWMP when King Edward VII awarded the force the title "Royal" (RNWMP) in 1904, and was still commissioner when the RNWMP merged with the Dominion Police in 1920 to form the RCMP, with Perry appointed the first commissioner of the RCMP.
Royal Canadian Mounted Police (RCMP) (1920–present)	6		Aylesworth Bowen Perry	August 1, 1900	March 31, 1923	22 years, 242 days	Perry was the commissioner of the NWMP when King Edward VII awarded the force the title "Royal" (RNWMP) in 1904, and was still commissioner when the RNWMP merged with the Dominion Police in 1920 to form the RCMP, with Perry appointed the first commissioner of the RCMP.
Royal Canadian Mounted Police (RCMP) (1920–present)	7		Cortlandt Starnes	April 1, 1923	July 31, 1931	8 years, 121 days	
Royal Canadian Mounted Police (RCMP) (1920–present)	8		Sir James Howden MacBrien	August 1, 1931	March 5, 1938	6 years, 216 days	Only Commissioner to die in office of a heart attack. One of only two Mounties to be knighted for his WWI service with the British Army. Had some NWMP training prior to WWI but was called up as a reservist just after training in 1914.
Royal Canadian Mounted Police (RCMP) (1920–present)	9		Stuart Taylor Wood	March 6, 1938	April 30, 1951	13 years, 55 days	
Royal Canadian Mounted Police (RCMP) (1920–present)	10		Leonard Hanson Nicholson	May 1, 1951	March 31, 1959	7 years, 334 days	
Royal Canadian Mounted Police (RCMP) (1920–present)	11		Charles Edward Rivett-Carnac	April 1, 1959	March 31, 1960	365 days	
Royal Canadian Mounted Police (RCMP) (1920–present)	12		Clifford Walter Harvison	April 1, 1960	October 31, 1963	3 years, 213 days	
Royal Canadian Mounted Police (RCMP) (1920–present)	13		George Brinton McClellan	November 1, 1963	August 14, 1967	3 years, 286 days	
Royal Canadian Mounted Police (RCMP) (1920–present)	14		Malcolm Francis Aylesworth Lindsay	August 15, 1967	September 30, 1969	2 years, 46 days	RCMP Patrol Vessel Lindsay was named in his honour.
Royal Canadian Mounted Police (RCMP) (1920–present)	15		William Leonard Higgitt	October 1, 1969	December 28, 1973	4 years, 88 days	RCMP Patrol Vessel Higgitt was named in his honour.
Royal Canadian Mounted Police (RCMP) (1920–present)	16		Maurice Jean Nadon	January 1, 1974	August 31, 1977	3 years, 242 days	RCMP Patrol Vessel Nadon was named in his honour. The present-day RCMP National Headquarters building in Ottawa was named in his honour on October 5, 2011.
Royal Canadian Mounted Police (RCMP) (1920–present)	17		Robert Henry Simmonds	September 1, 1977	August 31, 1987	9 years, 364 days	RCMP Patrol Vessel Simmonds was named in his honour.
Royal Canadian Mounted Police (RCMP) (1920–present)	18		Norman Inkster	September 1, 1987	June 24, 1994	6 years, 296 days	RCMP Patrol Vessel Inkster was named in his honour.
Royal Canadian Mounted Police (RCMP) (1920–present)	19		Joseph Philip Robert Murray	June 25, 1994	September 1, 2000	6 years, 68 days	
Royal Canadian Mounted Police (RCMP) (1920–present)	20		Giuliano Zaccardelli	September 2, 2000	December 15, 2006	6 years, 104 days	
Royal Canadian Mounted Police (RCMP) (1920–present)	21		Beverley Busson	December 15, 2006	July 16, 2007	213 days	Interim commissioner; Busson was the RCMP's first female commissioner.
Royal Canadian Mounted Police (RCMP) (1920–present)	22		William J. S. Elliott	July 16, 2007	November 20, 2011	4 years, 127 days	First civilian commissioner.
Royal Canadian Mounted Police (RCMP) (1920–present)	23		Bob Paulson	November 21, 2011	June 30, 2017	5 years, 221 days	
Royal Canadian Mounted Police (RCMP) (1920–present)	—		Dan Dubeau	June 30, 2017	April 16, 2018	290 days	Acting commissioner; Dubeau served in the role at the rank of deputy commissioner.
Royal Canadian Mounted Police (RCMP) (1920–present)	24		Brenda Lucki	April 16, 2018	March 17, 2023	4 years, 335 days	Lucki was the RCMP's first permanent female commissioner.
Royal Canadian Mounted Police (RCMP) (1920–present)	25		Michael Duheme	March 17, 2023	Incumbent	3 years, 249 days	
