= Aylesworth Bowen Perry =

Major-General Aylesworth Bowen Perry CMG
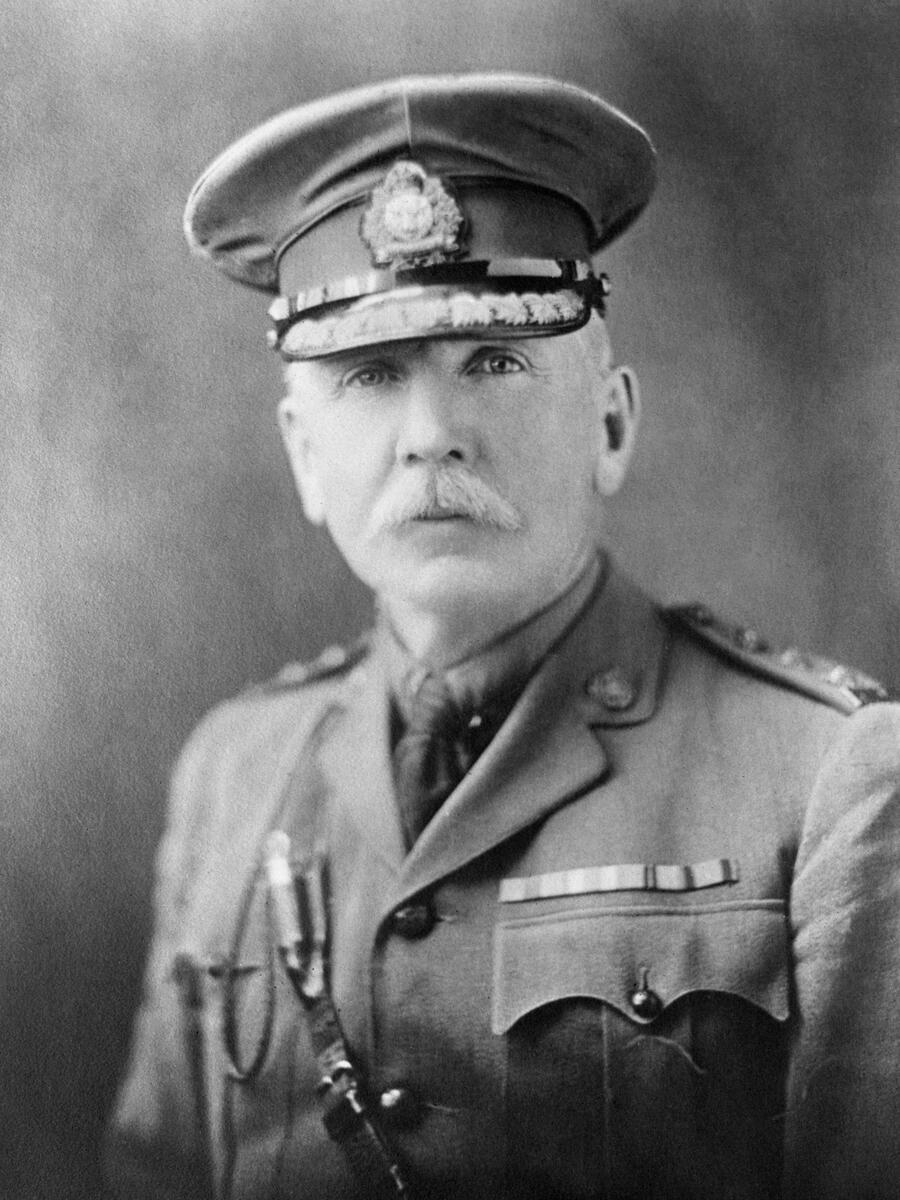
- Born: August 21, 1860; Violet, near Napanee, Ontario, Canada
- Died: February 14, 1956 (aged 95) Ottawa, Ontario, Canada
- Allegiance: Canada
- Branch: North-West Mounted Police, Royal Canadian Mounted Police
- Service years: 1882-1923
- Rank: Commissioner; Major-General
- Commands: Commissioner of the Royal Canadian Mounted Police
- Awards: Order of St. Michael and St. George Honorary Aide-de-camp

Aylesworth Bowen Perry, CMG (August 21, 1860 – February 14, 1956) served as the sixth Commissioner of the Royal Canadian Mounted Police, from August 1, 1900, to March 31, 1923.

== Early life ==
Aylesworth Perry was born at Violet, near Napanee, Ontario, on August 21, 1860. His father William Perry was a Justice of the Peace, deputy-reeve, and member of the Lennox and Addington County Council. William Perry operated a flour mill and sawmill on Mill Creek in Violet and approximately half of his acres was under cultivation. William Perry married Eleanor Fraser in 1848. Eleanor Fraser was the daughter of Isaac Fraser, a magistrate, a militia colonel, and a onetime member of the Legislative Council. He attended high school in Napanee in 1876. He was educated as part of the first class at the Royal Military College of Canada in Kingston, Ontario, student #13, one of the "Old Eighteen."

Since cadets received their numbers based on their standings in the entrance examinations, he was 13 of 18. At fifteen, he was one of the youngest students at RMC. He graduated at the top of his class receiving the Governor-General's gold and silver medals. He received a commission and was gazetted as a lieutenant in the Royal Engineers of the Imperial British Army. A serious accident prevented him from attending the convocation ceremonies. The Commandant of Royal Military College of Canada secured a six-month healing period before Perry reported to the Royal Engineers in England.

== Career ==
He was commissioned as a lieutenant in the Royal Engineers. When the Royal Engineer's medical staff determined that Perry's leg was not yet properly healed, his commanding officer advised him to return to Canada. He subsequently resigned his commission. He worked as a surveyor in what is now northern Ontario. From 1881 to 1882 Perry worked with the Geological Survey of Canada in Ottawa, Ontario, as a librarian.

On January 24, 1882, he was appointed an inspector in the North-West Mounted Police. During the North-West Rebellion of 1885, he was appointed a major in the Canadian Militia, and received command of the second section of the Alberta Field Force. He led a march from Calgary, Alberta, to Edmonton, Alberta. While crossing the Red Deer River, he nearly died landing a tow rope attached to the raft carrying a field gun. Following the rebellion, he was appointed superintendent of the Prince Albert district, on August 1, 1885.

Since game was disappearing and the incoming of the railways was rendering useless the occupation of freighting on the prairie he recommended that the Métis earn a living through farming, "The mass of the half-breed population must therefore turn their attention to other methods of making a living. They have no alternative: farming must become their occupation in earnest. The English and Scotch half-breeds have already done this successfully; but very few of French descent have yet made any real attempt at it." Perry continued, "As farming is the inevitable pursuit of the French half-breeds, all who are friendly to them should agree in urging and encouraging them to remain on their present holdings, so that they may at once face their destiny and ultimately obtain the position of a self-supporting people. They should be treated with patience and aided generously, remembering that it is not easy for white men possessing all the advantages of education and civilization to change their occupation. Can the half-breed hunter or freighter be expected to be more apt in adapting himself to change? It would be an astonishing thing if they quietly and quickly adapted themselves to the work of a farm on which success is only obtained by hard, patient and continuous labour." He concluded, "There is a tendency on the part of some to regard the problem of the future of these people as insolvable. Knowing their many sterling qualities I cannot despair, but believe their descendants will be prosperous and desirable citizens of our North-West Territory." As Superintendent, in command of the Prince Albert district in 1888, he praised the work of the missionaries amongst the Indians, "The hope of improvement in the Indian lies in the training of the rising generation, and it is to be hoped that before long the children will be taken in hand."

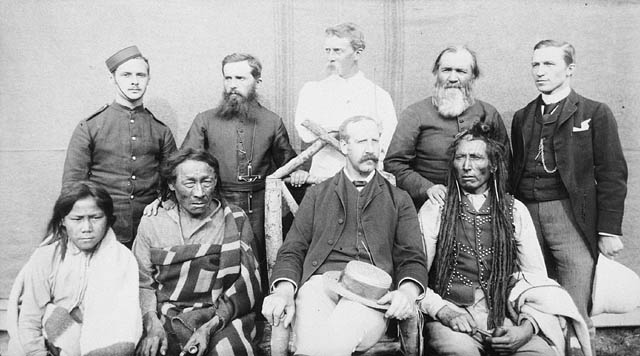
Group of nine taken in the square of the North-West Mounted Police Barracks, 1889 at Regina (Saskatchewan) Poundmaker, Big Bear, Big Bear's son, Father Andre, Father Conchin, Chief Stewart, Capt. Deane, Mr. Robertson, and the court interpreter

He was in command at the Depot, Regina, from 1889 to 1897. While in Regina, he qualified in law and was called to the Bar of the North-West Territories.

In 1897, he was given command of the Calgary district. A contingent under his command travelled to London, England, for Queen Victoria's Diamond Jubilee in 1897. He created a new North-West Mounted Police post at Vancouver. He was placed in command of the police in the Yukon in 1899. "When R.G. Beth remarked to me that it was generally looked on as rather a dangerous thing to let a body of men loose amid the temptations of a strange city, Perry replied: 'That has no bearing on these men, even though there was a saloon on every corner. Every man feels that the honour and good name of the force depend on his individual conduct, and so he can be trusted.'"

He was appointed Commissioner of the North-West Mounted Police from August 1, 1900, and served until his retirement on April 1, 1923. He served for nearly 23 years in office, and was the longest-serving commissioner of the RCMP. He found it difficult to get convictions in local courts for cattle-killers, mail-robbers and others since jurymen and others sympathized with the accused "I regret that convictions for the serious crimes were not secured against the guilty parties. Evidence was produced for the defence which could well be doubted. Not only has this case produced sympathy for crime, but in other cases, it has been plainly manifested. Petitions have been forwarded to lessen the penalties where laws of the country have wilfully and knowingly been broken. So notorious has this become, that it has disheartened us in attempting to secure criminal convictions. There seems to be an absurd idea that the dismissal of a charge means a snub to the Mounted Police, whereas it strikes home at the root of society and threatens the lives and property of the very men who jeer and flaunt."

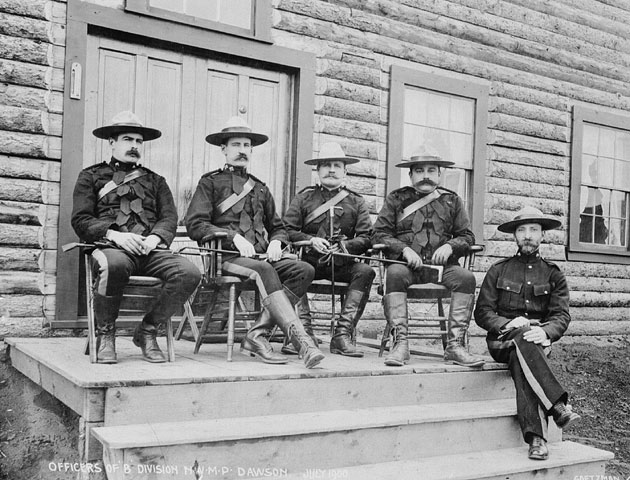
North-West Mounted Police (now RCMP) officers, Yukon, 1900, wearing the famous scarlet uniform that includes a flat-brimmed Stetson hat.

As commissioner, he organized a secret service for intelligence gathering, instituted annual training classes, increased pay rates, revised regulations related to marriage, formed two squadrons to fight in the First World War and approved changes to the uniform, with perhaps the formal adoption of the Stetson hat in 1901 being the most noted.

Nevertheless, after the Prince Albert mail was held up near Humboldt, the first stage robbery ever accomplished in the territories, Perry and his detachments landed the robber, a man named Garnett, who was given a long-term sentence in the penitentiary.

King Edward VII added the title "Royal" to the North-West Mounted Police in 1904 when Perry was in command.

In 1909, the following appeared in the London Gazette Supplementary: "Chancery of the Order of St. Michael and St. George, Downing Street, 9th November 1909 - The King has graciously pleased to give direction for the following appointment to the Most Distinguished Order of St. Michael and St. George: - To be a Companion of the Most Distinguished Order, Aylesworth Perry, Commissioner of the Royal Northwest Mounted Police, Dominion of Canada."

In 1911, he commanded a contingent of Royal North-West Mounted Police which took part in the Empire Celebrations in England, at the time of the Coronation of King George V and Queen Mary.

The future of the force was in doubt. The departures to serve overseas during World War I, weakened the force. The creation of provincial police forces in Alberta and Saskatchewan reduced the force's responsibilities.

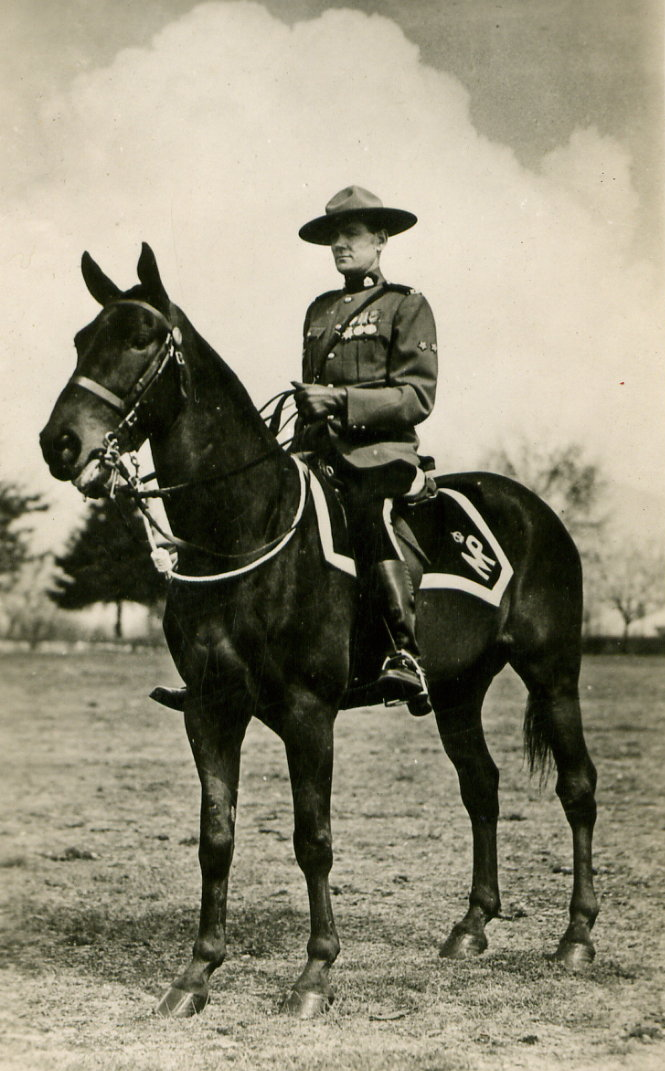
RCMP postcard circa 1920

The force controlled postwar unrest. Perry was a principal adviser to the government during the Winnipeg General Strike in 1919. After the war, he reorganized the force as the Royal Canadian Mounted Police. By modernizing the force's equipment and methods, he transformed the frontier police to a modern national police force. In 1919, he worked out the details of the force's expansion and the move of its headquarters. The Force absorbed the Dominion Police, extended police services throughout Canada and moved headquarters from Regina, Saskatchewan, to Ottawa, Ontario. The Force emerged as the Royal Canadian Mounted Police in 1920.

By February 1, 1920, the Royal Canadian Mounted Police were operating throughout Canada. Perry retired from the Royal Canadian Mounted Police in 1923. He was conferred the equivalent military rank of major-general. He died in Ottawa, Ontario, on February 14, 1956, in his 96th year. He was the last surviving member of the "Old Eighteen" from Royal Military College of Canada.

== Family ==
Aylesworth Perry married Emma Duranty Meikle, the daughter of the postmaster and general merchant in Lachute, Quebec on June 5, 1883. Their son, Kenneth Meikle Perry (born November 7, 1884) would later become a professor at the Royal Military College of Canada and retire as a Brigadier from the Canadian militia. Aylesworth Perry's grandson (through his daughter Gladys Jean Perry and her husband George Leslie Jennings), # 2772 Lt. Bernard P. [Perry] Jennings, Royal Canadian Engineers, graduated from Royal Military College of Canada in 1942 as a member of College's, "Last War Class." He subsequently took part in the D-Day landings, 6 June 1944, but sadly he was killed-in-action near Falaise, Normandy, on 14 August 1944."

His great-grandson (via another daughter, Jessie Eleanor Perry) is former BC Premier Gordon Campbell, who served from 2001 to 2011.

== Honours ==
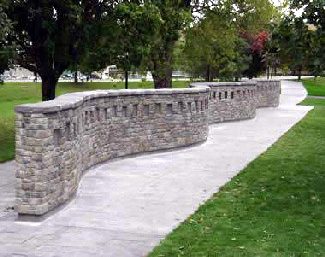
Wall of Honour, Royal Military College of Canada

In 1909, he was appointed Companion of the Order of St. Michael and St. George. In 1920 he was given the title "Honorary Aide-de-camp to His Excellency The Governor General". Upon his retirement, he was awarded the rank of Major-General by the Canadian Militia. In 1948, he was the only member of the "Old Eighteen" to be present at the re-opening of the Royal Military College of Canada and he took the salute for the match past of the "New Hundred".

The Royal Canadian Mounted Police named the A.B. Perry building at the Depot, Regina in his honour. In 2009, 13 Major-General A.B. Perry, CMG ADC (1860–1956) was added to the wall of honour at the Royal Military College of Canada in Kingston, Ontario. Bowen Island, St. Joseph Channel, Algoma was named in honour of Major General Aylesworth Bowen Perry (RMC 1880), Commissioner, Royal Northwest Mounted Police.
