= Brenda Lucki =

24th Commissioner of the Royal Canadian Mounted Police

Brenda Lucki COM

24th Commissioner of the Royal Canadian Mounted Police
- In office April 16, 2018 – March 17, 2023
- Minister: Ralph Goodale; Bill Blair; Marco Mendicino
- Preceded by: Dan Dubeau (acting)
- Succeeded by: Michael Duheme

Personal details
- Born: 1966 (age 59–60) Edmonton, Alberta, Canada
- Children: 2 (step children)
- Education: University of Alberta (BA)
- Occupation: Police officer

Brenda Lucki COM is a Canadian retired police officer who served as the 24th commissioner of the Royal Canadian Mounted Police from April 2018 to March 2023. She is the first woman to permanently hold the position.

By virtue of her role, Lucki was the ex-officio Principal Commander of the Order of Merit of the Police Forces.

== Early life and education ==
Lucki was born in 1966 and raised in Edmonton, Alberta. She graduated from the University of Alberta with a Bachelor of Arts degree.

== Police career ==
In 1986, she joined the Royal Canadian Mounted Police (RCMP). Throughout her career, she has served in numerous provinces in Canada, to include: Quebec, Ontario, Manitoba, Saskatchewan and Alberta.

From 1993 to 1994, she served on the United Nations Protection Force in the former Yugoslavia.

Lucki's other appointments and postings included the RCMP's peacekeeping program in Ottawa in 1995, and she was appointed to Commandant of the RCMP Academy, Depot Division in 2017.

Lucki was appointed RCMP Commissioner in 2018 by the government of Justin Trudeau, following the retirement of Commissioner Bob Paulson.

On February 15, 2023, Lucki announced her retirement as a personal decision, effective March 17. On March 17, it was accounted that Michael Duheme would serve as interim commissioner until the appointment of a permanent successor.

=== 2022 invocation of Emergencies Act ===
On May 11, 2022, Lucki stated under oath to the Special Joint Committee on the Declaration of Emergency (DECD) that "while her agency was consulted, it never requested nor recommended the [Emergencies Act]'s use." The Senate and the House of Commons agreed to strike this committee to investigate the events associated with invocation of the Emergencies Act in the wake of the 2022 Freedom Convoy to Parliament Hill.

== Criticism ==
Lucki has been subject to a number of criticisms in her role as police commissioner.

=== Systemic racism in policing ===
In June 2020, Lucki was criticized for her explanation of systemic racism in the force, when she compared it to height. She later admitted she “struggled” with the concept of systemic racism, and dismissed allegations of the RCMP holding racial biases different from any other organization.

Lucki later commented that she better understood the concept of systemic racism and how it might exist within the RCMP.

=== Spying on climate activists ===
In January 2022, a Canadian federal court ruled Lucki breached duty by failing to respond to a watchdog report on the alleged spying on anti-oil protestors.

=== Alleged political interference in the Nova Scotia mass murder investigation ===
On June 21, 2022, the Halifax Examiner published an article alleging that—at the onset of the 2020 Nova Scotia mass homicide investigation—Lucki promised Public Safety Minister Bill Blair and the Prime Minister’s Office to leverage the murders to get a gun control law passed. The article alleges that Lucki pressured the RCMP to release details of the murder weapons despite the insistence of RCMP commanders that releasing this information might jeopardize the investigation.

== Awards and decorations ==
Lucki's personal awards and decorations received during her policing career include the following:

Ribbon	Description	Notes
	Order of Merit of the Police Forces	Appointed Commander (COM) on 16 April 2018; Appointed Member (MOM) on 11 January 2013
	Canadian Peacekeeping Service Medal	
	United Nations Medal	90 Days Service on Peacekeeping Mision in Croatia and Bosnia and Herzegovina; during the Yugoslav Wars
	Queen Elizabeth Diamond Jubilee Medal	Decoration awarded in 2012; Canadian version
	Royal Canadian Mounted Police Long Service Medal	2006 (20 Years), 2011 (25 Years), 2016 (30 Years), 2021 (35 Years)
	Commemorative Medal for the Centennial of Saskatchewan	27 May 2005
Pin	Commander's Commendation	2003
None	Order of St John's Certificate	1994
Pin	UN Force Commander's Commendation	1993
