= Bill Blair =

Canadian politician and diplomat (born 1954)

The Honourable Bill Blair PC COM
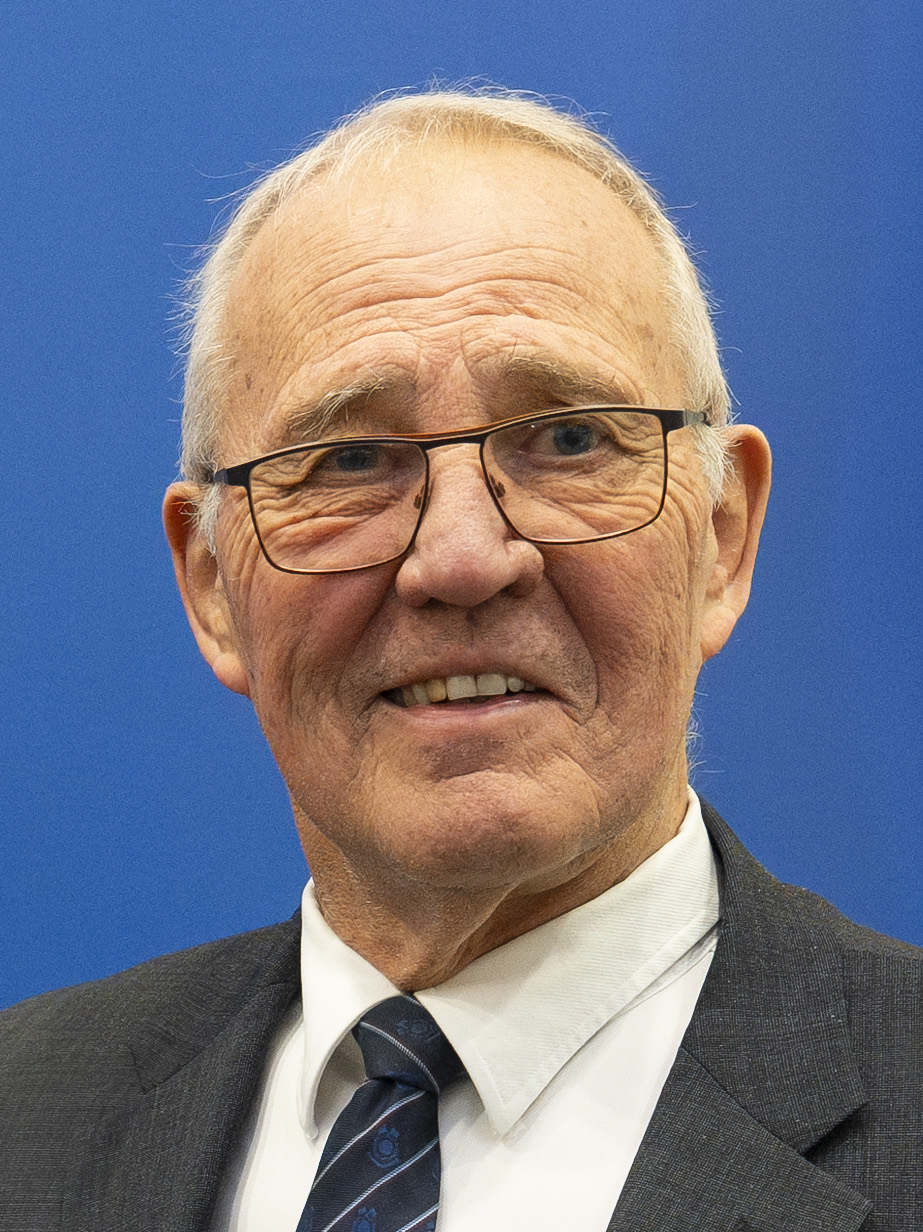
- Blair in 2025

High Commissioner of Canada to the United Kingdom
- Incumbent
- Assumed office March 12, 2026
- Prime Minister: Mark Carney
- Preceded by: Ralph Goodale

Minister of National Defence
- In office July 26, 2023 – May 13, 2025
- Prime Minister: Justin Trudeau; Mark Carney
- Preceded by: Anita Anand
- Succeeded by: David McGuinty

Minister of Emergency Preparedness
- In office October 26, 2021 – July 26, 2023
- Prime Minister: Justin Trudeau
- Preceded by: Himself (as Minister of Public Safety and Emergency Preparedness)
- Succeeded by: Harjit Sajjan

Minister of Emergency Management and Community Resilience
- In office November 20, 2019 – October 26, 2021
- Prime Minister: Justin Trudeau
- Preceded by: Ralph Goodale
- Succeeded by: Marco Mendicino (as Minister of Public Safety); Himself (as Minister of Emergency Preparedness)

Minister of Border Security and Organized Crime Reduction
- In office July 18, 2018 – November 20, 2019
- Prime Minister: Justin Trudeau
- Preceded by: Position established
- Succeeded by: Position abolished

Parliamentary Secretary to the Minister of Justice
- In office January 28, 2017 – July 18, 2018
- Minister: Jody Wilson-Raybould
- Preceded by: Sean Casey
- Succeeded by: Marco Mendicino

Member of Parliament for Scarborough Southwest
- In office October 19, 2015 – February 2, 2026
- Preceded by: Dan Harris
- Succeeded by: Doly Begum

Chief of the Toronto Police Service
- In office April 6, 2005 – April 25, 2015
- Preceded by: Mike Boyd
- Succeeded by: Mark Saunders

Personal details
- Born: William Sterling Blair; 1954 (age 71–72) Scarborough, Ontario, Canada
- Party: Liberal
- Spouse: Susanne Blair
- Children: 2 sons; 1 daughter
- Education: University of Toronto (BA)
- Police Career
- Department: Toronto Police Service
- Service years: 1975–2015
- Rank: Chief of Police
- Awards: Commander of the Order of Merit of the Police Forces; Police Exemplary Service Medal; Member of the Order of St. John; Queen Elizabeth II Diamond Jubilee Medal

William Sterling Blair (born 1954) is a Canadian diplomat, politician, and former police officer who has served as the Canadian High Commissioner to the United Kingdom since 2026. A member of the Liberal Party, he formerly represented Scarborough Southwest in the House of Commons from 2015 to 2026. Blair held Cabinet portfolios during the Justin Trudeau and Mark Carney governments, including the role of Minister of National Defence from 2023 to 2025. Before entering politics, Blair worked for four decades with the Toronto Police Service (TPS), serving as the chief of police from 2005 until retiring in 2015.

== Life and education ==
Blair was born in 1954 in Scarborough, Ontario. Blair's father had served as a police officer for 39 years. Blair considered pursuing a degree in law or finance when he initially enrolled at the Scarborough campus of the University of Toronto in the mid 1970s. Blair initially studied economics in university before he left to follow his ambition of being a police officer. He later returned to the University of Toronto and completed a Bachelor of Arts in economics and criminology.

Blair is married to Susanne McMaster, and together they have three grown children (2 sons and daughter) and 2 grandchildren.

== Police career ==
Blair joined the Metropolitan Toronto Police while in university to make money and began taking courses on a part-time basis. Blair walked a beat near Regent Park and later worked as an undercover officer in Toronto's drug squad.

After Blair earned his bachelor's degree in criminology, he advanced his career in the police service in the late 1980s, taking part in drug busts involving the seizure of millions of dollars of cocaine. Chief David Boothby assigned Blair to improve the poor community relations between the officers of 51 Division, which patrolled Blair's old beat near Regent Park. Blair normalized police relations with the community by measures such as sending cops to read to kids in local elementary schools and engaging with local businesses and churches.

In 1999, Blair was considered as a candidate to replace outgoing Chief Boothby, but Mayor Mel Lastman, with the support of Premier Mike Harris, chose to hire Julian Fantino, then head of the York Regional Police. After reorganization of the senior ranks after Fantino's ascension as police chief, Blair became head of detective operations.

=== Chief of the Toronto Police Service ===
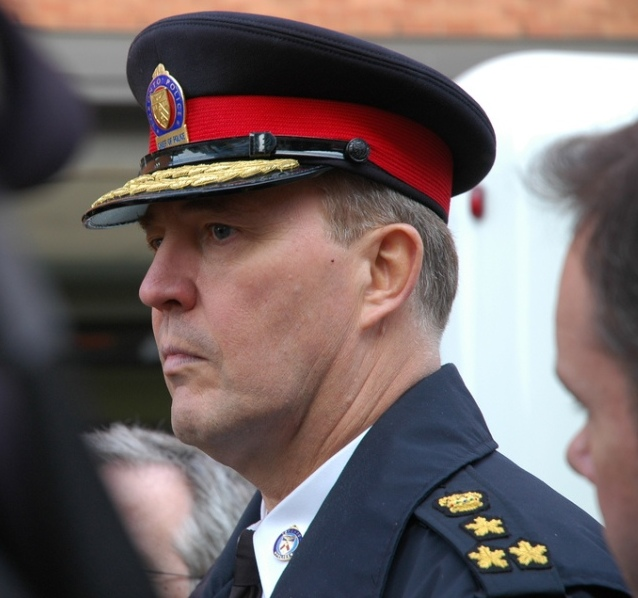
Blair in 2015.

Blair was selected in a 4–2 vote of the Toronto Police Services Board in early April 2005, and formally appointed Chief of the Toronto Police Service on April 26, 2005. He succeeded Mike Boyd, who had served as interim chief after the expiry of Julian Fantino's contract. Prior to his appointment as chief, Blair worked for approximately 30 years as a Toronto police officer, with assignments involving drug enforcement, organized crime and major criminal investigations. Blair served as president of the Canadian Association of Chiefs of Police.

In the spring of 2009, Tamil Canadians in Toronto upset by civilian deaths in the Sri Lankan Civil War, which included an overnight artillery bombardment that killed 378 civilians and wounded 1,100, allegedly perpetrated by the Sri Lankan military, staged a series of protests in Toronto, including shutting down the northbound and southbound lanes of University Avenue for four days while protesting in front of the US Consulate, and illegally blocking traffic on the Gardiner Expressway. Blair and the police faced pressure to crack down on the demonstrations, arrest and deporting the protesters. Instead, Blair used his experience in community policing to ensure that minimal force was used, spoke respectfully of the protesters' rights to expression, and negotiated the peaceful resolution of the events. The Canadian Tamil Congress would later award Blair an inaugural "Leaders for Change Award" for his leadership during the protests.

During demonstrations against the G20 Toronto Summit nearly 1,000 arrests were made, making it the largest mass arrest in Canadian history. In the aftermath of the protests, the Toronto Police Service and the Integrated Security Unit (ISU) for the summit were heavily criticized for brutality during the arrests. Protests called for Blair to resign. In a December 2010 interview, Blair indicated that he would not resign, despite growing criticism of his leadership during and after the summit.

A class action lawsuit was begun against TPS on behalf of all of those who were arrested in spite of the TPS's several attempts to stop proceedings. As of November 10, 2016, the Supreme Court of Canada ruled that it will not hear the Toronto Police Services Board's appeal, and the suit was able to proceed to trial. On August 17, 2020, the lawsuit had resulted in a $16.5 million settlement. Those arrested were each awarded dollar amounts ranging from $5,000 to $24,700.

Responding to questions about a controversial regulation enacted by the Cabinet of Ontario to increase police powers during the summit, Blair was supportive, stating that "it was passed in exactly the procedure as described in our legislation in Ontario." Post-summit reports revealed that on June 25, prior to the start of the summit and shortly after Blair defended a widely reported misinterpretation of the regulation in a press conference, the police department received a government bulletin clarifying the misinterpretation and explaining that the new regulation accorded them no additional power to demand identification outside of the summit perimeter. Blair's spokesperson stated that as of the press conference, Blair was unaware of the clarification; however, Blair did not retract his prior remarks to the press after receiving the bulletin. When interviewed after the summit, Blair confirmed that there was never an extraordinary legal requirement for the public to present identification within five metres of the perimeter fence, but that he "was trying to keep the criminals out." In December 2010, following a critical report by Ontario Ombudsman André Marin, Blair admitted regret that he had initially interpreted the regulation at face value and did not promptly clear up confusion about the meaning of the regulation.

In 2013, Blair came into conflict with Toronto Mayor Rob Ford after confirming to the media that the police had obtained a video of the mayor smoking what appeared to be crack cocaine. Blair said he was "disappointed" in the mayor. As the investigation into the mayor and his friend Alessandro Lisi continued, Mayor Ford dared Blair to arrest him and accused him of wasting money in their surveillance of Ford. Rob Ford's brother, Councillor Doug Ford, claimed that Blair had "gone rogue" and violated the Police Services Act when speaking out about the mayor during the ongoing police investigation. On August 11, 2014, Blair served Councillor Doug Ford with notice of defamation. Doug Ford accused the police chief of using the suit as "payback" in retaliation against the mayor for not extending his contract, but apologized for his comments shortly afterwards.

In his last years in office, Blair was in conflict with several members of the Toronto Police Services Board over resistance to proposed reforms as well as his resistance to cut the police budget. On July 30, 2014, the board announced that it would not renew Blair's contract for a third, five-year term. He retired from the police service when his contract ended on April 25, 2015, and was succeeded by Deputy Chief Mark Saunders.

== Political career ==
Blair declined to comment on his future plans while he was still police chief. The Liberal Party recruited Blair to be its candidate in Scarborough Southwest for the 2015 federal election to be held October. On April 25, 2015, Blair confirmed his intention to seek the Liberal Party nomination in Scarborough Southwest. He won the Liberal nomination on June 13, 2015.

=== 42nd Parliament ===
On October 19, 2015, Blair was elected to the 42nd Canadian Parliament in the Scarborough Southwest riding. On January 28, 2017, Blair was named parliamentary secretary to the minister of justice. In January 2016, Blair was named as the head of the federal-provincial task force tasked with creating a plan for the legalization of cannabis in Canada. On September 19, 2017, Blair assumed the role of parliamentary secretary to the minister of health.

Blair has held a number of roles working with the Department of Public Safety and Emergency Preparedness.

On July 18, 2018, Blair joined Cabinet when he was appointed Minister of Border Security and Organized Crime Reduction.

=== 43rd Parliament ===
Blair was made Minister of Public Safety and Emergency Preparedness on November 20, 2019, soon after his re-election to the 43rd Canadian Parliament. In his role he oversaw the closure of the border between Canada and the United States during the COVID-19 pandemic.

=== 44th Parliament ===
Blair became President of the Privy Council on October 26, 2021, and dropped public safety from his portfolio, becoming Minister of Emergency Preparedness, soon after his re-election to the 44th Canadian Parliament. In November 2021, Blair oversaw the Canadian Armed Forces' operation to help those in the Pacific coast of British Columbia amidst torrential rains that caused landslides and floods. Blair played a key role in the federal government's response to the Canada convoy protest, where the Emergencies Act was invoked. In September 2022, Blair coordinated the federal response to Hurricane Fiona.

During a cabinet shuffle in July 2023, he was made Minister of National Defence. Blair continued to hold that role under new Liberal leader Mark Carney's 30th Canadian Ministry.

=== 45th Parliament ===
Blair was reelected in the 2025 Canadian federal election and was removed from cabinet in the subsequent cabinet shuffle. In February 2026, Mark Carney announced Blair's appointment as Canada's High Commissioner to the United Kingdom.

== Diplomatic career ==
On February 2, 2026, Blair resigned his seat to become the Canadian High Commissioner to the United Kingdom, an appointment that took effect in spring 2026.

== Awards and recognition ==
In 2007, he was appointed an Officer of the Order of Merit of the Police Forces and in 2012, he was elevated within the Order to the level of Commander. He is a Member of the Venerable Order of Saint John. On January 19, 2013, Blair was honoured by the Canadian Tamil Congress, with their inaugural "Leaders for Change Award" for his exemplary leadership during the protests of 2009 in Toronto.

Ribbon	Description	Notes
	Order of Merit of the Police Forces (COM)	Commander 5 January 2012.; Officer 11 January 2007.
	Order of St John	Member
	Queen Elizabeth II Diamond Jubilee Medal	2012; Canadian Version of this Medal
	Police Exemplary Service Medal	Medal 17 July 1997; 1st Bar 21 June 2007

== Electoral record ==
2025 Canadian federal election: Scarborough Southwest
Party	Candidate	Votes	%	±%
Liberal	Bill Blair	33,495	61.49	+3.53
Conservative	Asm Tarun	16,652	30.57	+9.98
New Democratic	Fatima Shaban	2,730	5.01	–10.97
Green	Amanda Cain	754	1.38	–0.87
People's	Michael Poulin	567	1.04	–1.84
Centrist	Imran Khan	165	0.30	+0.28
Marxist–Leninist	Christine Nugent	113	0.21	N/A
Total valid votes		54,476	99.52	
Total rejected ballots		264	0.48	-0.28
Turnout		54,740	63.32	+6.14
Eligible voters		86,452		
Liberal notional hold		Swing		–3.22
Source: Elections Canada

2021 Canadian federal election: Scarborough Southwest
Party	Candidate	Votes	%	±%	Expenditures
Liberal	Bill Blair	24,823	57.50	+0.29	$59,762.16
Conservative	Mohsin Bhuiyan	8,981	20.80	+0.06	$74,180.31
New Democratic	Guled Arale	6,924	16.04	+0.51	$33,149.66
People's	Ramona Pache	1,259	2.92	+1.75	$2,513.29
Green	Amanda Cain	1,068	2.47	-2.42	$1,982.23
Independent	David Edward-Ooi Poon	117	0.27	N/A	$0.00
Total valid votes/expense limit		43,172	99.25	–	$109,258.84
Total rejected ballots		325	0.75	-0.13	
Turnout		43,497	56.82	-7.61	
Eligible voters		76,558			
Liberal hold		Swing		+0.12	
Source: Elections Canada

2019 Canadian federal election: Scarborough Southwest
Party	Candidate	Votes	%	±%	Expenditures
Liberal	Bill Blair	28,965	57.20	+4.74	$59,424.78
Conservative	Kimberly Fawcett Smith	10,502	20.74	-0.48	$31,378.91
New Democratic	Keith McCrady	7,865	15.53	-8.20	$32,226.21
Green	Amanda Cain	2,477	4.89	+2.31	$4,140.81
People's	Italo Eratostene	590	1.17		$5,716.04
Animal Protection	Simon Luisi	236	0.47		none listed
Total valid votes/expense limit		50,635	99.12		
Total rejected ballots		449	0.88	+0.31	
Turnout		51,084	65.43	-2.23	
Eligible voters		79,291			
Liberal hold		Swing		+2.61	
Source: Elections Canada

2015 Canadian federal election: Scarborough Southwest
Party	Candidate	Votes	%	±%	Expenditures
Liberal	Bill Blair	25,586	52.47	+23.13	$153,155.47
New Democratic	Dan Harris	11,574	23.73	-11.13	$48,940.84
Conservative	Roshan Nallaratnam	10,347	21.22	-10.46	$64,631.85
Green	Tommy Taylor	1,259	2.58	-1.48	$5,572.61
Total valid votes/expense limit		48,766	99.44		$205,220.58
Total rejected ballots		277	0.56	–	
Turnout		49,043	66.65	–	
Eligible voters		73,580			
Liberal gain from New Democratic		Swing		+17.13	
Source: Elections Canada

29th Canadian Ministry (2015–2025) – Cabinet of Justin Trudeau
Cabinet posts (4)
Predecessor	Office	Successor
Anita Anand	Minister of National Defence; July 26, 2023 – May 13, 2025	David McGuinty
Dominic LeBlanc	President of the King's Privy Council for Canada; October 26, 2021 – July 26, 2023	Harjit Sajjan
Ralph Goodale	Minister of Public Safety and Emergency Preparedness; November 20, 2019 – October 26, 2021	Marco Mendicino
Position created	Minister of Border Security and Organized Crime Reduction; July 17, 2018 – November 20, 2019	Position abolished
