= Thomas Carrique (police officer) =

Commissioner of the Ontario Provincial Police

Thomas Carrique COM

15th Commissioner of the Ontario Provincial Police
- Incumbent
- Assumed office June 6, 2019
- Preceded by: Vince Hawkes

Deputy Chief of the York Regional Police
- In office March 23, 2011 – June 6, 2019

Personal details
- Occupation: Police officer
- Police career
- Department: York Regional Police (1990–2019); Ontario Provincial Police (2019–present)
- Rank: Commissioner
- Awards: Commander of the Order of Merit of the Police Forces; Police Exemplary Service Medal

Thomas W. B. Carrique COM is a Canadian police officer who has been the commissioner of the Ontario Provincial Police since June 6, 2019. Before joining the Ontario Provincial Police (OPP), Carrique was a member of the York Regional Police, where he was the deputy chief of police from 2011 to 2019.

== Career ==
=== York Regional Police ===
Carrique joined the York Regional Police in 1990. He has worked in the intelligence unit, the drugs and vice enforcement unit, and led the traffic bureau, organized crime unit, and special services unit before being named a deputy chief of police in 2011. He left the York Regional Police in 2019 after 29 years, which he emotionally described as "hardest decision of my life".

=== Ontario Provincial Police ===
==== Appointment as Commissioner ====
Carrique was initially the provincial government's second choice behind Superintendent Ron Taverner of the Toronto Police Service to lead the OPP, however, Taverner withdrew his name from consideration in March 2019 after claims of political interference due to his close relationship with Premier Doug Ford sparked an investigation by the provincial integrity commissioner.

==== Notable events ====
In May 2020 Carrique went public with his concerns over a "toxic workplace culture" and the officer suicide problem experienced by the OPP. Between 2012 and 2020, 17 OPP officers committed suicide.

Following the death by gunfire of Constable Marc Hovingh in November 2020, in October 2021 Carrique reached out to a local newspaper to explain how the OPP had improved member wellness since he arrived on the scene.

On March 24, 2022, Carrique testified before the House of Commons Standing Committee on Public Safety and National Security that the OPP's intelligence bureau identified a threat associated with the Freedom Convoy protest in Ottawa on February 7, one week before the federal government invoked the Emergencies Act". He stated that the demonstrations constituted a "provincial and national emergency", and that the "situation and the associated events simultaneously taking place across Canada required unprecedented national collaboration to prevent injury, preserve life and protect critical infrastructure."

== Awards and honours ==
Carrique was named a member of the Order of Merit of the Police Forces on January 11, 2013, he was promoted to Officer of the Order of Merit on January 20, 2020, and to Commander on January 12, 2023. On October 21, 2021, he earned a 30 year bar to his Police Exemplary Service Medal.

On November 30, 2021, Carrique received an honour from First Nations leaders for his work following National Inquiry into Missing and Murdered Indigenous Women and Girls.

== Family ==
Carrique's son Danny serves in the South Simcoe Police Service, and his daughter is a crime analyst. He was inspired to become a police officer by his father, who was an auxiliary officer with the Toronto Police Service.
