= Julian Fantino =

Canadian politician (born 1942)

The Honourable Julian Fantino PC COM OOnt OMRI
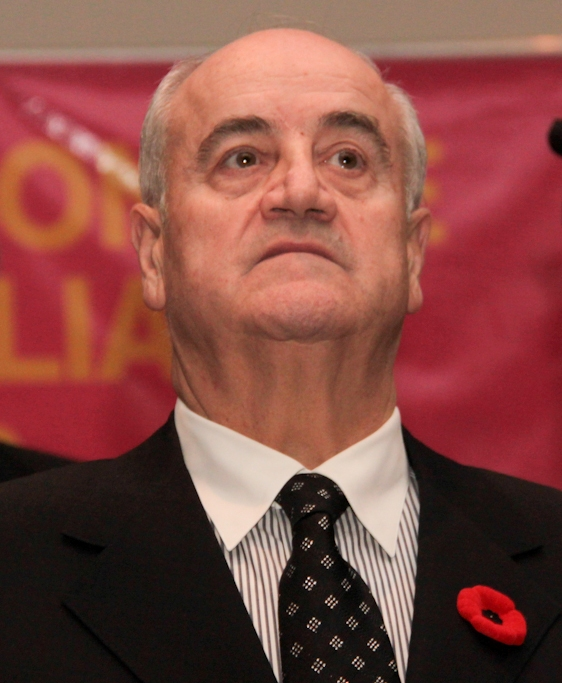
- Fantino in November 2012

Member of Parliament for Vaughan
- In office November 29, 2010 – August 4, 2015
- Preceded by: Maurizio Bevilacqua
- Succeeded by: Francesco Sorbara

Associate Minister of National Defence
- In office January 5, 2015 – November 4, 2015
- Prime Minister: Stephen Harper
- Preceded by: Kerry-Lynne Findlay
- Succeeded by: Kent Hehr
- In office May 18, 2011 – July 4, 2012
- Prime Minister: Stephen Harper
- Preceded by: Mauril Bélanger (2006)
- Succeeded by: Bernard Valcourt

Minister of Veterans Affairs
- In office July 15, 2013 – January 5, 2015
- Prime Minister: Stephen Harper
- Preceded by: Steven Blaney
- Succeeded by: Erin O'Toole

Minister for International Cooperation
- In office July 4, 2012 – July 15, 2013
- Prime Minister: Stephen Harper
- Preceded by: Bev Oda
- Succeeded by: Christian Paradis

Minister of State for Seniors
- In office January 4, 2011 – May 18, 2011
- Prime Minister: Stephen Harper
- Preceded by: Position established
- Succeeded by: Alice Wong

Commissioner of the Ontario Provincial Police
- In office November 30, 2006 – November 29, 2010
- Preceded by: Gwen Boniface
- Succeeded by: Christopher D. Lewis

Ontario Commissioner of Emergency Management
- In office June 1, 2005 – November 29, 2006
- Preceded by: James Young
- Succeeded by: Jay Hope

Chief of the Toronto Police Service
- In office September 1, 2000 – April 30, 2005
- Preceded by: David Boothby
- Succeeded by: Mike Boyd

Chief of the York Region Police
- In office January 11, 1998 – August 31, 2000
- Preceded by: Peter Scott
- Succeeded by: Robert Middaugh

Chief of the London Police Service
- In office November 2, 1991 – January 10, 1998

Personal details
- Born: August 13, 1942 (age 83) Vendoglio, Treppo Grande, Province of Udine, Italy
- Party: Conservative
- Spouse: Liviana Fantino
- Children: 2
- Occupation: Retired
- Profession: Politician; police officer

Julian Fantino PC, COM, OOnt, OMRI (Italian: Giuliano Fantino; born August 13, 1942) is a Canadian retired police official and former politician. He was the Conservative Party of Canada Member of the Parliament of Canada for the riding of Vaughan following a November 29, 2010 by-election, until his defeat in 2015. On January 4, 2011, Fantino was named Minister of State for Seniors; on May 18, 2011, he became Associate Minister of National Defence; on July 4, 2012, he was named Minister for International Cooperation. Fantino served as the Minister of Veterans Affairs from 2013 until 2015, when he was demoted to his earlier post of Associate Minister of National Defence following sustained criticism of his performance at Veterans Affairs. He was defeated by Liberal candidate Francesco Sorbara in the 2015 election.

Prior to entering politics, Fantino had been a Toronto police officer since 1969. He served as chief of police of London, Ontario, from 1991 to 1998, of York Region from 1998 until 2000, and Toronto from 2000 to 2005. In 2005 until 2006, he was Ontario's Commissioner of Emergency Management before serving as the Commissioner of the Ontario Provincial Police from 2006 to 2010.

== Early life ==
Fantino was born in Vendoglio, Italy in 1942, and immigrated to Canada with his family when he was 11 years old.

== Early Toronto career ==
Before joining the Metro Toronto Police, Fantino was a security guard at Yorkdale Shopping Centre in suburban Toronto. He volunteered as an Auxiliary Police Officer for the Metro Toronto Police from 1964 to 1969 and then joined the force as a Police Constable. He was a member of the Drug Squad and was promoted to Detective Constable. He subsequently served with Criminal Intelligence and then the Homicide Squad before being promoted to Divisional Commander and then Acting Staff Superintendent of Detectives.

=== Wiretap controversy ===
According to an internal police report leaked in 2007, Fantino, as superintendent of detectives in 1991, had ordered a wiretap of lawyer Peter Maloney a police critic and friend of Susan Eng, chair of the Toronto Police Services Board, the body overseeing the Toronto Police service. Conversations between Maloney and Eng were illegally recorded despite a court order that only the first minute of Maloney's conversations were to be monitored so as to determine whether the individual who he was talking to was on the list of those being investigated.

=== Departure ===
After 23 years of service with the Metro Toronto Police, Fantino left to accept an appointment as police chief of London, Ontario, in 1991.

== London Police Service chief (1991-1998) ==
In London, he presided over the highly publicized and controversial "Project Guardian", in which over two dozen gay men were arrested for involvement in a purported child pornography ring. While several men were eventually convicted of crimes not related to the stated purpose of the investigation, such as drug possession and prostitution, no child pornography ring was ever found.

Journalist Gerald Hannon later published a piece in The Globe and Mail accusing Fantino of mounting an anti-gay witch hunt. In response, Fantino filed a complaint with the Ontario Press Council, which ultimately ruled that the Globe should have more clearly labelled Hannon's article as an opinion piece. John Greyson's CBC documentary After the Bath (1996) also covers the Project Guardian scandal in detail and makes similar conclusions as Hannon.

Fantino says that he is "not anti-gay or homophobic" and was simply arresting lawbreakers engaging in "a sick, perverted crime".

== York Regional Police chief (1998–2000) ==
Fantino returned to the Greater Toronto Area as Chief of York Regional Police in 1998. His tenure was brief and he returned to the Toronto Police Service two years later. He was succeeded as chief by Robert Middaugh.

== Toronto Police Service chief (2000–2005) ==
=== Policing controversies ===
An incident in September 2000 involving five male police officers entering a woman's bath house sparked public outrage and drew attention to TPS's poor standing in the gay community. In 2004, Fantino made an attempt to repair relations, primarily by appearing on the cover of fab in a photo which featured him posing in his police uniform with five other models dressed as the Village People standing behind him.

Fantino appeared to have little patience for protesters: he wanted them to ask police for permission before holding demonstrations. In one report, he commented "a problem is now arising where portions of the public believe that Dundas Square is a public space." In his new position with the OPP, Fantino took an aggressive posture with a native protest blocking a major highway: he stated he "would not/could not tolerate the 401 being closed all day." However, the commander on site decided against a raid as "[he was] not about to put people at risk for a piece of pavement."

In 2003, Fantino criticized the effectiveness of the Canadian gun registry.

Also in 2003, Fantino publicly named and identified several people as being under investigation for child pornography. Despite the lack of evidence, and the crown subsequently dropping the charges, at least one of the men publicly identified committed suicide, naming Fantino's intentional destruction of his reputation as the reason for his suicide in the suicide note.

=== Corruption scandals ===
Fantino came under increasing scrutiny due to three corruption scandals which broke out during his tenure and his handling of those incidents. Fantino was accused of having tried to deal with these cases out of public view and attempting to shield them from investigation by outside police services.

In one case, drug squad officers are alleged to have beaten and robbed suspected drug dealers. In another, plainclothes officers were charged with accepting bribes to help bars dodge liquor inspections. In the third, a group of officers who advocated on behalf of a drug-addicted car thief faced internal charges.

Two of these cases involve the sons of former police chief William McCormack, and came to light not as a result of investigations by Toronto police, but due to a Royal Canadian Mounted Police (RCMP) investigation into gangster activity which inadvertently uncovered evidence of wrongdoing by Toronto police officers. Mike McCormack was later cleared of all wrongdoing due to a lack of evidence.

In December 2009, Fantino was accused during a related court case of having "unplugged" a special task force investigating corruption charges against the Toronto Police Service's narcotics squad, thereby ignoring the task force's suspicions that another of the force's drug squads was corrupt. Lawyer Julian Falconer argued in court that "When Chief Fantino declared there were only a few bad apples, he did not deliver the straight goods," and shut down the investigation before it expanded as part of a damage-control campaign.

In March 2005, the CBC announced that they had obtained documents via the Access to Information Act showing that between 1998 and 2005 Toronto had spent $30,633,303.63 settling lawsuits against police. Norm Gardner said the settlement costs, which amount to about $5 million a year over six years, were expected, given the number of confrontations police face, suggesting that "people think they are going to get paid off."

== Contract expiry ==
Fantino's contract as police chief expired on February 28, 2005. On June 24, 2004, the police services board announced that it would not be reappointing Fantino due to a 2–2 tie. This was controversial since chair Norm Gardner had been suspended from the five-man board due to a conflict of interest ruling, but as he refused to vacate his seat the three required votes for renewal were far more difficult to obtain. Conservative politicians on Toronto City Council responded with a "Save Fantino" campaign, and the board was deadlocked on the issue of beginning the search for Fantino's replacement.

Many Fantino supporters claimed that the Mayor at the time, David Miller, was openly hostile to Fantino. Miller had ignored calls to pressure the police board after it voted against Fantino's renewal, yet Miller subsequently contacted the board looking for a role in hiring the next police chief, although the latter request was not granted.

Former deputy police chief Mike Boyd took over as interim chief of police on March 1, 2005. On April 6, another former deputy chief, Bill Blair, was named Fantino's permanent successor.

== Commissioner of Emergency Management (2005–2006) ==
On February 8, 2005, Fantino was appointed Ontario's commissioner of emergency management by Ontario premier Dalton McGuinty. This move was criticized by the opposition parties in the Legislative Assembly of Ontario, both for the lack of transparency in the hiring process and for the perception that the appointment was primarily motivated by the desire to avoid having Fantino run as a Progressive Conservative candidate in the 2007 provincial election against Finance Minister Greg Sorbara. However, Sorbara had also blamed Miller for failing to renew Fantino's contract, so this appointment could have also been seen as the Ontario Liberals' show of support for Fantino.

== Ontario Provincial Police commissioner (2006-2010) ==
Fantino was appointed Commissioner of the Ontario Provincial Police replacing the departed Gwen M. Boniface on October 12, 2006, by the provincial Liberal government; initially for a two-year term. His appointment was criticized by First Nations groups. In March 2008 his contract was extended until October 2009. In June 2009 his contract was further extended until July 2010 so that he could oversee the province's security contingent at the 2010 G8 Summit in Huntsville, Ontario.

He received much public attention over highly publicized child pornography busts, with 21 men arrested in February 2008 and 31 men (some as young as 14) arrested in February 2009. None of the cases has come to trial to date. During his term, Fantino has changed the look of the OPP by ordering that the livery for police cruisers be changed to a 1960s era black and white pattern.

Commissioner Fantino's salary, for 2009, was $251,989.44.

=== Shawn Brant controversy ===
Fantino was criticized by lawyer Peter Rosenthal during the trial of aboriginal activist Shawn Brant. Fantino was criticized for ordering wiretaps of Brant's phone without proper authority and for making provocative comments to Brant during negotiations to end a blockade of the rail line west of Kingston. By way of those illegal wiretaps, Fantino was recorded saying to Brant "You are going to force me to do everything I can; within your community and everywhere else; to destroy your reputation" and "your whole world is going to come crashing down" NDP MPP Peter Kormos called for Fantino's resignation accusing him of using "pugnacious and bellicose" rhetoric and for engaging in "Rambo-style policing." In the face of defence motions for the police to disclose more evidence about their conduct the Crown agreed to drop the most serious charges against Brant in exchange for a plea bargain resulting in a light sentence. Fantino was also criticized for his role in the Caledonia land dispute after he was accused of sending e-mails to local politicians accusing them of encouraging anti-police rallies by non-Natives.

=== Internal discipline hearing controversy ===
In late 2008 and early 2009, Fantino was embroiled in a controversy surrounding his role in an internal discipline case at the OPP, in which Fantino was accused of being petty and vindictive in his actions against the officers. Fantino ordered a hearing into the matter but attempted to remove the adjudicator he had appointed on the grounds that the judge was biased against the commissioner due to critical comments he made during testimony by Fantino. Divisional Court rejected Fantino's request. The Ontario Court of Appeal upheld the lower court decision saying an informed person viewing the matter realistically and practically would not conclude there was any apprehension of bias on the part of the adjudicator. The OPP dropped the disciplinary case against the two officers on December 15, 2009, the same day Fantino was due to be cross examined by defence lawyer Julian Falconer. The entire process cost more than $500,000 in public money.

=== Private prosecution charge for influencing or attempting to influence an elected official ===
Fantino was summoned in early January 2010 to face a charge of influencing or attempting to influence an elected official in April 2007 in Haldimand County, Ontario. The summons came after a December 31 Ontario Superior Court order demanding a formal charge be laid in relation to allegations against Mr. Fantino brought forward by a private complainant, Gary McHale, who alleged that Fantino was illegally influencing or attempting to influence municipal officials in regards to the Caledonia land dispute. The charge against Fantino was stayed in February 2010 as the Crown said there was no reasonable prospect of conviction.

=== $90,000,000 conspiracy lawsuit ===
On February 4, 2011, Gerald Guy Brummell of Trenton, Ontario filed a $90,000,000 lawsuit against 36 OPP officers, including Julian Fantino, in the Superior Court of Justice in Cobourg Ontario (File 11/11) alleging a conspiracy and coverup relating to the inappropriate use of the judicial system as a tool of revenge against Brummell and his family for complaining about a death threat by one of their officers. In early 2014 Superior Court Justice H.K. O’Connell sided with the government that the claim of malicious prosecution was not supported by evidence. Brummell has appealed this decision to the Court of Appeal for Ontario. On his web site, Brummell alleged that Fantino was an accessory to the murders of Jessica Lloyd and Marie France Comeau, and claimed OPP were knowledgeable of the earlier crimes of Colonel Russell Williams prior to his murders. The Crown settled the lawsuits brought against them by Williams victims, Larry and Bonnie Jones and Massicotte.

== Political aspirations ==
Following the resignation of John Tory as leader of the Progressive Conservative Party of Ontario Fantino's name was floated as a possible candidate in the ensuing leadership election. He ended speculation that he was interested in the job with a letter to the Globe and Mail.

There were rumours that he may run for Mayor of Vaughan, Ontario, in the October 25, 2010 municipal election following his retirement from the OPP. An April 2010, Toronto Star-Angus Reid poll indicates that Fantino would have the support of 43% of voters leading incumbent Mayor Linda Jackson who has 22% support. In an interview with CFRB on July 9, 2010, Fantino announced that he would not be running for mayor of Vaughan.

== Federal politics ==
On October 12, 2010, Fantino announced he would seek the nomination for the federal Conservative Party in the riding of Vaughan. It had been reported Prime Minister Stephen Harper had spoken to Fantino in early October about running as a Conservative and that Fantino was "leaning" toward doing so. A federal by-election had been made necessary after the resignation of Liberal MP Maurizio Bevilacqua.

Fantino was acclaimed as Conservative Party's candidate on October 14 and the by-election was called for November 29, 2010. During the campaign, he was dogged by a group called "Conservatives Against Fantino" led by Gary McHale and Mark Vandermaas, two activists critical of Fantino's role in the Caledonia controversy. The group picketed Fantino's campaign office and events, and became registered as a third party with Elections Canada under the name "Against Fantino" (after their use of the term "Conservatives" had been disallowed by the agency) in order to be permitted to spend money on printing and distributing 60,000 anti-Fantino pamphlets.

Fantino was elected to the House of Commons of Canada on November 29, 2010, by narrowly defeating Liberal candidate Tony Genco. The Globe and Mail noted that Fantino had "beat the Liberals out of one of their safest seats in Ontario, one they had held for 22 years."

On January 4, 2011, Fantino was named as Minister of State for Seniors. In Prime Minister Harper's cabinet shuffle following the 2011 federal election Fantino was promoted to Associate Minister of National Defence.

Following the departure of Bev Oda, Harper named Fantino the new Minister for International Cooperation portfolio on July 4, 2012, replacing him at National Defence with Bernard Valcourt.

On July 15, 2013, Fantino was shuffled to the position of Minister of Veterans' Affairs. Several months later, the veterans ombudsman reported that the government provides veterans with insufficient compensation for pain and suffering and criticized the government, saying that some would be near poverty because of cuts to pensions and benefits. In the same year, the department announced the closure of eight local offices servicing veterans. In January 2014, Fantino arrived late for a meeting with veterans about the closures and engaged in an angry confrontation with one of the veterans, resulting in accusations that Fantino was inept, rude and insensitive. In May, he was filmed ignoring and walking away from the angry wife of a veteran as she asked questions of him. Fantino was criticized for his department's difficulties in delivering help and benefits to veterans and for spending $4 million on advertising to explain the government's position while allowing more than $1 billion allocated for benefits to lapse. On January 5, 2015, after months of controversy, Fantino was replaced by Erin O'Toole and demoted to the position of Associate Defence Minister.

In the 2015 Canadian federal election, Fantino was defeated by Liberal candidate, Francesco Sorbara in the redistributed electoral district of Vaughan-Woodbridge.

== Assault charge ==
On October 1, 2015, a retired construction worker, John Bonnici, pressed charges against Fantino over an alleged incident on August 31, 1973, in which Bonnici claimed that Fantino poured ketchup down his (Bonnici's) buttocks and spread the condiment by stroking the outside of his pants with a baton. Fantino, who was seeking re-election to the House of Commons in the 2015 Canadian federal election, was charged with "assault with a weapon" — a police baton — and "assault causing bodily harm" against John Bonnici. The Crown dismissed the charge in December 2015 arguing that there was no reasonable prospect of conviction.

== Post-political life ==
=== Cannabis industry ===
In September 2017, Julian Fantino announced that he was working with Aleafia, a Concord Ontario-based company that is involved in the use of medical marijuana, one of the many start-ups capitalizing on Canada's then-upcoming legalization of cannabis. On October 31, 2017, Fantino was announced as Executive Chairman of Aleafia. In several news interviews, he explained how his attitude to the drug changed during his time as Veterans Affairs Minister when he saw the benefits of pot in assisting soldiers to deal with anxiety, sleep disorders and PTSD. Fantino, who had been the board's chair, resigned from the board effective May 15, 2020. He had been criticized for his involvement due to his longtime opposition to cannabis and having once compared legalizing the substance to legalizing murder. Fantino was also involved in a retail recreational cannabis store which opened in Toronto's Kensington Market in 2020.

=== Donald Best ===
On September 28, 2017, Julian Fantino swore an affidavit in support of his application to intervene in the judicial review of a decision by the Canadian Judicial Council in respect of a complaint by former Toronto Police officer Donald Best against Ontario Superior Court Justice J. Bryan Shaughnessy. Fantino's "extensive" 33 page plus 100 exhibits affidavit stated that Best was convicted "upon the presentation by lawyers of provably false evidence." and that that "disturbing" evidence suggests police resources and personnel were "improperly retained, used and co-opted" to help one side in the private civil dispute at the time that Fantino was Commissioner of the Ontario Provincial Police (but without his knowledge). Fantino further posited in the affidavit that there was a conspiracy involving secret backroom dealings by a judge and the police.

Mr. Fantino's application to intervene in the Donald Best matter was heard on October 11, 2017, before a Federal Court of Canada prothonotary. The court refused Fantino's application, but he subsequently filed an appeal of this decision which was to be heard on November 20, 2017 but was not heard by the court at that time. As of January 22, 2018, the legal case continues.

== Electoral record ==
2015 Canadian federal election: Vaughan—Woodbridge
Party	Candidate	Votes	%
Liberal	Francesco Sorbara	23,131	48.9%
Conservative	Julian Fantino	20,647	43.6%
New Democratic	Adriana Marie Zichy	2,198	4.6%
Libertarian	Anthony Gualtieri	731	1.5%
Green	Elise Boulanger	600	1.3%
Turnout		47,307	63.99%

2011 Canadian federal election: Vaughan
Party	Candidate	Votes	%	±%	Expenditures
Conservative	Julian Fantino	38,533	56.32	+7.22	
Liberal	Mario Ferri	20,435	29.87	-16.78	
New Democratic	Mark Pratt	7,940	11.60	+9.92	
Green	Claudia Rodriguez-Larrain	1,515	2.21	+0.99	
Total valid votes		68,423	100.00		
Total rejected ballots		480	0.70	+0.12	
Turnout		68,903	55.98	+23.48	
Conservative hold		Swing			

Canadian federal by-election, November 29, 2010: Vaughan resignation of Maurizio Bevilacqua on September 2, 2010
Party	Candidate	Votes	%	±%	Expenditures
Conservative	Julian Fantino	19,290	49.10	+14.77	–
Liberal	Tony Genco	18,326	46.65	-2.53	–
New Democratic	Kevin Bordian	661	1.68	-7.96	–
Green	Claudia Rodriguez-Larrain	481	1.22	-5.64	–
Libertarian	Paolo Fabrizio	251	0.64	–	–
Independent	Leslie Bory	111	0.28	–	–
Progressive Canadian	Dorian Baxter	110	0.28	–	–
United	Brian Jedan	55	0.14	–	–
Total valid votes/expense limit		39,285	100.00		$114,412
Total rejected ballots		231	0.58	-0.16	
Turnout		39,516	32.50	-19.42	
Conservative gain from Liberal		Swing		-8.6	

== Honours and awards ==
Ribbon	Description	Notes
	Order of Merit of the Police Forces (COM)	Degree of Commander; 21 January 2003
	Order of St. John	2001
	Order of Ontario (O.Ont)	2003
	125th Anniversary of the Confederation of Canada Medal	1992
	Queen Elizabeth II Golden Jubilee Medal	2002; Canadian Version of this Medal
	Queen Elizabeth II Diamond Jubilee Medal	2012; Canadian Version of this Medal
	Police Exemplary Service Medal	20 year Bar 12 December 1989; 30 year Bar 23 February 2000; 40 year Bar 13 March 2009
	Order of Merit of the Italian Republic (OMRI)	2002; Degree of Commander

- Recipient of the International Association of Chiefs of Police (IACP) Civil Rights Award in Law
- Top Choice Award for Leadership (2005), voted by Italian-Canadians in Toronto, Ontario
- April 14, 2005, he was presented the Key to the City of Toronto by Mayor David Miller.
- Received a star on the Italian Walk of Fame in Toronto, Ontario, Canada in 2009.
- He was Sworn in as a Member of the Queen's Privy Council for Canada on 4 January 2011. Giving Him the Right to the Honorific Prefix "The Honourable" and the Post Nominal Letters "PC" for Life.
- He Received the Honorary degree of Doctor of Laws from Assumption University on 10 May 2013.

28th Canadian Ministry (2006–2015) – Cabinet of Stephen Harper
Cabinet posts (4)
Predecessor	Office	Successor
new post	Minister of State (Seniors); 2010–2011	Alice Wong
vacant _{last held by Mauril Bélanger 2004–2006}	Associate Minister of National Defence; 2011–2012	Bernard Valcourt
Bev Oda	Minister of International Cooperation; 2012–2013	Christian Paradis
Steven Blaney	Minister of Veterans Affairs; 2013–2015	Erin O'Toole
