= Brad Blair =

Canadian politician

Brad Blair OOM

Interim Commissioner of the Ontario Provincial Police
- In office November 3, 2018 – December 16, 2018
- Preceded by: Vince Hawkes
- Succeeded by: Gary J. Couture (interim)

Personal details
- Education: University of Windsor, BA (Sociology)
- Occupation: Police officer

Bradley W. Blair OOM was a Deputy Commissioner of the Ontario Provincial Police, and he served as the Interim Commissioner from November 3 to December 16, 2018. He led the OPP following the retirement of Vince Hawkes in November 2018 and then returned to his original position once Gary J. Couture became the Interim Commissioner on December 17, 2018.

He was dismissed by the Conservative government of Doug Ford March 4, 2019.

== Life and career ==
Blair obtained a sociology degree from the University of Windsor, and he joined the OPP in 1986. He worked his way up from Constable in rural and northern Ontario, serving in detachments including Sioux Lookout, Red Lake and Chatham.

=== Deputy Commissioner and Interim Commissioner ===
In December 2013, Blair was named Deputy Commissioner and Provincial Commander of Traffic Safety and Operational Support. After the retirement of Commissioner Hawkes in November 2018, Blair became the Interim Commissioner. Blair along with Ron Taverner was a candidate for the permanent job appointment as OPP Commissioner.

After the committee's selection of Ron Taverner as the new OPP Commissioner, Blair submitted a request for the Ontario Ombudsman to investigate concerns regarding the appointment of Ron Taverner as the new OPP Commissioner. Deputy Commissioner (Field Operations) Gary J. Couture was then appointed as the Interim Commissioner. He assumed that role on December 17, 2018, with Blair returning to his previous position as Deputy Commissioner and Provincial Commander for Traffic Safety and Operational Support.

Blair, currently in the position of Deputy Commissioner of the OPP retained controversial, human rights lawyer, Julian Falconer to notify the Premier of his intent to sue based on remarks which Blair feels impugn his character. The remarks relate to Brad Blair's possible failure to maintain the confidentiality of information he obtained as OPP Commissioner, said confidentiality being a legal obligation of all employees of the Province.

On March 4, 2019, the Conservative government of Doug Ford relieved Blair of his position. Blair was fired for releasing confidential OPP information in a letter to the ombudsman, a breach of his oath as the force's deputy commissioner. This is all amid a number of controversies related to Ford's actions, including the appointment of Ford's long-time friend Ron Taverner as OPP Commissioner and the procurement of a specially-appointed vehicle for Ford's use. On September 13, 2019, Blair has filed a $15-million lawsuit for wrongful termination against Premier Doug Ford and calls for public inquiry.

== Awards ==
- Officer of the Order of Merit of the Police Forces (OOM)
- Police Exemplary Service Medal

Preceded by Vince Hawkes	Interim Commissioner of the Ontario Provincial Police; November 3, 2018 – December 16, 2018	Succeeded by Gary J. Couture (interim)
