= Gwen Boniface =

Canadian Senator

The Honourable Gwen Boniface COM OOnt

Canadian Senator from Ontario
- In office November 10, 2016 – November 15, 2025
- Nominated by: Justin Trudeau
- Appointed by: David Johnston

Commissioner of the Ontario Provincial Police
- In office May 28, 1998 – October 2006
- Preceded by: Thomas Bernard O'Grady
- Succeeded by: Julian Fantino

Personal details
- Born: August 5, 1955 (age 71)
- Party: Independent Senators Group
- Profession: Police officer; lawyer; Senator

Gwenneth (Gwen) M. Boniface COM OOnt (born August 5, 1955) is a Canadian politician who represented Ontario in the Senate of Canada from November 10, 2016 until November 15, 2025, sitting as a member of the Independent Senators Group (ISG). A former lawyer and police officer, she was the commissioner of the Ontario Provincial Police (OPP) from 1998 to 2006. Boniface was appointed to the Senate was announced by Prime Minister Justin Trudeau on October 31, 2016. Boniface is the first woman to serve as OPP commissioner.

== Education ==
Boniface earned a Certificate in Law and Security Administration from Humber College in 1977. She earned a Bachelor of Arts degree from York University in 1982 and a Bachelor of Laws degree at Osgoode Hall Law School in 1988.

== Career ==
Boniface joined the OPP in 1977 as a provincial constable before being called to the bar in 1990.

Boniface was Superintendent-Director of the OPP in the First Nations and Contract Policing Branch from 1993 to 1995.

Boniface served in the Law Commission of Canada from 1997 to 2002.

Boniface was the Chief Superintendent Regional Commander for the OPP in Western Ontario from 1996 to 1998. In 1998, she was named Commissioner of the OPP by the government of Mike Harris. She is the first woman to hold this position.

Boniface is also the first female President of the Canadian Association of Chiefs of Police, and the first Canadian to hold the Vice Chair of the Division of State and Provincial Police of the International Association of Chiefs of Police.

Boniface stepped down as OPP commissioner in October 2006 to accept an advisory position with the Irish Garda Síochána (police force).

=== As Senator ===
On October 31, 2016, the appointment of Boniface to the Senate of Canada was announced by Justin Trudeau. She sits as an independent member.

In March 2022 Boniface was appointed one of three co-chairs of the Special Joint Committee on the Declaration of Emergency following the events of the Freedom Convoy earlier that year.

== Awards ==
Boniface was invested into the Order of Ontario in 2001 for her work with the First Nations communities. She is a Commander of the Order of Merit of the Police Forces, the Order of St. John, and has the Humber College Alumnus of Distinction Award.

| Preceded by Thomas O'Grady | Commissioner of the Ontario Provincial Police; 1998-2006 | Succeeded by Julian Fantino |
