= Michael Duheme =

25th Commissioner of the Royal Canadian Mounted Police

Michael Duheme COM

25th Commissioner of the Royal Canadian Mounted Police
- Incumbent
- Assumed office March 17, 2023
- Minister: Marco Mendicino; Dominic LeBlanc; David McGuinty
- Preceded by: Brenda Lucki

Personal details
- Born: Chambly, Canada
- Occupation: Police Officer

Michael Robert Duheme COM is the 25th Commissioner of Royal Canadian Mounted Police, having taken office in an interim capacity, following the retirement of Commissioner Brenda Lucki on March 17, 2023, and permanently as of the Change of Command ceremony held on May 25, 2023.

By virtue of his role, Duheme is the ex-officio Principal Commander of the Order of Merit of the Police Forces.

== Police career ==
In 1988, he joined the Royal Canadian Mounted Police (RCMP). Throughout his career, he has served in four provinces across Canada, and internationally on a Kosovo peacekeeping mission. He has been a member of the RCMP's Emergency Response Team, a VIP personal protection officer, and Operations Commander for the Francophone Summit.

In 2015, he was appointed Officer in Charge of Parliamentary Protective Services, and he became the first Director of the Parliamentary Protective Service. In 2016, he became Commanding Officer of the National Division. He also served as Deputy Commissioner of Federal Policing.

In March 2023, Duheme was appointed interim RCMP Commissioner following the retirement of Brenda Lucki. He was permanently appointed to the position in May during a ceremony at the Salaberry Armoury in Gatineau.

== Awards and decorations ==
Commander of the Order of Merit of the Police Forces (COM)	2023
Canadian Peacekeeping Service Medal	Unknown
Interim Administration Mission in Kosovo Medal	Unknown
Queen Elizabeth II Golden Jubilee Medal	2002
Queen Elizabeth II Diamond Jubilee Medal	2012
Royal Canadian Mounted Police Long Service Medal	2008
