= Bob Paulson (police commissioner) =

23rd Commissioner of the Royal Canadian Mounted Police

Bob Paulson COM
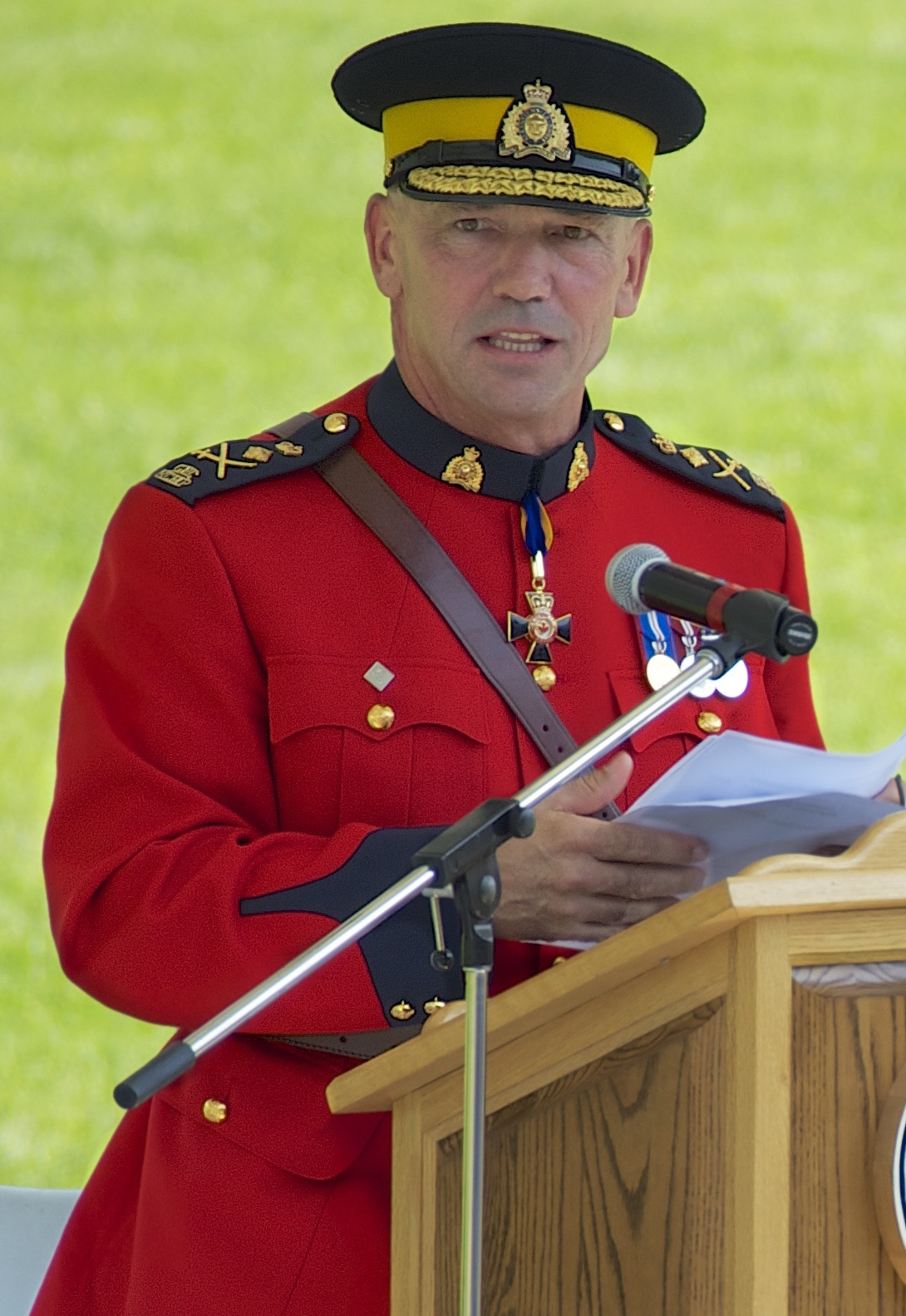
- Paulson speaking at the opening of the 65th Glengarry Highland Games in 2012

23rd Commissioner of the Royal Canadian Mounted Police
- In office November 21, 2011 – June 30, 2017
- Minister: Vic Toews; Steven Blaney; Ralph Goodale
- Preceded by: William Elliott
- Succeeded by: Dan Dubeau (acting)

Personal details
- Born: Robert Wilfred Paulson; 1958 (age 67–68) Lachute, Quebec, Canada
- Children: 4
- Education: Simon Fraser University
- Occupation: Police, Member of Canadian Forces

Robert Wilfred Paulson, COM (born 1958) is a former Commissioner of the Royal Canadian Mounted Police. He retired from the RCMP at the end of June 2017.

== Life and career ==
Paulson was born in Lachute, Quebec in 1958. His father was an Icelandic Canadian from Winnipeg and his mother was French Canadian. Growing up, he was a member of Cadets Canada. Paulson's older brother was a Commissioned Officer in the Royal Canadian Navy.

=== RCAF career (1975–1984) ===
Paulson joined the Royal Canadian Air Force as a Pilot after high school, serving from 1977 to 1984. He worked as a flight instructor and aviation administrator at CFB Moose Jaw and CFB North Bay. He left the Canadian Forces in 1984.

=== RCMP career (1986–2017) ===
Following his military career, Paulson spent two years at Simon Fraser University in Burnaby and then joined the Royal Canadian Mounted Police as a Cadet in 1986. Paulson's first posting was to the Chilliwack RCMP Detachment. He spent the next 19 years in various RCMP postings in British Columbia before being transferred to National Headquarters in Ottawa. Paulson was the driving force behind Operation E-Pandora against the Hells Angels East End Vancouver chapter. In 2006 Paulson told the journalists William Marsden and Julian Sher: "The East End chapter is the most senior, the most powerful. If we were successful in taking them out, that's where we would have the most impact on their operations". As part of E-Pandora, in October 2003 Paulson signed on the behalf of the RCMP the contract with the informer Michael Plante.

From November 2010 to November 2011, Paulson served as the Deputy Commissioner for Federal Policing.

On 21 November 2011 Paulson was promoted to Commissioner, one month following the release of his predecessor's recommendations about the Mayerthorpe killing spree.

In December 2013 Paulson refused to comment on proposed changes to the way police deal with marijuana offences. He was quoted as saying "I'm a simple country cop, you know? I'm in the business of policing and others are in the business of policy and law". However, the following year he opined "The people that use drugs are not the people we got to be bothering, right? We've got to be sort of helping them."

As per RCMP memo RCMP Paulson retired on 30 June 2017, one week before his glacial rollout of the C8 carbine was the crux in the Canadian Labour Code trial of the RCMP over the 2015 Bourque killing spree. The result of the trial was the conviction of the organization led by Paulson for close to seven years.

== Awards ==
| Commander of the Order of Merit of the Police Forces (COM) | 2012 |
| Queen Elizabeth II Golden Jubilee Medal | 2002 |
| Queen Elizabeth II Diamond Jubilee Medal | 2012 |
| Royal Canadian Mounted Police Long Service Medal | 2006 |

== Books ==
- Sher, Julian; Marsden, William (2006). Angels of Death: Inside the Bikers' Empire of Crime. Toronto: Alfred Knopf Canada. ISBN 9780307370327.
