= Christopher Lewis =

Christopher Lewis may refer to:

- Christopher Lewis (priest) (born 1944), former Dean of Christ Church, Oxford
- Christopher Lewis (screenwriter) (1944–2021) American writer and film producer
- Christopher Lewis (tennis) (born 1956), American tennis player
- Christopher D. Lewis (born 1957), Ontario police officer
- Christopher John Lewis (1964–1997), New Zealander who attempted to assassinate Queen Elizabeth II
- Christopher Gwynne Lewis (1895–1963), Welsh Anglican priest
- Christopher A. Lewis, former Secretary of the Commonwealth of Pennsylvania

== See also ==
- Chris Lewis (disambiguation)
