= Dan Dubeau =

Canadian police commissioner

Chief Human Resources Officer of the Royal Canadian Mounted Police
- Incumbent
- Assumed office October 24, 2011
- Minister: Ralph Goodale; Steven Blaney; Vic Toews

Commissioner of the Royal Canadian Mounted Police
- Acting
- In office June 30, 2017 – April 16, 2018
- Minister: Ralph Goodale
- Preceded by: Bob Paulson
- Succeeded by: Brenda Lucki

Personal details
- Born: Bonnyville, Alberta, Canada
- Education: Athabasca University
- Occupation: Police Officer

Daniel Dubeau is the chief human resources officer and deputy commissioner of the Royal Canadian Mounted Police. He was its acting commissioner following Bob Paulson's retirement in June 2017, until Brenda Lucki replaced him in April 2018.

== Awards ==
Dubeau received the following medals during his policing career:

Queen Elizabeth II Diamond Jubilee Medal	2001
Royal Canadian Mounted Police Long Service Medal	2001
