= Vince Hawkes =

Canadian police officer

Vince Hawkes COM

14th Commissioner of the Ontario Provincial Police
- In office March 29, 2014 – November 2, 2018
- Preceded by: Christopher D. Lewis
- Succeeded by: Brad Blair (interim)

Personal details
- Born: c. 1961 (age 56)
- Education: University of Ottawa (BSc); University of Toronto
- Occupation: Police commissioner

Joseph Vincent Nicholas Hawkes COM is a Canadian police officer who served as the 14th commissioner of the Ontario Provincial Police from March 29, 2014 to November 2, 2018.

== Life and career ==
Hawkes is a native of Hull, Quebec, and he joined the OPP in 1984. He attended the University of Ottawa (graduating with a Bachelor of Science degree) and later the University of Toronto's Rotman School of Management (Police Leadership Program). Hawkes is also a graduate of the international Leadership in Counter Terrorism program.

He became Deputy Commissioner for Investigations and Organized Crime in 2006, and Deputy Commissioner for Field Operations in 2010.

=== Commissioner ===
Hawkes assumed command of the OPP on March 29, 2014, taking over from Christopher D. Lewis. In September 2018, Hawkes announced that November 2, 2018, would be his last day as Commissioner, since he would be retiring.

== Awards ==
- Commander of the Order of Merit of the Police Forces (COM), 2016, previously Officer (OOM), 2010
- Police Exemplary Service Medal
- Queen Elizabeth II Diamond Jubilee Medal
- Honorary doctorate of letters, Nipissing University

Preceded by Christopher D. Lewis	Commissioner of the Ontario Provincial Police; March 29, 2014 – November 2, 2018	Succeeded by Brad Blair (interim)
