= Thomas Carrique =

Thomas Carrique may refer to:

- Thomas Carrique (police officer), Canadian police commissioner
- Thomas Carrique (footballer) (born 1999), French footballer
