= Chris Lewis =

Chris Lewis may refer to:

- Chris Lewis (tennis) (born 1957), New Zealand retired professional tennis player
- Chris Lewis (footballer) (born 1969), Aboriginal Australian rules footballer with the West Coast Eagles
- Chris Lewis (cricketer) (born 1968), England former international and county cricketer
- Chris Lewis (Usenet) (active from 2002), Canadian Internet authority
- Christopher D. Lewis (born 1957), also known as Chris Lewis, Ontario Provincial Police commissioner
- Chris Lewis (Canadian politician) (born 1976), Canadian MP
- Christopher Lewis (tennis) (born 1992), also known as Chris Lewis, American tennis player
- Chris Lewis (rugby league) (born 1991), rugby league player for the Melbourne Storm
- Chris Lewis (sportscaster) (born 1956), American play by play commentator for CBS Sports
- Chris Lewis (American politician) (born 1979), Kentucky politician
- Chris Lewis (American football) (born 1980), American football player

== See also ==
- Chris Louis (born 1969), speedway rider
- Christopher Lewis (disambiguation)
