= Victor Williams (Canadian Army officer) =

Canadian general (1867–1949)

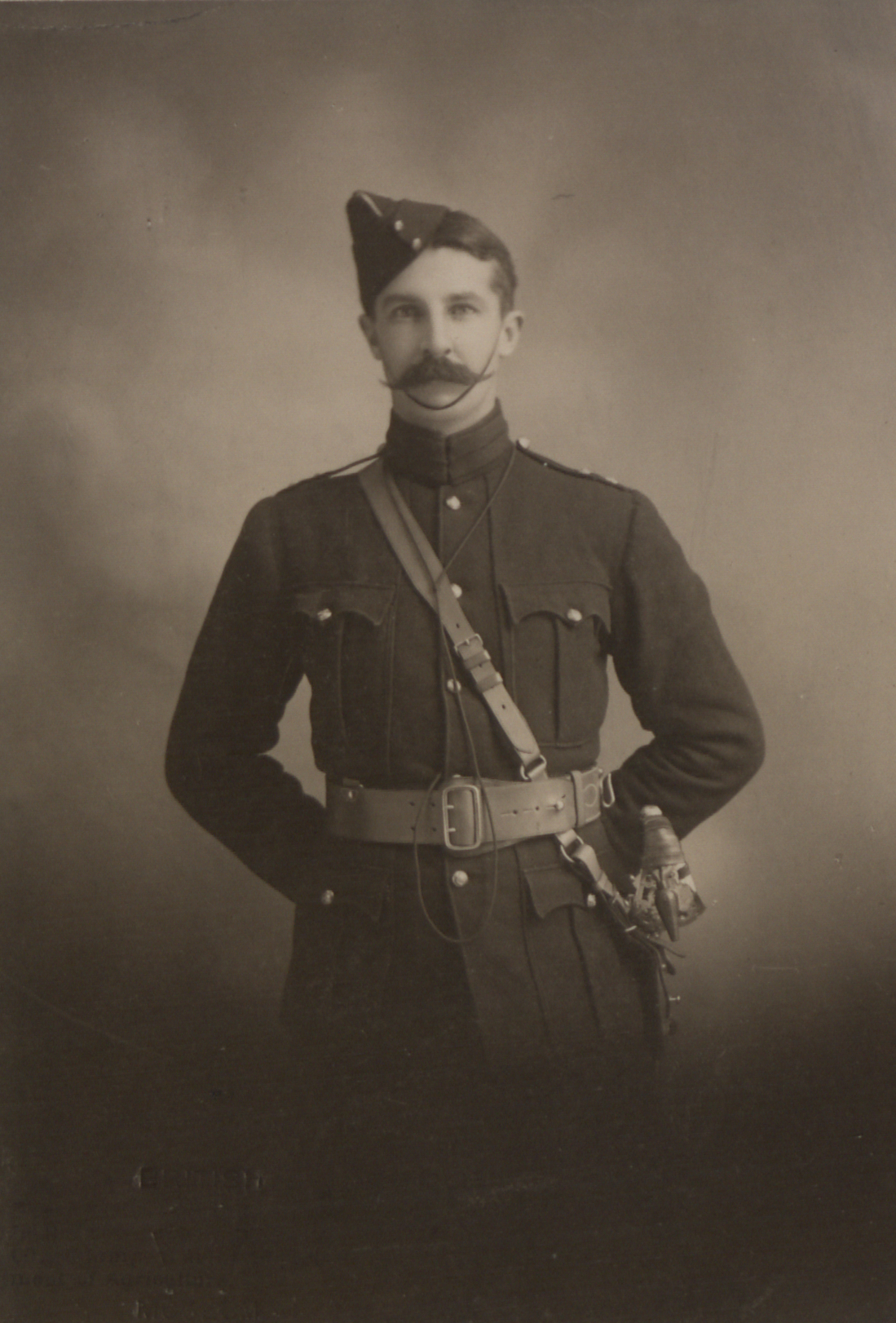
- Williams c. 1899
- Born: Victor Arthur Seymour Williams; 1867; Port Hope, Ontario
- Died: December 12, 1949 (aged 81–82); Toronto, Ontario, Canada
- Relatives: John Tucker Williams; Arthur Trefusis Heneage Williams; Williams family of Caerhays and Burncoose
- Military career
- Branch: North-West Mounted Police
- Service years: 1886-1939
- Rank: Commissioner; Major-General
- Service number: 317483
- Unit: Canadian Mounted Rifles
- Commands: Second Boer War, Commissioner of the Ontario Provincial Police
- Conflicts: Battle of Mont Sorrel
- Awards: Order of St. Michael and St. George
- Other work: Commissioner of the Ontario Provincial Police

Major-General Victor Arthur Seymour Williams CMG (1867 – December 12, 1949) was a Canadian general in the First World War and later the Commissioner of the Ontario Provincial Police. In June 1916 he was seriously wounded and captured by the Germans. He was one of the highest ranked Canadians ever made a prisoner of war.

== Early life and education ==
Williams was born at Port Hope, Ontario, in 1867, the son of Arthur Trefusis Heneage Williams, by his wife Emily, daughter of Benjamin Seymour. After attending Trinity College School in Port Hope, he entered the Royal Military College of Canada, Kingston, Ontario, in 1884. In 1886, “Williams was one of four new Inspectors who had attended the Royal Military College in Kingston. The other three officers were: S.T. Wood, P.C.H. Primrose, and T.W. Chalmers." Two years into his studies he was withdrawn from the college at his parents' request and entered service in the North-West Mounted Police. In December 1887 he was gazetted an inspector.

== Army career ==
He transferred to the Mounted Infantry in 1889. He married Helen Euphemia Sutherland on October 23, 1890. He eventually took a commission with the Royal Canadian Dragoons in 1893. In 1899 he went to South Africa, serving as a major and lieutenant-colonel in command of 'B' Squadron of the Canadian Mounted Rifles during the Second Boer War.

Williams was promoted brevet colonel for his overseas service and appointed commandant of the Royal School of Cavalry in Toronto, Ontario. In 1907 he was appointed commanding officer of the Royal Canadian Dragoons and Inspector of Cavalry for the Dominion of Canada. In 1911 he commanded the mounted units at the Coronation of King George V. From 1912 to 1914 he was Adjutant-General at Ottawa. He commanded Valcartier Camp, Quebec, during the mobilization of the 1st Canadian Division and accompanied the contingent overseas. During the war he served on the general staffs of Field Marshal Sir John French and the British II and III Corps.

He commanded the 8th Canadian Infantry Brigade of the 3rd Canadian Division from 23 December 1915 and was granted the temporary rank of brigadier-general while employed in this role. He was mentioned in despatches on 30 April 1916 for gallant and distinguished services in the field. He was severely wounded and taken prisoner on 3 June, during the Battle of Mont Sorrel. He was released in a prisoner exchange before the end of the war.

He returned to Canada in late 1918. After the war, he was promoted major-general in command of Military District 2 based in Toronto. He then commanded military districts in Kingston and Toronto. He served as the Commissioner of the Ontario Provincial Police from 1922 to 1939. He died in Sunnybrook Hospital, Toronto on December 12, 1949, and was buried in the St. John's Cemetery in Port Hope.

== Recognition and honours ==
Mount Williams (2730 metres) in the Canadian Rockies on the border of Alberta and British Columbia was named in his honour in 1918. He was appointed Companion of the Order of St Michael and St George (CMG) in January 1920 for his war service.
