= Mount Williams (Canada) =

Mountain in Alberta and British Columbia, Canada

- Location within Alberta Location within British Columbia Location within Canada

Highest point
- Elevation: 2,741 m (8,993 ft)
- Prominence: 106 m (348 ft)
- Listing: Mountains of Alberta; Mountains of British Columbia
- Coordinates: 50°43′06″N 115°21′49″W

Geography
- Location: Alberta / British Columbia
- Parent range: Park Ranges
- Topo map: NTS 82J11 Kananaskis Lakes

Climbing
- First ascent: 1922
- Easiest route

Mount Williams is located on the border of Alberta and British Columbia on the Continental Divide. It was named in 1918 after Major General Arthur Victor Seymour Williams CMG.

== See also ==
- List of peaks on the Alberta–British Columbia border
