= Commissioner of the Ontario Provincial Police =

- Incumbent; Thomas Carrique since June 6, 2019
- Ontario Provincial Police
- Reports to: Solicitor General
- Appointer: Lieutenant Governor in Council
- Term length: At His Majesty's pleasure
- Constituting instrument: Police Services Act; Provincial Police Force Act
- Formation: 1921
- First holder: Harry Macintyre Cawthra-Elliot
- Website: opp.ca

The commissioner of the Ontario Provincial Police (French: commissaire de la Police provinciale de l'Ontario) is the professional head of the Ontario Provincial Police (OPP). The commissioner is responsible for the management and administration of the OPP operations.

Thomas Carrique has been the 15th commissioner of the OPP since 6 June 2019.

== History ==
=== Pre-OPP ===
In May 1875, the first head of a provincial police force was John Wilson Murray, who was a provincial constable appointed to the position of "Detective for the Province of Ontario". Murray was joined by two detectives under his command, Joseph Edwin Rogers in 1884 and William D. Greer in 1887. By 1887 Murray became Chief Inspector with Rogers and Greer becoming Inspectors.

=== Creation of OPP ===
Chief Detective Murray died in 1906, and in 1909, the Ontario Provincial Police Force was formally created. It consisted of 45 constables under the direction of Superintendent Joseph E. Rogers, who began as a detective under Murray in 1884.

In 1921, the force was reorganized as the OPP with the passage of the Provincial Police Force Act. Major General Harry Macintyre Cawthra-Elliot was appointed to the newly created position of Commissioner. In 1922, Joseph E. Rogers was dismissed from the force by Victor Williams, thus ending his tenure as the head of the OPP.

Since 1939, most OPP Commissioners have been police officers (Eric Silk was a civilian) and some (12 up to 2018) promoted from current or former members of the OPP.

== List of OPP Commissioners ==
Years served	Name	Notes
1921–1922	Major General Harry Macintyre Cawthra-Elliot (1867–1949)	Cawthra-Elliot was a career military officer and married into the Cawthra family.
1922–1939	Major General Victor Williams (1867–1949)	Williams was the second career military officer to head the OPP; he was previously an Inspector with the North-West Mounted Police.
1939–1953	William H. Stringer (1886–1953)	Stringer was a career OPP officer, the first to be promoted within the force.
1953–1958	Edwin V. McNeill (1896–1962)	McNeill was an OPP Inspector and served briefly as interim Windsor Police Chief.
1958–1963	Wilfred Hamilton Clark (1904-1971)	Clark was a career OPP officer, including Inspector of Criminal Investigation Branch.
1963–1973	Eric Hamilton Silk, QC (1908–2004)	Silk was the first civilian head of the OPP; he was a career civil servant (counsel with the Office of the Attorney General of Ontario).
1973–1981	Harold Hopkins Graham (1916–2001)	Graham was a career officer with the OPP, formerly Inspector, Assistant Commissioner and Deputy Commissioner.
1981–1983	James Laird Erskine (1916–2005)	Erskine was former head of the OPP fraud squad and Deputy Commissioner.
1983–1988	Robert Archibald "Archie" Ferguson	Ferguson was a 37-year OPP veteran (1951–1988).
1988–1998	Thomas Bernard O'Grady (1936-2024)	O'Grady was a 36-year veteran of the OPP (1962–1998).
1998–2006	Gwen Boniface	Boniface was a career OPP officer (21-year veteran and promoted from Chief Superintendent Regional Commander); she joined Ireland's Garda Síochána Inspectorate (National Police Force) as an advisor in 2006.
2006–2010	Julian Fantino	Fantino was a Metro Toronto Police veteran; he later served as Chief of Police of the London Police Service, York Region Police and Toronto Police Service; also head of Emergency Measures Ontario (as Deputy Minister).
2010–2014	Christopher D. Lewis	Lewis was an OPP veteran who joined the force in 1978 and was promoted from the rank of Deputy Commissioner (Field Operations).
2014–2018	Vince Hawkes	Hawkes joined the OPP in 1984 and is a former Deputy Commissioner (Field Operations).
2018	Brad Blair	Interim Commissioner from November 3 to December 16, 2018. He joined the OPP in 1986, and he became Deputy Commissioner (Traffic Safety and Operational Support) in December 2013.
2018–2019	Gary J. Couture	Couture served as Interim Commissioner from December 17, 2018, to April 7, 2019. He joined the OPP in 1985 and became Deputy Commissioner (Field Operations) in April 2014.
2019–present	Thomas Carrique	Carrique became the 15th Commissioner on April 8, 2019. He was previously Deputy Chief of York Regional Police, where he began his policing career in 1990.
