= Christopher D. Lewis =

Christopher D. Lewis COM

13th Commissioner of the Ontario Provincial Police
- In office November 29, 2010 – March 29, 2014
- Preceded by: Julian Fantino
- Succeeded by: Vince Hawkes

Personal details
- Born: 1957 (age 68–69) Sault Ste. Marie, Ontario, Canada
- Spouse: Angie Howe

Christopher D. Lewis COM (born 1957) was a career police officer and former Commissioner of the Ontario Provincial Police. He retired from the position on March 29, 2014.

== Early career ==
Born in Sault Ste. Marie, Ontario, Lewis has been with the Ontario Provincial Police since 1978. His first posting was as a constable in Kapuskasing, Ontario. He was promoted through the ranks.

== Deputy Commissioner ==
He was appointed Deputy Commissioner of Field Operations by Fantino effective January 1, 2007. As Deputy Commissioner, Lewis oversaw the creation of the OPP's aboriginal policing bureau and has studied aboriginal government and law. He has been in charge of the OPP's operation managing the conflict between Native protesters and non-Native residents in Caledonia throughout his tenure as deputy commissioner.

== Commissioner ==
Lewis' appointment was announced in July 2010 and became effective on August 1.

== Education ==
Lewis is a graduate of the FBI Academy in Quantico, Virginia, as well as of a course in Homicide from the Harvard Associates in Police Science Homicide, Aboriginal Government and Law program at Athabasca University and is also a graduate of the Applied Management program at Northwood University.

== Family ==
Lewis is married to OPP Chief Superintendent (Field Support Bureau and formerly Central Region) Angie Howe. He has two adult daughters with his ex-wife.

== Career highlights ==
- Officer, Smooth Rock Falls Detachment
- Officer, London Detachment
- Tactics and Rescue Unit.
- Commander of Eastern Region
- Commander of the Investigation, Investigation Support
- Commander of Information and Technology Services Bureau
- Commander of Emergency Management Bureau.

== Awards ==
- Order of Merit of the Police Forces - Officer and later as Commander of the Order
- Queen Elizabeth II Golden Jubilee Medal
- Queen Elizabeth II Diamond Jubilee Medal
- Police Exemplary Service Medal

Preceded by Julian Fantino	Commissioner of the Ontario Provincial Police; November 29, 2010-March 28, 2014	Succeeded by Vince Hawkes
