= Shawn Brant =

Canadian Mohawk activist

Shawn Brant is a Native activist who lives on the Tyendinaga Mohawk Territory, Ontario, Canada. He has been involved in direct action struggles for Native land rights, in conflict with Ontario provincial authorities.

In the 1990s, Brant participated in protests at Oka and Ipperwash. In January 2007, Brant was arrested for uttering death threats to members of the Canadian military who had been present at the November protest. On April 14, 2008, Brant was acquitted of all charges.

In April 2007, he organized a 30-hour blockade of a CN rail line in eastern Ontario. After this time the Ontario police guaranteed immunity to the protestors in exchange for ending the protest. The offer was accepted, and the protest ended without arrest or injury. On April 25, Ontario Provincial Police Commissioner Julian Fantino issued a warrant for Brant’s arrest.

In June 2007, the Mohawks of Tyendinaga blockaded CN lines and highways running through Mohawk land near Deseronto, Ontario. Brant participated as a Mohawk spokesperson as part of the National Aboriginal Day of Action on June 29, 2007. Brant was charged with nine counts of mischief and breach of bail conditions. He turned himself in on July 5 and was denied bail. Denied bail again on August 10, Brant was finally released on August 30 with a $50,000 bond and a $50,000 surety. The courts have consistently denied Brant the right to associate with Tyendinaga protests.

On April 25, 2008, Brant was again arrested and detained for assault and weapons charges in relation to a confrontation between two men from Deseronto – James Lalonde and Mike Lalonde – and several aboriginal protesters.

On May 27, 2008, Brant was put on lockdown for 23 hours a day for 12 days for misconduct and breaking the prison rules. He was illegally burning sage in his cell as part of a Mohawk religious ceremony.

In 2008, Brant was found to have sold land that didn't belong to him but belonged to the Tyendinaga Mohawk Territory.

On June 7, 2009, Brant helped organize a blockade of the Skyway bridge which connects Tyendinaga with Prince Edward County. He was imprisoned for almost three years.

On November 1, 2013, Brant announced he was running for elected chief of Tyendinaga Mohawk Territory. He was unsuccessful in his attempt, coming in second to Donald Maracle.

As of 2020, Brant is a Tyendinaga pot shop owner.

== See also ==
- Mohawk nation
- Tyendinaga Mohawk Territory, Ontario
