= Michael Plante =

Canadian police informer (born 1967)

Michael Dollard Plante (born 6 January 1967) was a police informer within the Hells Angels East End Vancouver chapter. His story was chronicled in the best-selling 2011 book Hell To Pay by the journalist Neal Hall.

== Informer ==
Plante was born in North Vancouver, the son of a teacher. He grew up in Vancouver, Revelstoke, Powell River, Chilliwack, New Westminster, and Burnaby. He graduated from Cariboo Hill secondary school in Burnaby in 1986. In 1990–1991, he studied criminology at Douglas College. He often applied to the Vancouver Police Department, but was always turned down. Plante claims to have been inspired into becoming an informer within the ranks of the Hells Angels by reading the 1996 book Into the Abyss by Yves Lavigne, which is a biography of Anthony Tait.

Plante lived in the Lower Mainland of British Columbia, where he worked as a bouncer while engaging in bodybuilding. Plante worked part-time as a competitive bodybuilder and could bench-press 400 pounds. Plante had no criminal record, but had once been charged with assault. He worked at the bar at the North Burnaby Inn in Burnaby owned by the Hells Angel Robert "Bob" Green. Alarmed at the way that the bar was a front for organized crime, Plante moved to Medicine Hat, but returned to the Lower Mainland when he found things were no different in Alberta with the bars there being used by the Hells Angels. Initially, he worked in a warehouse for Costco, but returned to working in bars for financial reasons owing to the high cost of living in the Lower Mainland. He worked in a series of bars such as the Dell Hotel, the Marble Arch, and the Cecil Hotel which all used by the Hells Angels for their criminal activities. At the Cecil Hotel owned by the Hells Angel Randy Potts, Plante worked as a "mule" smuggling cocaine and cash for the Hells Angels.

Plante had ties with the East End Vancouver chapter of the Hells Angels, which was the most powerful Hells Angels chapter in western Canada. The East End chapter, which was founded in 1983, is considered to be one of the richest Hells Angels chapters in the entire world, and prior to Plante agreeing to work as an informer, police operations against the East End chapter had consistently failed. In the 1980s-1990s, 60% of all criminal cases against the Hells Angels of the East End chapter had ended with the acquittal of the accused. The Royal Canadian Mounted Police officer Bob Paulson told the journalists William Marsden and Julian Sher: "The East End chapter is the most senior, the most powerful. If we were successful in taking them out, that's where we would have the most impact on their operations". The president of the East End chapter was John Bryce who along with his half-brother, the chapter sergeant-at-arms Lloyd "Louie" Robinson (the two men have the same mother, but different fathers) dominated the chapter. Bryce owned a $600, 000 house in Burnaby plus three more houses with a total value of $2 million in the Lower Mainland. Robinson had no job or known source of income, but lived in a condo worth $1 million in West Vancouver. Through Potts, Plante came to know Robinson and served as his "spotter" at the gym where the two men worked out. Robinson recruited Plante to work as an "enforcer" for the Hells Angels whose task to threaten or beat up people along with the promise that he might eventually be permitted to join the Hells Angels. In a sign of favor, Plante in 2002 was first permitted to visit the clubhouse of the East End chapter. In late 2002, Plante first met Bryce and another Hells Angel leader, Gino Zumpano.

Potts was a "prospect" (the second level in an outlaw biker club) and in November 2002, he was beaten up by his enemy Audey Hanson. Most damaging for Potts, Hanson stole his bikers vest with the Hells Angel half-patch. Potts brought along Plante for moral support when met his sponsor, the "full patch" Hells Angel Lloyd "Louie" Robinsonn, to explain that his bikers vest had been stolen. Furious, Robinson slapped Potts across the face and beat him up. Robinson told Potts that he would have to get his Hells Angels vest back or be expelled from the Hells Angels. Potts recruited Plante into a scheme to retrieve the stolen vest and the two men took to watching Hanson's house. In January 2003, Potts gave Plante an Uzi submachine gun and a .38 handgun. Potts told Plante that he wanted him to kill Hanson, not just get back the stolen vest. Plante later commented that having him murder Hanson would limit if not eliminate altogether the legal liability for Potts. Plante and Potts broke into Hanson's house to get back the vest, but Plante intentionally missed when he opened fire on Hanson. Potts was angry that Plante had failed to kill Hanson and told him that he expected him to try again.

Appalled at the prospect of becoming a murderer, especially since the issue at stake was merely a leather bikers vest, Plante contacted the Royal Canadian Mounted Police (RCMP) and stated he wanted to become an informer. In May 2003, Plante was ordered by Robinson to look after his son, Lloyd "Lloydsie" Robinson Jr, who was living on bail after being charged with assault. Robinson ordered Plante to drive his son out to Penticton in the Okanagan valley to hide him, but Plante called the Crime Stoppers phone line along the way to tell the police where the younger Robinson was hiding. Plante stated that he had been ordered by another Hells Angels, David Patrick O'Hara, to bring a businessman, James Betnar, to O'Hara's Surrey home where Betnar was beaten for 15 minutes. According to Plante, O'Hara then told him: "Take him back to Vancouver and get $20,000 from him." After his release from the Surrey Pretrial Center where he had held on charges of extortion and assault in July 2003, Plante contacted the Mountie Douglas Collins about becoming an informer. Plante told Collins: "I am on the verge of becoming a Hells Angel. I work out with Louie Robinson. You have got my wallet. You have seen that I have a club card with all the contacts on it for East End. I am offering you something better – full infiltration."

== Operation E-Pandora ==
Plante worked for the RCMP for an operation codenamed E-Pandora. The intention behind Operation E-Pandora was to gather enough evidence to expose the Hells Angels as a criminal syndicate that merely posed as a motorcycle club. Starting in July 2003, Plante met with his police handlers in a van near his apartment in New Westminster. Plante later told Kim Bolan, the crime correspondent of the Vancouver Sun newspaper: "“There was really nothing going on. Everything is pretty quiet. I am actually meeting more with the cops than I am with the Hells Angels." Lloyd "Louis" Robinson, the sergeant-at-arms of the East End chapter was angry with Plante for being arrested and for abandoning Robinson's son in Penticton. As such Plante was out of favor with the Hells Angels in the summer of 2003.

In September 2003, Plante came into Robinson's favor and he finally had information for his police handlers. Plante was sent to Montreal to threaten a witness against Robinson's son into changing his testimony. Upon his return to the Lower Mainland, Plante told Potts about a barrel of ephedrine he had access to, which could be used to make methamphetamine. Plante purchased the ephedrine from the drug dealer Wissam "Sam" Ayach and delivered it to Potts. Plante stated: "I was driving out to this place and I was dropping off first one kilo, then two kilos and then it would take maybe a day or two days to pay me. I did this non-stop from September ’03 till probably December ’03 — just from that barrel." Plante would make deliveries to Pott's mother, who lived in a trailer park in Surrey. Plante recalled: "“I would drop meth off to his mom and his mom would take the meth and she would hand me $25,000. She would say, ‘Is it all there is Michael?’ ‘Yes, Mrs. Potts, it is all there.’ She would say, ‘Do you want an apple?’ ‘No thank you.’". In the fall of 2003 Plante met in a motel room with the Mountie Bob Paulson about signing the contract to become an agent source informer. Plante described Paulson as a man who dressed colorfully wearing a leather coat and cowboy boots.

Plante became an agent source informer (an informer with a formal contact to be paid a certain sum by the police) and was paid $14, 000 Canadian dollars per month in exchange for wearing a wire. Alongside his cash payments, Plante also received free vacations to Mexico, a 1997 Mustang automobile, had the RCMP pay for his meals at restaurant with the tab often running up to $2, 000 per meal, and had the RCMP pay the lease on a Harley-Davidson motorcycle. The generous payments led for the media to later dub Plante the "million dollar rat". As part of his agent source work, Plante formally applied to join the Hells Angels and was given menial tasks to perform to test his willingness to serve the Angels. Plante did not know how to ride a motorcycle and had to take a course to learn how to ride one. In December 2003, Plante attended the party to mark the 20th anniversary of the founding of the East End chapter in December 1983. Plante remembered of the party: "I hated being around them. I hated talking to them. I hated the whole thing. All they talked about was Hells Angels — drugs, making money from drugs. It is like being around someone and all they talk about is curling. Curling, curling, curling, curling. It was so boring".

Plante explained to the RCMP that the secret of the Hells Angels hand gestures with for example a gesture that mimicked turning a car ignition key indicated that someone had a kilogram of drugs to sell. Plante primarily worked alongside Hells Angels associate Kerry Ryan Renaud who manufactured and sold methamphetamine for the "full patch" Hells Angels Johnny Punko and Ron Lising. Renaud's methamphetamine lab was located in a barn just outside of Abbotsford and Plante recorded Renaud as saying to fellow methamphetamine cooks: "This is how it's going to work. This is how we are going to make our money". Plante recorded one "prospect" Hells Angel, Jamie Holland, refuse orders to clean the toilets of the "full patch" members under the grounds: "We don't clean toilets. We're gangsters." Plante stated that the comment was taken as an insult. Plante never joined the Hells Angels as the group's rules require that a member be sponsored by a "full patch" Hells Angel who had known him for five years, which did not apply in his case.

Plante recorded Punko as telling him that the Hells Angel Gino Zumpano "took a walk" with Clayton Roueche, the leader of the United Nations gang. Plante later testified that remark meant that an important meeting had taken place between Zumpano and Roueche. Punko told Plante that United Nations who previously been the enemies of the Hells Angels were now going to become their allies. Punko further told Plante that he still disliked the United Nations and if any of their members entered the Brandi's Exotic Nightclub strip club owned by Zumpano: "If we walk in there and they're in Brandi's, they're going to get pounded out". Plante recorded that the Hells Angel David Giles, a "full patch" member of the East End chapter, had been hired by Roueche to beat up two of his drug dealers whom he suspected of stealing from his gang. In September 2004, Plante became an "official friend" of the East End chapter. Giles was recorded as joking: "You are not going to, like, become a Hells Angel and then quit and write a book about us, are you?" Plante was told by the Hells Angel Tom Gilles: "Micheal, we have a dress code. I want you to wear black jeans, black shirts, black vest."

On 6 September 2004, Plante received a phone call telling him to go to the 8 Rinks sports center in Burnaby to meet Lising and another Hells Angel associate Nima Ghavami. Upon arriving, Plante was told by Lising to deliver a pound of methamphetamine wrapped in a paper bag to the counter of a popular deli at a mall in Vancouver. The police followed Plante and covertly photographed him dropping off the methamphetamine. Later that day, Plante received a text from Lising telling him to go to a restaurant in Hope where he was to sit at a particular table and read a newspaper to meet a drug dealer from Kelowna who was to give him $10,000 in cash. Plante was ordered to write and give the drug dealer a note protesting that he used a cell phone that Lising had given him for drug deals for personal calls. The note read: "I don't care if you are calling taxis or pizzas, don't use that fucking phone!" The man from Kelowna arrived and gave Plante $5,000 dollars in cash as he claimed that he was too poor to pay the full $10,000 that he had promised. Lising sent the man a threatening text that read "Hey fuck face, that's not what you promised!" Using the information provided by Plante, the RCMP raided the house of Potts who had been promoted to a "full patch" member. In a telephone call recorded by the police, Potts told Plante to go the trailer park where his mother lived to retrieve the bag full of guns that he had hidden in his mother's trailer. Plante found that Potts had live hand grenades along with machine guns hidden at his mother's trailer, which he handed over to the police.

On 15 October 2004, Plante while working as a bouncer at the Brandi's Exotic Nightclub was badly beaten up by the professional wrestler Ion Croitoru who had joined the United Nations gang. Brandi's had become Canada's best known strip-club in 2003 when the actor Ben Affleck was said to have been given a lap-dance there by the stripper Tammy Morris, an incident that led to his fiancée Jennifer Lopez breaking off their engagement. After the Affleck incident, which was covered extensively by the international media, Brandi's became the most popular strip club in Canada and was a major tourist attraction in the Lower Mainland. While watching a stripper undress at Brandi's, Lising had become involved in a confrontation with Croitoru under the grounds that members of the UN gang were not allowed at Brandi's, leading Plante to tell Croitoru to leave. In response Croitoru attacked him and proceeded to give him a vicious beating. Plante was notably enraged that neither his supposed "brothers" in the Hells Angels nor his police handlers intervened while Croitoru had beaten him up. Plante nearly resigned as an informer as he complained that his police handlers were only interested in the information he provided, not in himself as a person.

Plante recorded a conversation with Punko about how to make $20, 000 in a hurry, and Punko told Plante to go to Alberta to sell 5 kilograms of cocaine. Punko told Plante not to mention this transaction to Bryce who would demand a share of the profits if he was aware of the cocaine deal. Plante went to Alberta and received $30, 000 from his RCMP handlers as the advance payment for the cocaine. When handing over the $30, 000 in cash to Punko, the latter was recorded as saying that his cocaine was "the best around". Plante received the five kilograms of cocaine at Punko's house, where he was told that Punko in turn receive his cocaine from "R.T. and this Chinese guy". Plante handed the cocaine over to the Mounties, whose chemists discovered that the cocaine was 84% pure and had arrived straight from Colombia. On 20 January 2005, Plante recorded the Hells Angel Jean Joseph Violette along with Bryce's son Jonathan Bryce beating up a drug dealer, Glen Louie, for using the Hells Angels name without being associated with the Hells Angels. Much to Plante's disappointment, he was not promoted up to being a "hang-around" with the Hells Angels, which would have made him an official member of the East End chapter while Jonathan Bryce was promoted up to being a "hang-around" .

The information provided by Plante gave the Mounties sufficient evidence to persuade a judge to authorize the bugging of the clubhouse of the Hells Angels East End chapter in Kelowna. Plante recorded a meeting of the executive of the East End chapter on 24 January 2005 discussing plans to establish a new chapter in Kelowna as enough Hells Angels had homes in the Okanagan Valley to justify an establishing a chapter. Plante's recordings revealed that it was the Kelowna resident David Giles who kept pressing the hardest for a chapter in Kelowna. Giles had once belonged to the Hells Angels Sherbrooke chapter before he moved to Vancouver in 1995, and was described as maintaining strong ties to both the Quebec Hells Angels and the Montreal Mafia. Plante recorded Giles as saying it was too far to drive from Kelowna to Vancouver to attend the weekly meetings of the East End chapter, and that the best solution was to establish a new chapter in Kelowna headed by himself.

== Trials and convictions ==
The operation came to an end in January 2005 when Plante testified that he could not longer handle the stress of being an informer. On 25 January 2005, Plante ceased to work as an informer. Plante stated that Jonathan Bryce was promoted up to being a "hang-around" would ensure that he now had to tell orders from him, a prospect that he found unbearable. Plante moved to another Canadian city while the Hells Angels launched a search for him. In the first half of 2005, Plante had much difficulty in readjusting to normal life and had to see a psychiatrist to assist with his return to life outside of the underworld.

On 15 July 2005, the RCMP stormed into the clubhouse of the East End chapter with warrants for the arrest of 16 Hells Angels based on the evidence collected by Plante. During the raids of Operation E-Pandora, the RCMP seized $7 million worth of illegal goods including 20 kilograms of cocaine, 20 kilograms of methamphetamine, 70 kilograms of marihuana, five handguns, 11 sticks of dynamite and two methamphetamine labs. The E-Pandora raids attracted much attention when the Mounties and Vancouver police used a pick-up truck with a battering ram attached to the front to smash down the door of the East End chapter clubhouse at 3598 East Georgia street. Bryce arrived on the scene shortly after the police had smashed their way in and was furious, swearing loudly to the reporters present that the police had just caused grievous damage to the clubhouse. In response, Constable Howard Chow told the media that it was unlikely the well known white supremacist Hells Angels would have opened the door of the clubhouse to a Chinese-Canadian policeman such as himself, which justified the use of the battering ram as the police had arrest warrants for a number of the Hells Angels inside the clubhouse. The police discovered guns at the homes of the Hells Angels. At the house of the Hells Angel Jean Violette, the police found a loaded .25-caliber Beretta handgun along with an unloaded Ruger SP 101 revolver; at the house of Johnny Punko a loaded Smith & Wesson 9-mm handgun along with a Royal Sovereign money counting machine and at the house of Ronaldo Lising a loaded .357 Rossi M877 revolver and a loaded .380 Walther PPK/S semi-automatic pistol.

Plante was paid a total of $1 million for his undercover work. The Crown was desperate for evidence to convict the members of the Hells Angels East End chapter that they were quite literally willing to pay any price for information that would provide the necessary evidence for a conviction. On the basis of the evidence collected by him, the RCMP arrested 18 men, 6 of whom were "full patch" Hells Angels. Charged on the basis of the evidence collected by Plante were the "full patch" Hells Angels David Francis Giles, John Virgil Punko, Randall Richard Potts, Jean Joseph Violette; Ronaldo Lising and Richard Conway. At the trials of the accused, Plante served as the star witness for the Crown. In 2006, Plante testified that his reasons for becoming an informer were: "Moral and ethical reasons. There was no grudge for doing what I did. The things the Hells Angels were getting away with, I didn't think it was right."

The defense lawyers for the accused noted that Plante had committed many crimes as an informer such as numerous assaults and painted him as a criminal who only turned Crown's evidence to avoid prison time. Don Morrison, the lawyer for Lising and Ghavami told Plante on 13 September 2006: ""You are not supposed to use violence. You can traffic in certain drugs and commit certain other crimes, but only after they have the approval of an exemption signed off by a senior officer in the police force involved in the investigation." Plante in turn reply that he engaged in violence under the orders of the Hells Angels. The Crown and Plante answered that he had to commit crimes to earn the trust of his Hells Angels masters. Plante stated that as a bouncer he was not legally allowed to permit someone to drive home drunk, and that there was an occasion when he was working as a bouncer at a bar that he had to order an intoxicated Ghavami not to ride his motorcycle. Plante stated that Ghavami was "acting aggressively" as he insisted that he would ride his way home, and that he was forced to "slap" around Ghavami to stop him. Morrison noted that Plante had often used steroids, which had known to induce aggression known as "roid rage", and accused him of being a steroid addict who behaved in a reckless fashion due to his alleged steroid abuse. Plante replied that he used only one steroid tablet per day and denied that had "roid rage". Morrison made much that Plante had sold methamphetamine as an undercover agent, telling Bolan: "It is not he kind of national police force I want in Canada, when they allow 60 pounds of methamphetamine to go into the Surrey community with no warnings whatsoever to the citizens". Morrison demanded that a Royal Commission be appointed to investigate Plante. At the time, Ghavami was standing next to his lawyer, and when Bolan asked him if he was a methamphetamine dealer, he told her "I guess so, yes". The Crown Attorney, Martha Devlin, defended Plante as she stated in court that under Section 25.1 of the Criminal Code of Canada Plante as a police agent informer was permitted to commit any criminal acts except murder as part of his work as an informer. Devlin told the court: "Michael Plante was committing acts at the direction of the Hells Angels, specifically the East End chapter of the Hells Angels. What we see from the investigation conducted by the RCMP is that it's not the RCMP who consider themselves above the law, but members of the East End chapter of the Hells Angels who consider themselves above the law". Most of the accused were convicted.

One E-Pandora trial that began on 26 March 2007 ended with Lising being convicted of trafficking in methamphetamine and sentenced to four years in prison. On 18 April 2007, Lising was found guilty with Justice Victor Curtis ruling that the evidence presented by the Crown of Lising's guilt was overwhelming. The defense appealed the verdict, claiming that Lising's rights under the Charter of Rights and Freedoms had been violated by Plante. On 22 June 2007, Justice Curtis dismissed the appeal. Another E-Pandora trial ended on 27 March 2008 with Justice Anne McKenzie convicting Hells Angels associates Richard Rempel and David Revell of trafficking in cocaine, but with her acquitting Giles of trafficking in cocaine and gangsterism. Justice McKenzie ruled that the evidence presented by the Crown against Giles was "weak". The evidence collected by Plante was so strong that three Hells Angels associates, namely Jason Brown, Chad Barrroby and Wissam Mohammad Ayach made plea bargains with the Crown on charges of gangsterism and trafficking in methamphetamine in exchange for lesser prison sentences. Ayach also faced charges of kidnapping and assault on the basis of evidence collected by Plante, which also ended with him being convicted on both counts. The defense lawyers for Ayach hired Dr. Robert Ley, a noted clinical psychologist, who testified: "Ayach was psychologically traumatized by the undercover operation and by the threats, intimidation, assaults and robbery that he claimed Mr. Plante had inflicted upon him". Justice Daphne Smith rejected that defense as she ruled Ayach in the tapes presented by the Crown came across as a "violent gangster" who was not traumatized in the least. Detective Brad Stephen of the Vancouver police stated that Plante was an excellent witness for the Crown, saying: "He did very well in court. They didn't see him coming. All the high-end lawyers in there didn't anticipate he would have the memory he had. They made a fatal mistake in assuming this guy is just a dumb thug. He was a star in the box. In the end, they didn't know how to deal with him."

Chad Barroby also faced charges of selling 26 ounces of cocaine to Plante in October 2004 for $28, 000 dollars, for which he was convicted of and received a light sentence of 18 months of house arrest by Justice Peter Leask. Leask is one of the most controversial judges in British Columbia. Leask's courtroom language is considered to be scandalous and highly inappropriate as he has frequently used the word "fuck" or some variation of it while performing his duties in the courtroom. Besides for his choice of courtroom language, Justice Leask has been accused of having a strong pro-defense bias in cases involving the Hells Angels with a marked tendency to exclude evidence that the Crown wished to present. Likewise, Justice Leask has been noted for his tendency to impose the lightest possible sentences on the Hells Angels that are convicted in trials presided over by him. The Crown Attorneys involved in prosecuting the E-Pandora cases felt that Justice Leask was biased in the favor of the defense and that they would have stood a better chance of obtaining convictions if the trials were presided over by another judge. David Pearse and Kerry Ryan Renaud both pleaded guilty to the E-Pandora charges of manufacturing and selling methamphetamine. Devlin asked for a life sentence on Ryan, but Leask ruled that Ryan was a "relatively rare" criminal who would not reoffend. Leask sentenced Ryan to four years in prison, but gave him credit for time served in jail, which ensured that Ryan served only 28 months in prison. Leask sentenced Pearse to four years in prison, but gave him credit for the time served in jail awaiting his trial and in an unusual move cut his sentence by six months because he had posted bail. Ghavami asked for Leask to dismiss his E-Pandora charges under the grounds that the Crown had taken too long to bring his case to trial. Over the protests of Develin who charged the delays were caused by Morrison, Leask agreed and dismissed all of the charges against Ghavami, saying that the Crown should be ashamed of itself for taking so long to bring the case to trial.

On 13 July 2009 another E-Pandora trial ended with four "full patch Hells Angels being convicted of drug and weapons charges, but acquitted of gangsterism charges. Lising and Potts were convicted of weapons charges. Punko was convicted of weapons charges and of counselling violence on the basis of a tape where he was recorded ordering Plante to burn down a house in Surrey. Violette was convicted of beating a drug dealer, Glen Louie, as part of an extortion bid and of weapons charges. Violette received the longest prison sentence of those convicted in Operation E-Pandora, namely six years in prison, as he was convicted of a violent crime. In November 2009, the defense counsel asked for Justice Leask to "estopped" (stop from proceeding) the E-Pandora charges against the Hells Angels East End chapter as an institution for gangsterism and criminal conspiracy as the Crown alleged that the Hells Angels were a criminal organization that masqueraded as a motorcycle club. On 27 November 2009, Leask estopped the charges against the East End chapter, writing: "My decision is the Crown is estopped from leading evidence that the East End chapter of the Hells Angels is a criminal organization". Leask refused to give his reasons for his decision, which he said he would provide in writing at a later date. Leask told Develin that she should negotiate plea bargains with the last of the Hells Angels facing E-Pandora charges. Devlin reached plea bargains with both Punko and Potts. On 7 December 2009, Punko pleaded guilty to conspiracy to manufacture and sell methamphetamines; selling five kilograms of cocaine; and possession of the proceeds of crime totaling $387, 140 dollars while Potts pleaded guilty to conspiracy to manufacture and sell methamphetamines; trafficking in cocaine and possession of the proceeds of crime totaling $264, 300 dollars. On 12 March 2010, Leask sentenced Potts to one year in prison and Punko to 14 months of prison as he ruled Plante was the real criminal and that Potts and Punko were abused as mere "pawns" by the police agent Plante. Leask's sentences imposed on Potts and Punko as well his stated reasons for doing so caused much controversy at the time with many accusing Leask of being biased in favor of the Hells Angels.

Plante has since changed his name and now lives in hiding. In 2018, he testified for the Crown at a civil forfeiture case where the province of British Columbia sought to seize three clubhouses belonging to the Hells Angels in East Vancouver, Nanaimo and Kelowna as the proceeds of crime. Plante testified that the Hells Angels were not a motorcycle club, but rather a criminal organization that posed as a motorcycle club. Plante denied that he was a "rat", telling Boland in 2013: "I wasn't a rat. They were not my friends. I wasn't friends with any of them. I was doing a job. I wanted to leave a legacy. I wanted to do something significant in my life. I never bartered or sold myself to the RCMP for money. That was the HA's angle."

== Books ==
- Langton, Jerry (2013). The Notorious Bacon Brothers Inside Gang Warfare on Vancouver Streets. Toronto: John Wiley and Sons. ISBN 9781118404577.
- Hall, Neal (2011). Hell To Pay: Hells Angels vs. The Million-Dollar Rat. Toronto: John Wiley and Sons. ISBN 0470680962.
- Sher, Julian; Marsden, William (2006). Angels of Death: Inside the Bikers' Empire of Crime. Toronto: Alfred Knopf Canada. ISBN 9780307370327.
