= Parliamentary Protective Service =

Police force of the Parliament of Canada

Parliamentary Protective Service Service de protection parlementaire
- Official emblem (Note: The emblem incorporates key visual elements from each of the partnering institutions that make up PPS. The Senate and House of Commons are represented by the Parliament coat of arms and surrounded by gold maple leaves similar to those used in the RCMP emblem. The combination of these elements represents the unification of the Senate and House of Commons Protection Services with the former Parliament Hill Security Unit.)
- Abbreviation: PPS; SPP

Agency overview
- Formed: June 23, 2015
- Preceding agencies: Senate Protective Service; House of Commons Security Services
- Employees: ~600 (2018)
- Annual budget: CA$91,100,000

Jurisdictional structure
- Operations jurisdiction: Canada
- Governing body: Parliament of Canada
- Constituting instrument: Parliament of Canada Act

Operational structure
- Elected officers responsible: Francis Scarpaleggia , Speaker of the House of Commons; Raymonde Gagné, Speaker of the Senate
- Agency executive: Mitch Monette, Director

Website
- pps.parl.ca

The Parliamentary Protective Service (PPS; French: Service de protection parlementaire, SPP) is the office of the Parliament of Canada which provides physical security within the Parliamentary Precinct in Ottawa, Ontario.

Policy direction is set by the speakers of the Senate and House of Commons. PPS provides physical security services to the Parliament of Canada (members of Parliament, senators, employees, visitors and buildings of the Parliamentary Precinct), and acts as a parliamentary entity. Through an agreement made between the speaker of the House of Commons, speaker of the Senate and minister of public safety, the PPS director is a member of the Royal Canadian Mounted Police (RCMP) and controls and manages the organization's daily operations.

Parliamentary Protective Service is not a law enforcement agency, and its officers are not peace officers. They are, however, public officers which allows them to be exempt from various weapon restrictions.

== History ==
=== Early security on Parliament Hill ===
The Dominion Police Force, the first federal police agency in Canada, was created in 1868. Initially comprising 12 men, the Dominion Police were responsible for the protection of federal government buildings, including the Parliament. In 1919, the Dominion Police were absorbed by the Royal North-West Mounted Police (RNWMP), which took over responsibility for protecting federal buildings. In 1920, the RNWMP became the Royal Canadian Mounted Police (RCMP). Six members of the RNWMP also left to form the first dedicated parliamentary protective unit, with three assigned to the Senate and three to the House of Commons. The RCMP would continue to be responsible for protecting the exterior grounds of Parliament Hill.

=== Senate Protective Service (1920–2015) and House of Commons Security Services (1927–2015) ===
The Senate Protective Service was formed in 1920 and reported to the Usher of the Black Rod. The House of Commons Security Services were formed in 1927. During their early years, the service's members gave guided tours of the Parliament and sold information booklets to the public.

==== 2014 attack ====
On October 22, 2014, Michael Zehaf-Bibeau evaded security and entered the Hall of Honour with a rifle and a knife after fatally shooting Corporal Nathan Cirillo of The Argyll and Sutherland Highlanders of Canada (Princess Louise's), injuring a constable. In November 2014, the Joint Advisory Working Group on Security identified lack of communication among security groups at Parliament Hill as a significant problem, and recommended combining the existing security forces under the Senate, the House of Commons and RCMP detachment in charge of the grounds into one integrated security service. Parliament subsequently passed Bill C-51, the Anti-terrorism Act, 2015, which among other things, amalgamated the Senate Protective Service, House of Commons Security Services and Parliament's RCMP detachment into the Parliamentary Protective Service.

=== Formation of the PPS (2015) ===
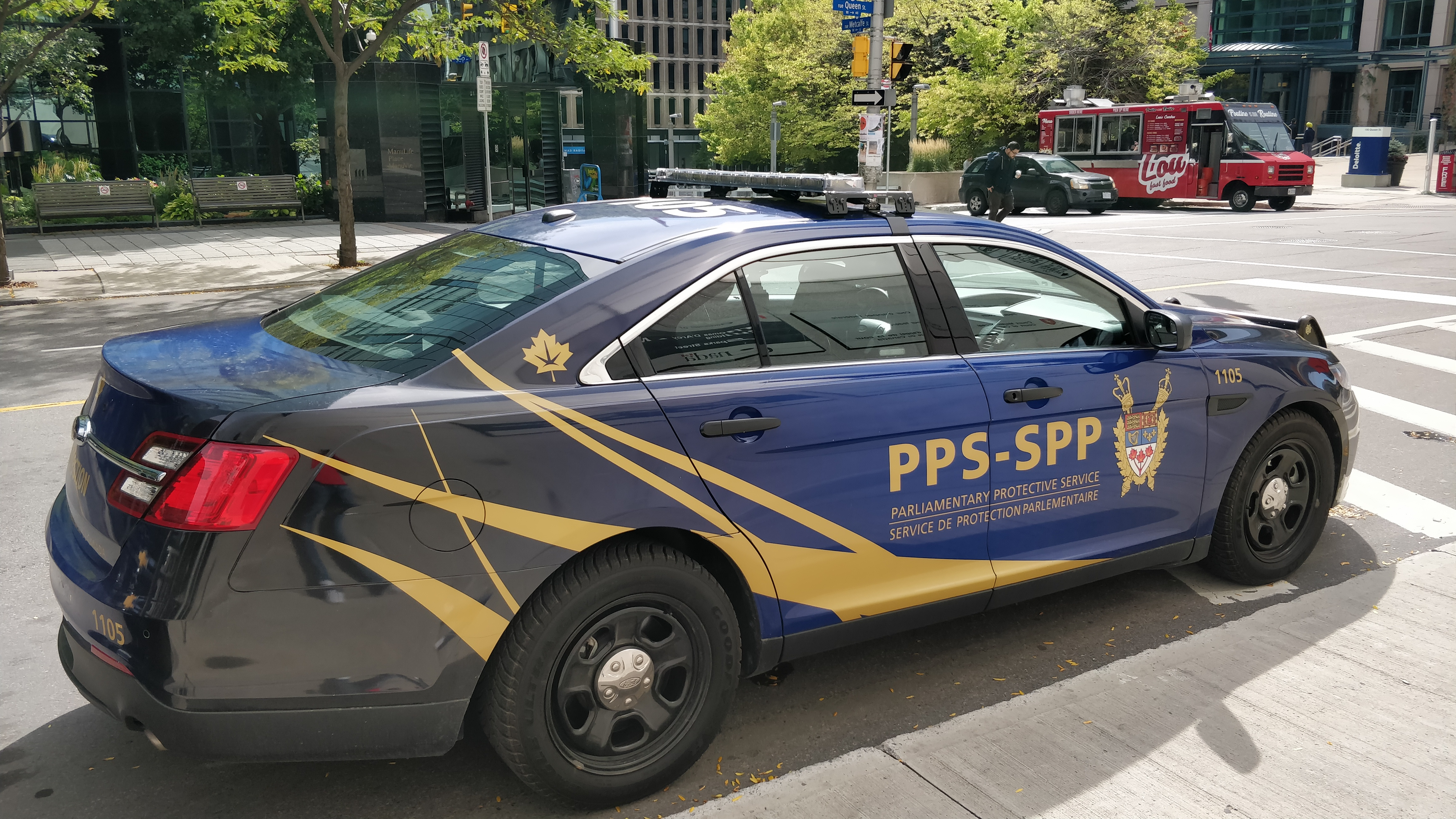
Parliamentary Protective Service Cruiser

By June 23, 2015, the PPS was created by law under an amendment to the Parliament of Canada Act. The speaker of the Senate and the speaker of the House of Commons are responsible for the PPS.

The new Parliamentary Protective Service began, starting with changes in weaponry, radio communication and surveillance equipment. One indication of increased security at Parliament Hill is the appearance of RCMP officers armed with carbines in front of the buildings. About 30 new RCMP officers were added to the newly formed PPS. A member of Parliament pointed out that not all of the officers in the unit spoke French, creating a potential for problems when directing the public during an emergency.

In June 2016, the members of the new service were provided with uniforms designed to identify them as members of PPS.

In November 2016, PPS constables stopped a man from entering the Centre Block with a meat cleaver.

=== Canada convoy protest (2022) ===
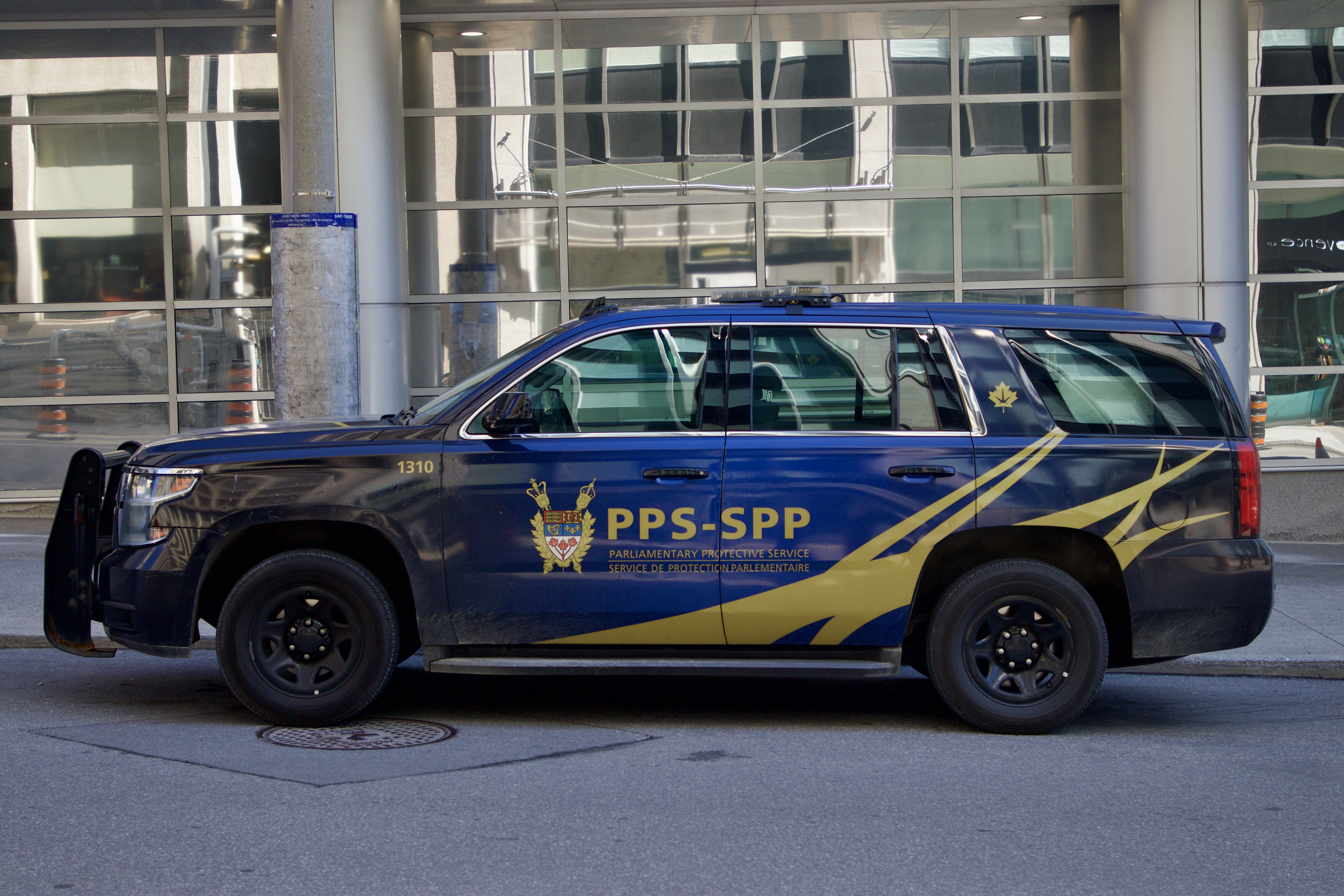
Marked SUV

In late January to mid February 2022, demonstrators occupied the downtown core of Ottawa, including much of the Parliamentary Precinct. The Ottawa Police Service acted as the lead agency, with a number of other agencies from across Canada providing support. The PPS was responsible for security at Parliament Hill, and the Senate of Canada Building.

== Ranks ==
The PPS uses a similar ranks system to the RCMP, with the Director being a Chief Superintendent on secondment from the RCMP. The Officer-in-Charge of PPS Operations holds the rank of superintendent, team managers hold the rank of sergeant, supervisors hold the rank of corporal, and officers with no leadership responsibility hold the rank of constable.

== List of Directors ==
Director	Start date	End date
Mitch Monette	27 November 2023	Active
Larry Brookson (Acting)	2022	27 November 2023
Kevin Leahy	10 June 2019	2022
Marie-Claude Côté (Interim)	11 February 2019	9 June 2019
Jane MacLatchy	23 May 2017	8 February 2019
Mike O'Beirne (Interim)	2016	22 May 2017
Michael Duheme	June 2015	2016

Source: Parliament of Canada
