= Canadian Association of Chiefs of Police =

Canadian political lobbying organization

The Canadian Association of Chiefs of Police (CACP) is a national political lobbying organization for police executives in Canada. It was founded in 1905 as the Chief Constables Association of Canada and adopted the current name in the early 1950s.

== Structure ==
Membership is paid and voluntary, and divided into four classes. Active members must be a police chief or other senior administrator. Associate members may be any police officer not represented by a standard constables union, the chair of a police board, and certain senior government officials. Any active or associate member maintaining 5 years of membership in good standing is eligible to serve as a life member. The organization also has an honorary membership process.

The most recent constitution was written in 2013, which details a 19-person Board of Directors, with an ex officio member, members allocated to each province and one for the territories collectively, with two seats reserved for Ontario, Quebec and British Columbia, and one member allocated to the First Nations Chiefs of Police. Active and life members elect officers at a general meeting, including the president, but excluding the immediate past-president, who serves ex-officio.

The organization employs six permanent staff, led by an executive director.

== Functions ==
The organization claims many functions. Its constitution lays out the following objectives: policy advocacy, partnerships with sector and community partners, establishing ethical norms for the professional and information distribution.

Based on website details, these objectives are realized through various operations. The organization maintains many committees which seem to fulfill sector partnership, such as an aviation committee and international committee. Other committees fulfill the policy advocacy function, like a drug advisory committee and a law amendments committee. Committee work on ethical norms seem to be reflected in an equity committee and an ethics committee.

The organization runs many conferences each year, and creates publications for public and member audiences. It also creates information for member use, and some for public use.

The organization makes frequent submissions on legislative reviews of public safety legislation.

Possibly beyond its constitutionally established objectives, the organization also conducts professional development courses directed to police leaders.

== History and Political Positions ==
The positions of the association often receive national attention.

In 2014, the association demurred when asked to take a stance on missing and murdered Indigenous women in Canada, citing a need to conduct further consultations before adopting an official position.

In the late-2010s, the association has taken positions on improving response to people in mental crisis, as well as the role that drug decriminalization can play in facilitating safer policing outcomes. In 2020, the association released a report finding substance use provides an unnecessary draw in resources for enforcement and is helping drive opioid overdoses, resources better reallocated with the health sector taking up a larger role. The association consequently called for decriminalization of simple possession of drugs such as methamphetamine. The government declined to take up the recommendation.

In 2018, after the Canadian legalization of marijuana, the association raised concerns about reaching training targets for police officers able to assess impairment in roadside settings.

In 2020, the association made an apology on behalf of police chiefs for their role in persecution of LGBTQ+ individuals in Canada's history, and released a toolkit for engagement with those communities. Examples of police cruelty and discrimination include pseudoscientific assessments of police officers in the RCMP to assess their sexuality, the Toronto Bathhouse Raids, and failure to protect vulnerable people from attacks through selective enforcement.

In 2021, the association called for devolution of the power to use the National Public Alerting System for communication to citizens of emergency situations by contacting them by telephone. This call happened in the wake of the 2020 Nova Scotia attacks. The association also contended in 2021 that all police services in Canada use an application called "Child Search Network" to address issues of missing children.

== See also ==
Canadian Police Association
