= Royal Canadian Mounted Police Long Service Medal =

- Obverse and reverse of the medal
- Type: Long service and Good Conduct medal
- Awarded for: No less than 20 years of irreproachable service
- Country: Canada
- Presented by: The monarch of Canada
- Eligibility: Officer, Non-Commissioned Officer or Constables of the RCMP
- Status: Currently awarded
- Established: 6 March 1934
- First award: 1935
- Ribbon bar

Precedence
- Next (higher): King Charles III Coronation Medal
- Next (lower): Canadian Forces' Decoration

The Royal Canadian Mounted Police Long Service Medal was established by royal warrant on 6 March 1934 by King George V. It is the oldest continually awarded honour within the Canadian honours system, and the first created specifically for Canadian service within Canada. Initially proposed by the Royal North-West Mounted Police Veterans’ Association, it took more than ten years for the proposal to be realized. The determination of the veterans was aided by the interest of Commissioner Cortlandt Starnes and Prime Minister R.B. Bennett.

== History ==
The RCMP Long Service Medal was unique in the history of the Canadian honours system. For the first time an honour was created to reward the service of Canadians serving within Canada. Previous awards for service in Canada, like the Canada General Service Medal were presented to both Canadian and British personnel. The timing of the process to create of this honour came in the wake of the Nickle Resolution. The Nickle Resolution grew out of the discontent with the manner in which honours were awarded immediately after World War I. The immediate result of the resolution created a policy of Canadians not being appointed to peerages and titular honours, and the government of Canada only making recommendation for a handful of non-titular honours. After the Statute of Westminster in 1931, which affirmed the equality of the self-governing dominions of the British Empire, there was no process for creating a new honour specifically for one of the dominions. The Canadian government passed the recommendation for creating the honour on to the Dominions Office, who had experience with drafting Royal Warrants. Finally, on 6 March 1934, King George V signed the Royal Warrant creating the Royal Canadian Mounted Police Long Service Medal. Prime Minister R.B. Bennett countersigned the Royal Warrant 15 December 1934 signifying that the King was acting on the advice of his Canadian Ministry. In commemoration of the 80th anniversary of the establishment of the RCMP Long Service Medal, the Force commissioned a detailed history of the medal which was released in November 2014.

== Criteria ==
The RCMP Long Service Medal is awarded to Officers, Non-Commissioned Officers or Constables who are of an irreproachable character and have completed a minimum of twenty years of service. Members of a number of other provincial and national law enforcement agencies, which over the years have been amalgamated with the RCMP, are also eligible provided they meet the award criteria. In 1954, clasps for the ribbon of the RCMP Long Service Medal were approved to signify additional years of service.

== Appearance ==
The medal is round and made of sterling silver. It is suspended from a ribbon of royal blue, with two yellow stripes. The obverse of the medal depicts an effigy of Elizabeth II with the inscription around the edge "Elizabeth II Dei Gratia Regina" (Elizabeth II by the Grace of God Queen). The reverse depicts the heraldic badge of the Royal Canadian Mounted Police with the inscription "For Long Service and Good Conduct". To denote further service a series of clasps may be awarded. To denote twenty-five years of service the clasp is a bronze bar with a single five pointed star. For thirty years of service the clasp is silver with two stars. At thirty five years the clasp is gold with three stars. The next clasp, approved in 2004, is for forty years of service. It is a gold and silver bar with four stars. In 2012 a final clasp for forty-five years of service was approved. This consists of a gold centre star with two silver stars on either side.
