= Police Exemplary Service Medal =

Canadian service medal

- Ribbon bar
- Type: Long-service medal
- Awarded for: 20 years of service
- Presented by: The monarch of Canada
- Eligibility: Police officers
- Status: Currently awarded
- Established: 12 August 1983

Precedence
- Next (higher): Canadian Forces' Decoration
- Next (lower): Corrections Exemplary Service Medal

The Police Exemplary Service Medal (French: Médaille de la police pour services distingués) is a Canadian service medal for police officers. The medal honours 20 years of full-time exemplary service by police officers serving with one or more recognized Canadian police forces. The medal may also be awarded in extraordinary circumstances, such as a posthumous award to a police officer who died in the performance of duties. It is, within the Canadian system of honours, the first and highest of the exemplary service medals.

== Appearance ==
The Police Exemplary Service Medal is circular in shape, 36 millimetres (1 7/16 in) in diameter and made of silver-coloured metal. The obverse of the medal depicts a maple leaf with the scales of justice superimposed upon the center. Circumscribed around the medal are the words "Exemplary Service – Services Distingués". The areas between the edge of the medal and the maple leaf are cut out. The reverse depicts the crowned cypher of the monarch. The recipient's name is engraved on the edge of the medal.

The medal is suspended by a stylized inverted fleur-de-lis on a straight suspension bar. The ribbon of the medal is blue, 32 millimetres (1 1/4 in) wide, with two stripes of gold separating the ribbon into five equal vertical stripes.

Each additional 10-year period of full-time service may qualify recipients for award of a bar to the medal. The bar is silver and bears a stylized maple leaf. When only wearing the ribbon bar, a small silver maple leaf is pinned upon it to represent award of the bar.
