= Order of Merit of the Police Forces =

Canadian honour

- Commander's badge and neck ribbon

Awarded by the monarch of Canada
- Type: National order
- Established: 3 October 2000
- Eligibility: Members of Canadian police services
- Awarded for: Demonstration of the highest qualities of service to Canada, the police community, and humanity at large
- Status: Currently constituted
- Founder: Elizabeth II
- Sovereign: Charles III
- Chancellor: Governor general of Canada
- Principal Commander: Commissioner of the Royal Canadian Mounted Police
- Grades: Commander (COM); Officer (OOM); Member (MOM)

Precedence
- Next (higher): Dependent on grade
- Next (lower): Dependent on grade

The Order of Merit of the Police Forces (French: Ordre du mérite des corps policiers) is an honour for merit that is, within the Canadian system of honours, the only such fellowship reserved for only members of Canada's various police forces. Created in 2000, the order is administered by the Governor in Council, on behalf of the Canadian monarch. Appointment to the order recognizes conspicuous merit and exceptional service, the level of which is reflected by the organization's three hierarchical grades.

== Creation ==
The Canadian Association of Chiefs of Police in 1996 approached the Chancellery of Honours at Rideau Hall to propose an order of merit for Canada's police forces, possibly modelled on the Order of Military Merit. This prompted the solicitor general of Canada at the time, Herb Gray, to contact his provincial counterparts, inquiring of their reactions to such idea. As consent from the provincial governments was unanimous in its approval, the society was set up and officially implemented when, on 3 October 2000, Queen Elizabeth II applied the royal sign-manual to her letters patent constituting the Order of Merit of the Police Forces. The first induction ceremony for the order then took place on 17 May 2002.

== Grades and precedence ==
The Canadian monarch, seen as the fount of honour, is at the apex of the Order of Merit of the Police Forces as its Sovereign, (Note: In royal proclamations issued by the King or in his name, the order is thus referred to as "Our Order of Merit of the Police Forces".) followed by the governor general, who serves as the fellowship's Chancellor, and the Commissioner of the Royal Canadian Mounted Police, who is the Principal Commander. Thereafter follow three grades—each having accordant post-nominal letters that are the same in both English and French. Promotions in grade are possible, though there are limits to the populations of the grades. Any person thus honoured must return their lower grade insignia, as no member may at any time hold more than one appointment in the organization. Further, within the order of preference for Canadian honours, each grade of the Order of Merit of the Police Forces precedes a similar grade of the Royal Victorian Order and succeeds a similar grade of the Order of Military Merit.

Grades of the Order of Merit of the Police Forces:
Grade	Post-nominal letters	Ribbon	Recognizing	Preceding	Succeeding
Commander (French: Commandeur)	COM		Conspicuous meritorious service and leadership in areas of great responsibility, typically in the national sphere or international level.	Commander of the Order of Military Merit (CMM)	Commander of the Royal Victorian Order (CVO)
Officer (French: Officier)	OOM		Conspicuous meritorious service in areas of responsibility, typically at the regional level or provincial sphere.	Officer of the Order of Military Merit (OMM)	Lieutenant of the Royal Victorian Order (LVO)
Member (French: Membre)	MOM		Exceptional service or performance of duty.	Member of the Order of Military Merit (MMM)	Member of the Royal Victorian Order (MVO)

== Insignia ==
Upon admission into the Order of Merit of the Police Forces, members are gifted various insignia of the organization, though these remain property of the Crown. The badges are similar in design to those of the Order of Military Merit, consisting of a dark blue enamelled cross pattée with four equal arms, at the centre of which is a disc bearing a maple leaf on a white enamel background, surrounded at its edge by a red enamel ring (annulus) bearing the words MERIT • MÉRITE • CANADA. Slight differences in appearance represent each grade: for Commanders, the emblem is gilt with a red enamel maple leaf in the gold central disk; for Officers, it is gilt with a gold maple leaf; and for Members, both the badge itself and the maple leaf are silver. The reverse bears only a serial number, and all are topped by a St. Edward's Crown, symbolizing that the order is headed by the sovereign. These insignia are worn with the order's ribbon, which is three bands of equal width, the outer two in blue and the centre one in golden. Male Commanders will carry their badge either at the neck or on a medal bar on the left chest, while Officers and Members display theirs only on a medal bar, suspended by, respectively, a bar of gold or silver decorated with a laurel motif. Women wear their emblems on a ribbon bow pinned at the left chest. The ribbon bar, worn for undress, is the same for each grade, save for a miniature blue cross pattée with a maple leaf, the colour of which matches that on the badge of the grade that the wearer was appointed to; someone who has been promoted within the order may wear on their ribbon bar the pins of all grades that they have occupied. These same miniatures also serves as a lapel pin for civilian wear.

== Eligibility and appointment ==
To qualify for induction into the Order of Merit of the Police Forces, individuals must be, at the time of appointment, an active member of any of Canada's police services, including criminal investigators, patrol officers, administrators, trainers, and researchers. Either civilians or the advisory committee of the local branch of the Association of Chiefs of Police will forward names to the national advisory committee, which then makes its recommendation to the Advisory Committee for the Order of Merit of the Police Forces. This latter group consists of the President of the Canadian Association of Chiefs of Police, who acts as chairperson, one of the Deputy Commissioners of the Royal Canadian Mounted Police, the President of the Canadian Police Association, one head of a provincial police force, three chiefs of municipal or regional police forces, the Deputy Secretary of the Chancellery of Honours, and two additional persons appointed by the governor general for between three and five years; the Secretary to the Governor General serves as the Secretary General of the Order of Merit of the Police Forces.

Approximately 50 individuals are admitted to the order each year; the total is limited to 0.1% of the total number of employees of police services in Canada in the preceding year. No more than six percent of those appointed to the order in total may be inducted as Commanders and no more than 30% may be made Officers. Inductions are also not made posthumously, though members of foreign armed forces can be admitted as honorary members in any grade.

=== Removal ===
The constitution of the order allows for the removal of members. Five terminations have occurred.

Royal Canadian Mounted Police sergeant Warren S. Gherasim, appointed to the order in 2006, was removed from the rolls in 2010 for receiving a disgraceful conduct sanction.

Former City of Victoria Chief of Police Frank Elsner, appointed in 2011, was terminated February 3, 2021.

Retired Inspector Glenn Trivett of the Ontario Provincial Police was terminated on September 23, 2020.

Former Wikwemikong Tribal Police Service Chief Terry R. McCaffrey, appointed to the order in 2020, was removed from the rolls on January 24, 2025, following a criminal conviction.

Toronto Police Service Superintendent Robert Scott Baptist, appointed to the order in 2021, was removed from the rolls on January 24, 2025.
