= Samuel Lount =

Canadian politician (1791–1838)

Member of the Upper Canada Legislative Assembly for Simcoe
- In office 1834–1836
- Succeeded by: Charles Wickens

Personal details
- Born: September 24, 1791 Catawissa, Pennsylvania, United States
- Died: April 12, 1838 (aged 46) King Street Gaol, Toronto, Upper Canada
- Cause of death: Execution by hanging
- Resting place: Toronto Necropolis
- Party: Reform
- Occupation: Blacksmith, politician

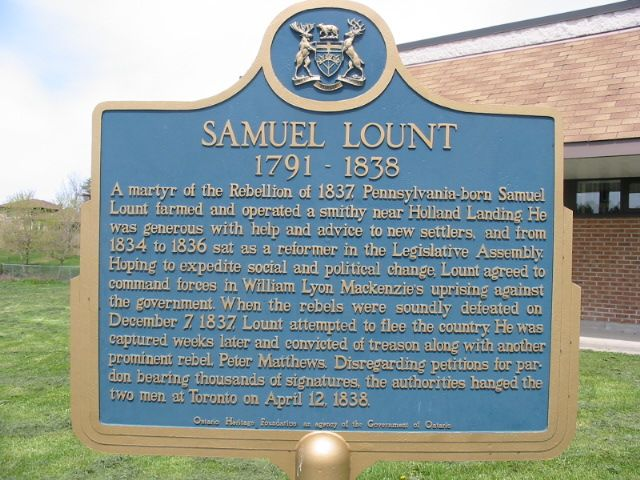
Historical plaque to Sam Lount at Holland Landing, Ontario

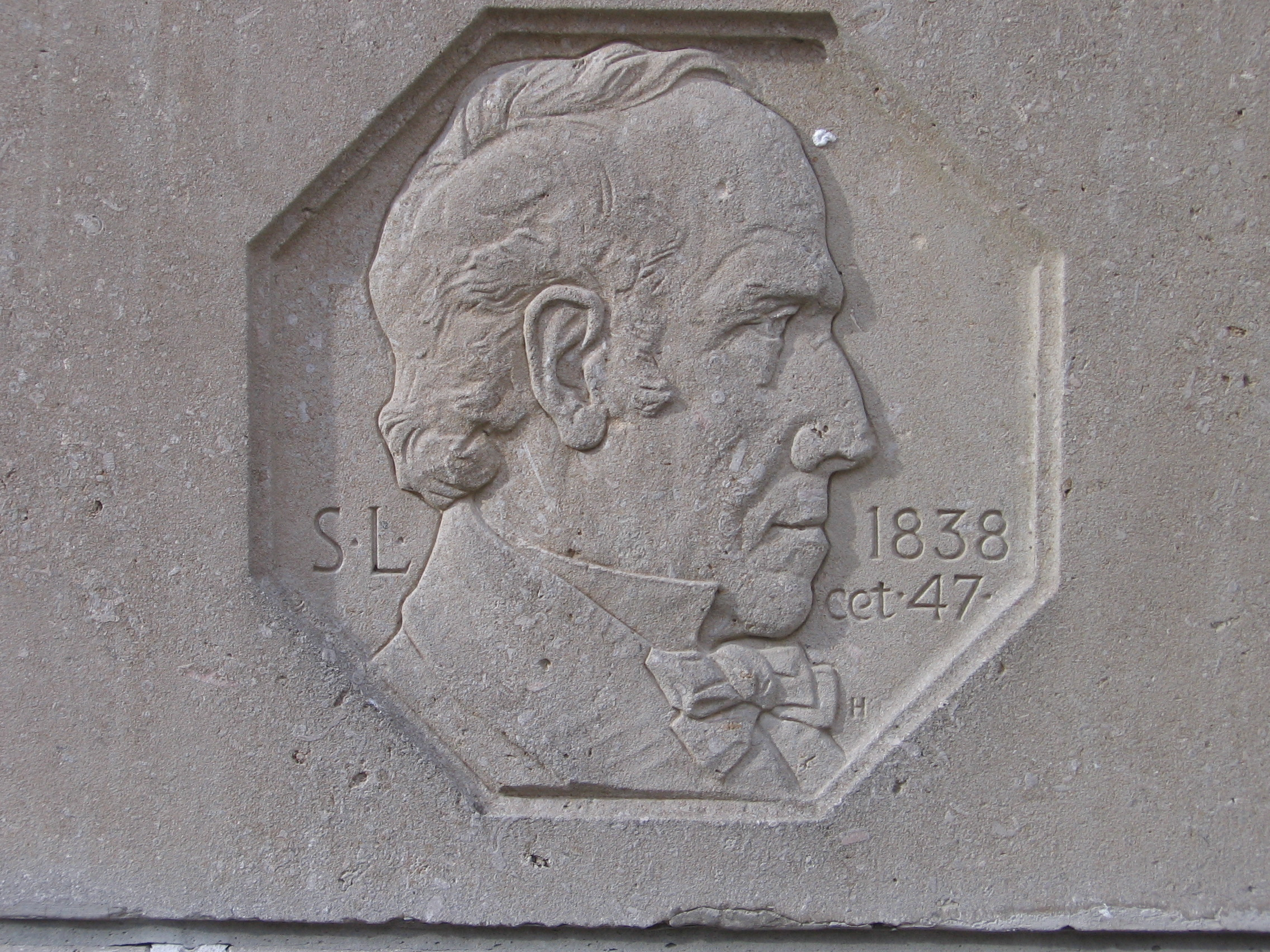
Emanuel Hahn's Memorial to Lount at Mackenzie House, Toronto

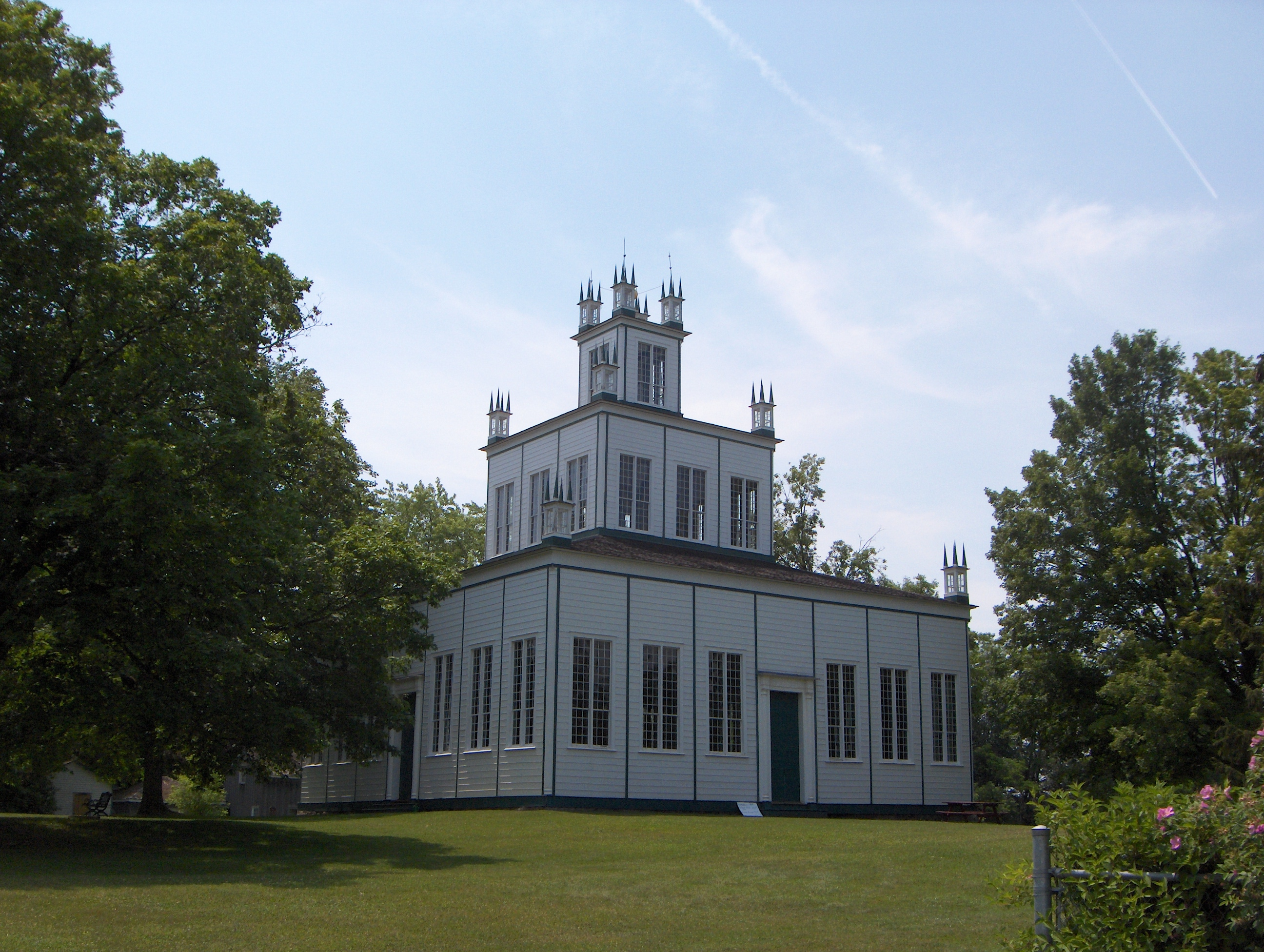
Sharon Temple located in Sharon, Ontario

Samuel Lount (September 24, 1791 – April 12, 1838) was an American-born Canadian blacksmith, farmer, magistrate and member of the Legislative Assembly in the province of Upper Canada for Simcoe County from 1834 to 1836. He was an organizer of the failed Upper Canada Rebellion of 1837, for which he was hanged as a traitor. His execution made him a martyr to the Upper Canadian Reform movement.

== Early life ==
Lount was born in Catawissa, Pennsylvania, United States, in 1791. He was the first son of English immigrant Gabriel Lount (1759–1827), who arrived in Philadelphia in 1773 as an indentured servant, served in the Pennsylvania Militia 1777–1778, then moved to Cape May, New Jersey, about 1782. Samuel's mother Philadelphia Hughes (1765 – c. 1827), was of an early Cape May Presbyterian founding family, the granddaughter of Revolutionary-era Patriot James Whilldin and a direct descendant of Mayflower passengers John Howland and Elizabeth Tilley. The Lounts and the extended Hughes family emigrated from Cape May to Catawissa, Northumberland, Pennsylvania, about 1790, then to Whitchurch Township in Upper Canada in 1811. Gabriel Lount and his sons Samuel, Gabriel and George became surveyors and extensive land-owners in Upper Canada. Gabriel Lount served as a Member of Parliament from Upper Canada, as did his son Samuel.

Lount never appears to have been a Quaker, or a member of the closely related Children of Peace in nearby Sharon. He was trapped in Pennsylvania during the War of 1812, and returned to Whitchurch only in 1815. That year, he married Elizabeth Soules, with whom he had seven children. He briefly kept a tavern in Newmarket while doing work as a surveyor, but spent most of his adult life as a blacksmith in Holland Landing. Lount was also on the Committee of Management for the company that built the first steamboat on Lake Simcoe, The Colborne. In much of his business, he worked as an agent of his youngest brother, George Lount, a prominent Newmarket merchant; their partnership ended in 1836.

== Political activity ==
Samuel Lount first became politically active after the expulsion of William Lyon Mackenzie, the elected Reform representative for York County from the Provincial Assembly by the "Family Compact." The "Upper Canada Central Political Union" was formed on January 21, 1833 in Toronto to organize petitions to the Crown on Mackenzie's behalf. The Simcoe County branch was organized by Samuel Lount in Holland Landing, and the Fourth Riding of York branch was organized by Sam Hughes, an elder of the Children of Peace in Sharon.

In 1834, he was elected to the 12th Parliament of Upper Canada representing Simcoe County. In the Legislature, he sat on the committee to incorporate Canada's first farmers' co-operative, the "Farmers Storehouse Company", managed by Samuel Hughes (Quaker).

Lount, like many reformers, was defeated in the election of 1836 but claimed widespread electoral fraud and intimidation. Charles Duncombe, who was another leader of the Rebellion, carried a Reform petition on the electoral irregularities in Lount's case to London but was refused an audience by the British Colonial Office.

== 1837 Rebellion ==
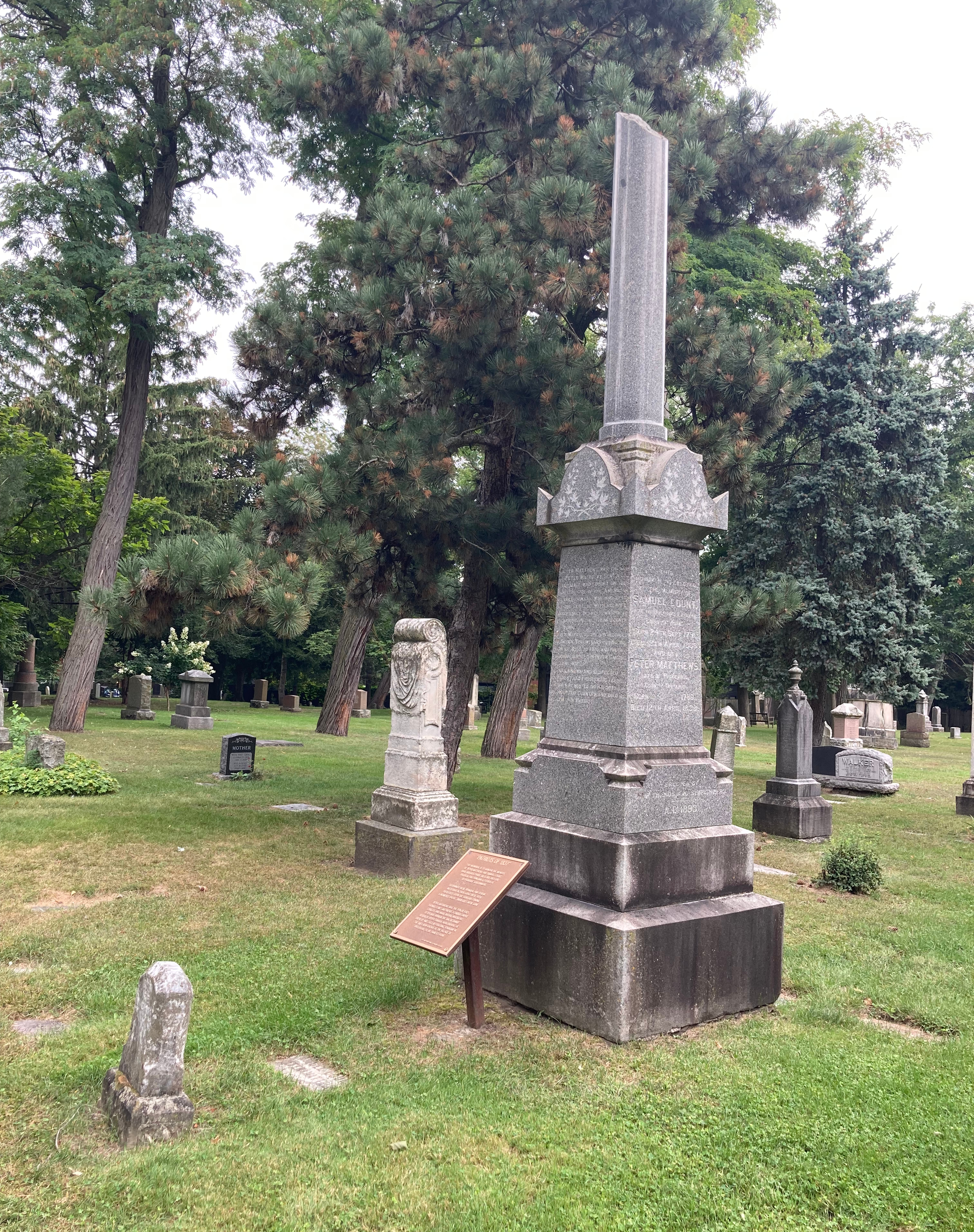
Graves of Lount and Matthews at Toronto Necropolis

In July 1837, just after the death of King William IV, William Lyon Mackenzie began organizing a "constitutional convention." Delegates would be selected by Reform associations around the province, who would meet to defend Upper Canada's constitution. The Family Compact refused to call an election after the death of the king, as the constitution required. At a meeting held in Newmarket in August, Samuel Lount, Sam Hughes, Nelson Gorham, Silas Fletcher, Jeremiah Graham and John McIntosh were selected as delegates. All but Hughes and McIntosh were among the primary organizers of the rebel farmers who were to march on the city of Toronto on December 7, 1837. Lount organized the volunteers from the Children of Peace community in Sharon to join a planned march on Toronto and joined the rebel group gathered at Montgomery's Tavern.

When the rebellion fell apart, Lount attempted to flee to the United States, but was arrested and accused of treason. Despite a petition signed by 35,000 Upper Canadians demanding clemency, Lount was hanged on April 12, 1838, in the courtyard of the King Street Gaol at King and Toronto Streets in Toronto. Joseph Sheard was the foreman for the jail and was expected to share in the work of building the scaffold. However, he refused, saying, 'I'll not put a hand to it,' said he; 'Lount and Matthews have done nothing that I might not have done myself, and I'll never help build a gallows to hang them." Peter Matthews, another public-spirited farmer who participated in the rebellion, was executed alongside him. They were originally buried together in the Strangers' Burial Ground but were later removed to the Toronto Necropolis, where the present fifteen-foot severed column was unveiled in 1893.

Lount had intervened to try to get medical aid for loyalist Lieutenant Colonel Robert Moodie and had stopped Mackenzie from burning the house of sheriff William Botsford Jarvis. However, the Executive Council of the province had felt that they needed to set an example.

Lount's last words were recorded: "Be of good courage boys, I am not ashamed of anything I've done, I trust in God, and I'm going to die like a man." These words are replicated on a historical plaque near the site of the jail where he was executed.

== Legacy ==
- Lount Lake, Ontario, north of Kenora (at 50.170888, -94.307458)
- Lount Lake, Ontario, east of Kenora (at 49.840974, -94.312918)
- Lount Street, Toronto
- Lount Street, Barrie, Ontario
- Samuel Lount Road (Holland Landing)
- Lount & Matthews Commemoration, an annual event marking their patriotism, held on or near the April 12 anniversary of their deaths
- Rebellion Walking Tour, hosted by Mackenzie House in Toronto, on or near the April 12 anniversary of Lount's hanging
- A likeness of Samuel Lount was to appear on banknotes of the Republican Bank of Canada, the financial arm of the Hunters' Lodges. Images of Peter Matthews and James Morreau were also to have appeared on the bank's notes, following their executions for treason.

== In popular culture ==
Samuel Lount, a 1985 film by Laurence Keane and Elvira Mary Lount (a great-great-grandniece of Samuel), starred R. H. Thomson as Lount.
