= Samuel Hughes (Quaker) =

Samuel Hughes (1785–1856) was a prominent member of the Children of Peace, a reform politician in Upper Canada, and the president of Canada's first farmers cooperative, the Farmers' Storehouse Company. After the Rebellions of 1837 he rejoined the Hicksite Quakers and became a minister of note.

== Early life and immigration ==
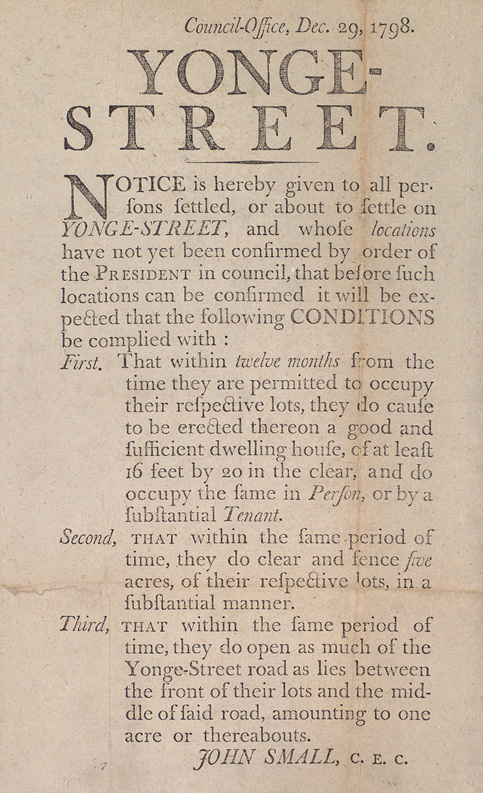
A notice to settlers of Yonge Street from 1798, indicating their duties once they settled land granted to them

Hughes was born on 4 February 1785 in Catawissa, second son of noted Quaker minister Job Hughes and his second wife Eleanor Lee. In 1804–1805, the extended family moved to Upper Canada. Two daughters married Friends in the West Lake area; the remaining six children, including Samuel, all settled with their parents in the Yonge Street settlement, where they married and established their own farms and businesses. Job Hughes was the leading minister in the Yonge Street Monthly Meeting, and his wife Eleanor was an elder. Job died in 1810 on a trip to attend New York Yearly Meeting. Samuel Hughes was twenty years old when the family moved to Upper Canada. He was married for the first of three times in June 1811 to Sarah Webster, daughter of Abram and Anna Lundy Webster. Sarah died 24 December 1815.

He married secondly, Mary Doan, in 1819, daughter of Ebenezer Sr. and Anna Savilla Sloy Doan born 7 December 1762, died childless on 5 April 1827. He married lastly, Anna Armitage, daughter of Amos and Martha Doan Armitage, widow of Isaac Wiggins, and niece of his second wife on 21 June 1829.

== The Children of Peace ==
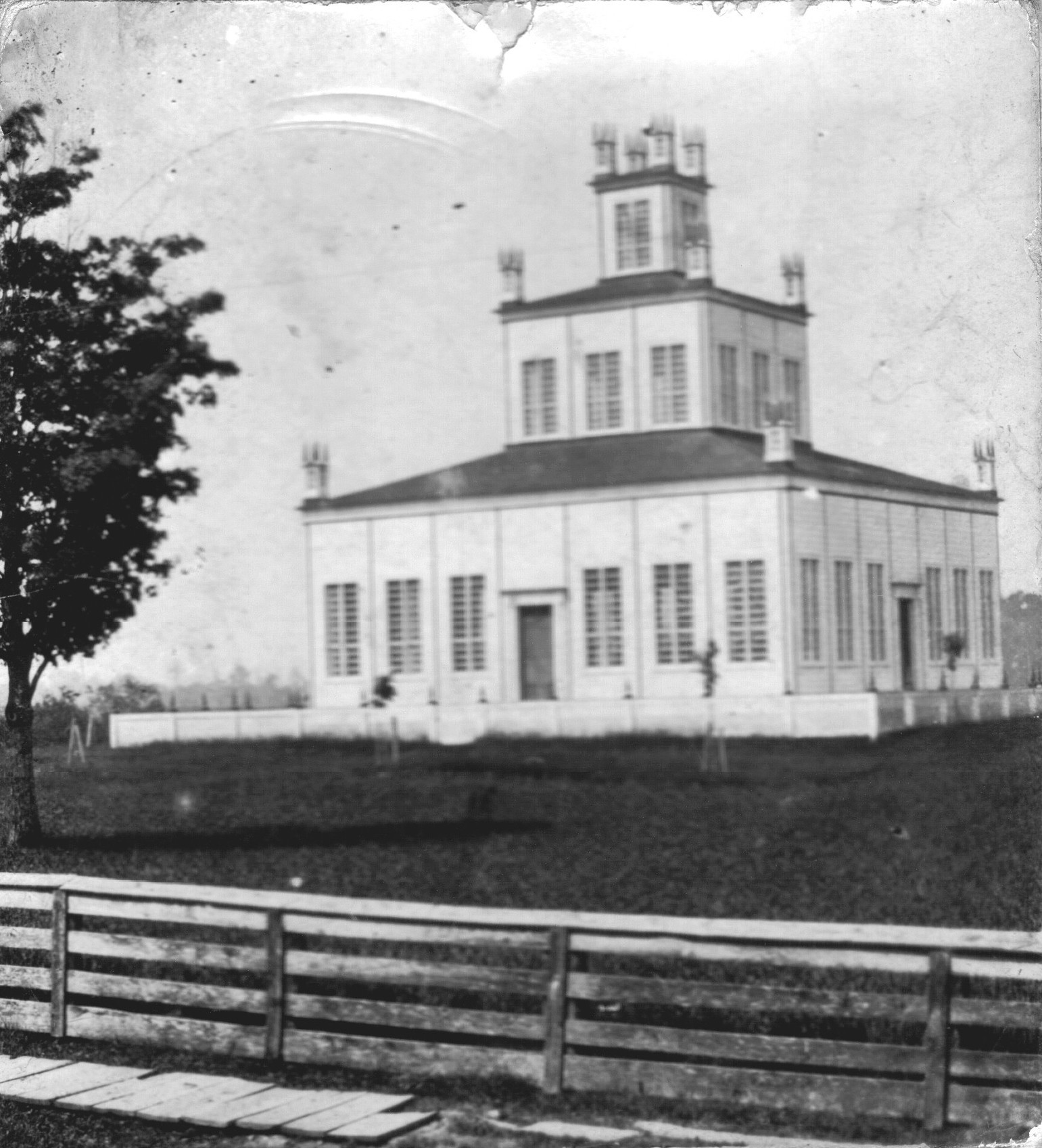
The Temple of the Children of Peace, Sharon

The Children of Peace (1812–1889) were a utopian Quaker sect that separated from the Yonge Street Monthly Meeting during the War of 1812 under the leadership of David Willson. Today, they are primarily remembered for the Sharon Temple, an architectural symbol of their vision of a society based on the values of peace, equality and social justice.

Samuel Hughes' eldest sister, Rachel Hughes Lundy, was one of the first followers of Willson. The entire Hughes family, including Samuel, soon joined them. Most of those who joined the Children of Peace lived along Yonge St., a military road. It seems that their experience of religious persecution for their pacifist stance on the war drew them to Willson who had formed a new group, the Children of Peace, on the promise he would raise the peace testimony as "an Ensign to the Nations." It was these families – most of whom were related to the Hughes – who were to move to East Gwillimbury township after the War, and to join Willson in building the new community of "Hope". Samuel Hughes sold his farm opposite the Yonge Street meeting house, and purchased 146 acres on lots 105 & 106, 1st concession, of East Gwillimbury, right behind the David Willson lot (Conc. 2, lot 10), and downstream from his brother-in-law Israel Lundy's grist mill. He operated a sawmill on this land in partnership with Enos Dennis, his brother-in-law.

Samuel Hughes soon became an elder in the group, and played a prominent role in the distribution of their alms raised in the Temple. Their system of mutual aid was based on labour exchanges (work bees), cooperative marketing, a credit union, and for a short time, a land-sharing agreement. At one point, Hughes purchased a 200-acre crown reserve in the village as part of this land-sharing plan. For those in immediate crisis, alms and a shelter for the homeless served as a stopgap. So successful was this cooperative regime of mutual aid, that by 1851, Hope was the most prosperous agricultural community in the province.

== The Farmers' Storehouse Company ==
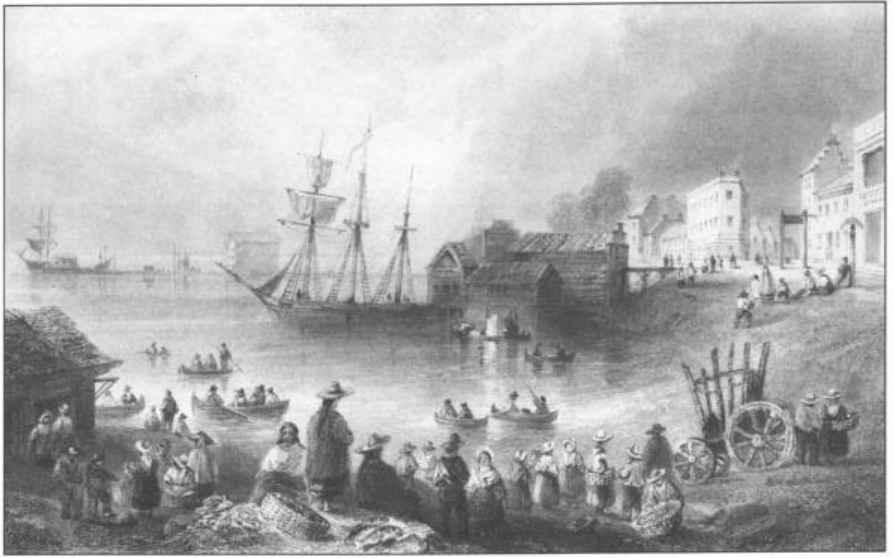
Fish Market, Toronto, 1838 with Farmers' Storehouse in the background

The Farmers' Storehouse was Canada's first farmer's cooperative, founded in Toronto and the Home District in 1824. It stood at the centre of a broad economic and political reform movement. The Farmers' Storehouse was both a producers and consumer cooperative. Farmers sold their wheat an flour through the company and purchased their needs from its store. They could also obtain small loans equal to the share capital they held. Management of the Company soon passed to Samuel Hughes who became president in 1832. The Children of Peace had just established a credit union within the group, and under Hughes leadership, the Farmers' Storehouse company also tried to establish itself as a bank after a Special Committee of the Assembly had established that joint-stock banks did not require a legislated charter. The cooperative movement was politicized due to the obstruction of the Family Compact to the company's incorporation.

== Reform politician ==
William Lyon Mackenzie was the elected representative for the riding from 1828. He, like Hughes, was part of a democratic reform movement opposed to the ruling Family Compact. Samuel's First political participation came in August 1831, in a public meeting of 150 to 200 people for the township of East Gwillimbury held in the "chapel" of the Children of Peace. The meeting was one of a series organized by Mackenzie that summer to petition the British parliament to address a number of abuses. Samuel was elected one of five members of a committee to prepare the petition, seek signatures, and correspond with other township committees on the matter.

=== Upper Canada Central Political Union ===
Mackenzie was unjustly expelled from the legislature in 1831, and prevented from taking his seat although re-elected three times. He travelled to London to protest, and while away the reformers started the Upper Canada Central Political Union. It was a petitioning organization which tried to influence the legislature, not a political party.

A public meeting was called on 5 June in Newmarket to establish a second branch of the Central Political Union – for the townships of Whitchurch, East Gwillimbury and Brock, the newly established Fourth Riding of the County of York. Samuel Hughes chaired the meeting, and William Reid was secretary; both were elders of the Children of Peace. This meeting, on a motion from Hughes, established "Committees of Vigilance" for each township in the riding, "to secure the return of an independent Member to the ensuing Parliament." The use of committees of reformers to nominate candidates, rather than open nonpartisan public meetings, was innovative and led to the proposal for a district wide convention to do the same for other ridings. These committee members met in Hope the next month to elect an executive for the riding. This ten member executive contained five members of the Children of Peace: Samuel Hughes was unanimously elected president, William Reid, secretary.

=== The Grand Convention ===
The example set by the Fourth Riding was generalized in a Grand Convention in February 1834. Samuel Hughes was a delegate to this convention, and called for it to become a "permanent convention" or political party – Canada's first. After the delegates had selected their candidates and prepared a ten-point platform to which those candidates had to pledge themselves, Samuel Hughes "proposed that the convention should resolve to continue its sittings from time to time during the continuance of the next ensuing parliament, and proposed a Constitution for its adoption." Although the original call for the convention had emphasized that once assembled, its members should assume the responsibility of nominating an executive to reconvene the convention for the next year, a majority of the delegates reacted negatively to Hughes' proposed constitution, because they "had not been appointed for any such purpose, and that their power should cease would cease immediately after the next general election." Nonetheless the Reformers swept the elections.

=== The Canadian Alliance Society ===
After the elections, the reformers formed another petitioning organization, the Canadian Alliance Society. The Children of Peace immediately formed a branch of the Canadian Alliance Society in January 1835, and elected Samuel Hughes its president. This branch met every two weeks during the parliamentary session to discuss the bills before the assembly. One of their more interesting proposals was to create a petitioning campaign for a written provincial constitution; Hughes was appointed to the committee. A constitution would be the means by which "the proceedings of our government may be bounded – the legislative council rendered elective, and the government and council made responsible – and that all Eccliastics be prohibited from holding seats in the council and that no officer of the government should be irresponsible."

=== The Toronto Political Union & Rebellion of 1837 ===
After the unfair elections of 1836, the more moderate reformers withdrew in disappointment with their electoral loss, leaving William Lyon Mackenzie to fill the political vacuum. He organized the Toronto Political Union and called for a Constitutional Convention in July 1837. He began organizing local "Vigilance Committees" to elect delegates. The structure of the convention was much like that of the "General Convention of Delegates in 1834, and many of the same delegates were elected.

The second meeting of the renewed Political Union was called to order by Samuel Hughes three days later, on 3 August in Newmarket. Mackenzie regaled the crowd for more than an hour, reviewing the complaints listed in the Declaration of the Toronto Reformers. Samuel Hughes proposed a motion which castigated "the conduct of Sir Francis Bond Head ... for he has tampered with our rights at elections – disposed of many thousands of pounds of our revenue without our consent – and governed us by the strong hand of arbitrary and unconstitutional power – depreciating our currency, and pretending to maintain cash payments, while the Bank, immediately connected with his government, was flooding the colony with the notes of a Bankrupt Bank in another province." The meeting appointed Hughes, Samuel Lount, Nelson Gorham, Silas Fletcher, Jeremiah Graham, and John McIntosh as delegates to the convention (and all, with the exception of Hughes and MacIntosh, leaders in the Rebellion); they also appointed 23 men to a "Committee of vigilance" to organize local political unions. These committees and the convention delegates were to become the organizational framework for the Upper Canada Rebellion. Although a convention delegate, Hughes, a pacifist, did not participate, unlike his now-famous cousin, Samuel Lount.

== Temperance advocate ==
Since his early life with the Society of Friends, Hughes had always been moved by a religious concern on the abuse of alcohol. In December 1831, however, he was to experience a transformative event that sharpened his concern. He discovered the body of a drunken man, frozen in the snow. Hughes was to compose a highly stylized parable, which he was eventually to publish with other parables and lectures on intemperance in 1836. These were among the first temperance publications in the province.

Starting in January 1835, Hughes began what might be considered an annual lecture on intemperance. In the first of these lectures, he noted that there were "105 habitual drunkards out of a population of 1070 male adults" in East Gwillimbury and Whitchurch townships. Among these 105 habitual drunkards were "78 husbands who are parents of families, and from the best information, fathers of 312 children, and are companions, or rather abusers, of 78 afflicted women, who are bound to suffer under the government of madness and distraction." Another lecture was presented in January 1836. The tragic death by fire of a local magistrate in March led Hughes to immediately organize more meetings, and to publish his "Remarks on Intemperance". About November 1837, he presented a more theological manuscript to the other elders of the Children of Peace, seeking their support. The pamphlet not only argued against such rituals involving wine as communion, but also contested whether Christ had ever commanded his disciples to do so.

This address appeared to be the source of the final breach between Hughes and the Children of Peace. He had evidently attempted to minister on the subject in their regular meetings for worship, against their objections. Hughes felt he had no choice but to separate from the Children of Peace so that he could continue his ministry.

== Hicksite minister ==
Hughes was struck with a severe illness on 30 September 1839 that left "most of his friends and neighbours despairing of hopes of recovery." It was a month before he recovered, and three months before he could attend to business. At that point, he fell from the upper floor of his barn, striking his head. These illnesses kept him from moving to the new house he had built on his farm until the summer of 1840. In June, as he moved into the new house near Holland Landing, he also applied for membership in the Yonge Street Monthly Meeting (Hicksite). His wife, Anna Armitage Wiggins Hughes applied for membership in August, and the two were accepted.

Hughes was recommended as a minister in 1844. Subsequently, Hughes appeared to travel regularly in the ministry. In 1845, he journeyed to Yearly Meeting in Michigan, and went on to visit all the meetings westward of Farmington. In 1846, he was to visit Mariposa Meeting (Ontario), and 1849, the "Queen's Bush" in Peel County, where he held meetings among white and black settlers. In 1850, he was to strike south as far as Salem, Ohio, where he was to publish "A warning to the Society of Friends everywhere". During a six-week visit to Ohio Yearly Meeting in 1851, Hughes was to publish a pamphlet "To the Children and Youth of Friends' Families, Constituting Yonge Street Monthly Meeting; and to all others in similar circumstances". He had written a similar epistle to the students of West Lake Boarding School in February 1851.

Hughes died on 11 December 1856.

== Published work ==
- A Vision Concerning the Desolation of Zion; or, The Fall of Religion Among the Quakers, Set Forth in a Similitude or Vision of the Mind: Particularly Dedicated to the Captives, or Scattered Tribes of That Body, Now Commonly Called Orthodox and Hicksites (J.H. Lawrence, Guardian Office, Toronto, 1835), 12 pp.
- [Remarks on Intemperance] (W.J. Coates, Toronto, [1836]), 40 pp.
- An Epistle to my Friends, and All That Love the Truth in Mariposa (Newmarket, n.d. [1846]), 8pp.
- A Warning to the Society of Friends Everywhere (Printed at the Homestead Journal Office, Salem, Ohio, 1850), 8 pp.
- To the Children and Youth of Friends' Families, Constituting Yonge Street Monthly Meeting; and to All Others in Similar Circumstances. (Enoch Harris, Mount Pleasant, Ohio, 1851), 8 pp.
- Last Will and Testament of Samuel Hughes, on Religious Subjects. For Friends and Relations Everywhere (1856)
