= Sam Hughes (disambiguation) =

Sam Hughes (1853–1921) was a Canadian soldier and politician.

Sam, Sammy, or Samuel Hughes may also refer to:

- Sam Hughes (American football) (born 1970), American football player
- Sam Hughes (fighter) (born 1992), American mixed martial artist
- Sam Hughes (footballer) (born 1997), English footballer
- Sam Hughes (Manitoba politician) (1873–1940)
- Sam Hughes (musician) (1824–1898), ophicleide player
- Sammy Hughes (footballer) (died 2011), footballer from Northern Ireland
- Sammy T. Hughes (1910–1981), baseball player
- Samuel Hughes (judge) (1913–2002), Canadian judge, Chairman of the Hughes Inquiry
- Samuel Hughes (Quaker) (1785–1856), member of the Children of Peace and politician in Upper Canada
- Samuel Hughes (rugby league) (born 2001), Australian rugby league player
- Samuel C. Hughes (1829–1917), American businessman and politician
- qntm (born 1983), British programmer and science fiction author

== See also ==
- Samantha Hughes (disambiguation)
- Hughes (surname)
