= Samantha Hughes =

Samantha Hughes may refer to:

- Samantha Hughes (fighter) (born 1992), American mixed martial artist
- Samantha Hughes, fictional character in The House of the Devil
- Samantha Hughes, fictional character in In Country

== See also ==
- Sam Hughes (disambiguation)
- Hughes (surname)
