= Farmers' Storehouse Company =

Canada's first farmers' cooperative

The Farmers’ Storehouse was Canada's first farmers' cooperative, founded in Toronto and the Home District in 1824. It stood at the centre of a broad economic and political reform movement that, in its essentials, was not greatly different from contemporary movements such as the Owenite socialists in Britain, as well as much later cooperative movements such as the United Farmers of Alberta in the early twentieth century.

== Context ==
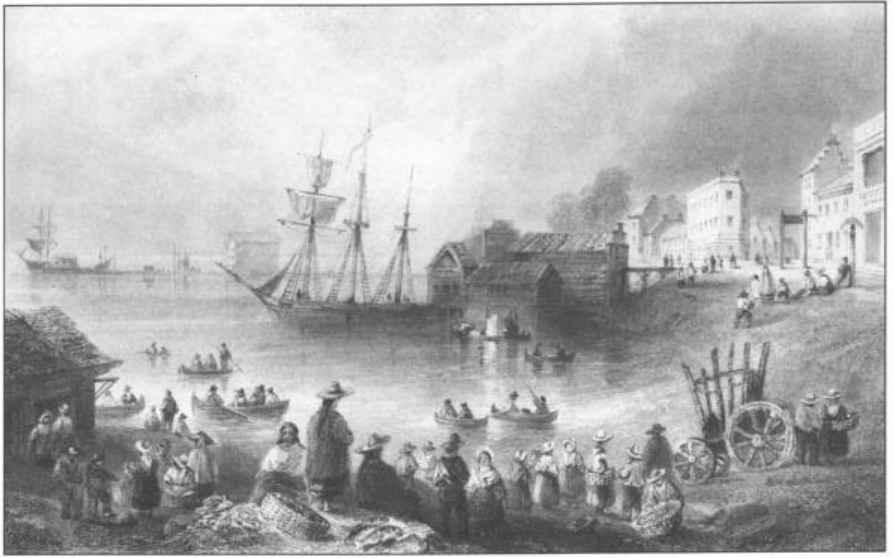
Fish Market, Toronto, 1838 with Farmers' Storehouse in the background

The Farmers’ Storehouse was organized as an unincorporated joint stock company on the 7 February 1824. It was in many ways similar to a large number of consumer-owned community flour and bread "societies" which flourished in England from 1759 to the 1860s. The "Bread societies" which developed in England during the Napoleonic Wars were largely extensions of existing "Friendly societies." Friendly Societies were democratically organized self-help community insurance organizations designed to alleviate tragedies arising from accident, sickness and old age. Regular contributions to a common fund entitled the society member to relief under prescribed circumstances thereby preserving that member’s respectability in the face of calamity. The rise in the price of flour during the Napoleonic Wars led many Friendly Societies to form "Flour clubs" which purchased and ground wheat for members, selling it to them at prime cost; and by 1800, an increasingly large number were collectively erecting their own mills to grind grain at cost. One of the largest was the Birmingham Union Mill, a three-storey mill built in 1797.

Like these English examples, the Farmers’ Storehouse was organized on a joint stock basis to engage in trade on behalf of the poor; they were early co-operatives. These co-operative ventures were increasingly organized under the banner of Owenite socialism during the 1820s.

== Organization ==
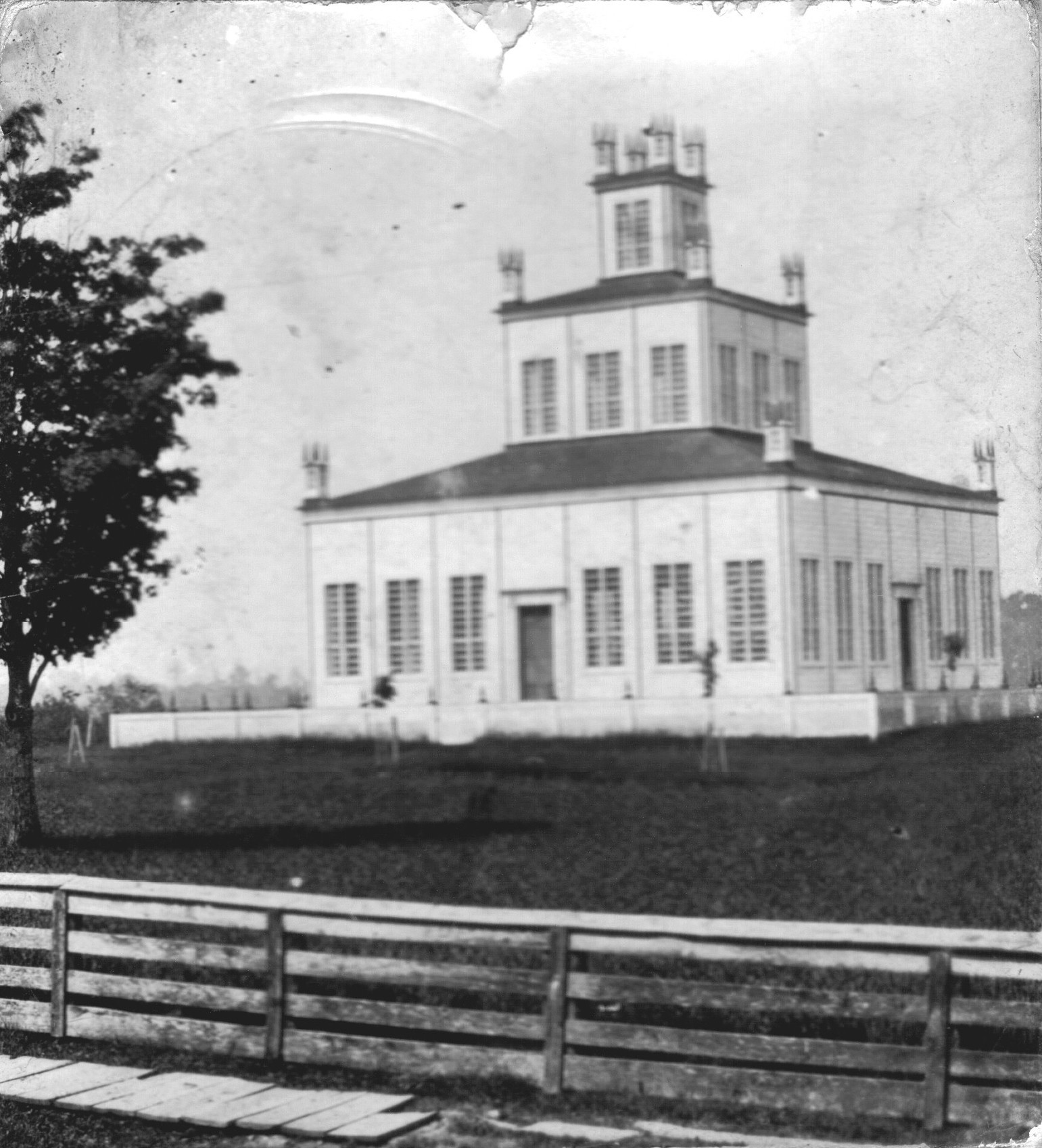
Sharon Temple National Historic Site

After the Napoleonic Wars, as industrial production in Britain took off, English manufacturers began dumping cheap goods in Montreal; this allowed an increasing number of shopkeepers in York (Toronto) to obtain their goods competitively from Montreal wholesalers. With the consolidation of both the flour and wholesale trades in Montreal, a group of Home District millers and farmers formed the Farmers’ Storehouse Company, to circumvent the control of these new Toronto merchants. The company petitioned the Lt. Governor for a "water lot" on the beach on which to build the storehouse; they received the lot where the St. Lawrence market building now stands (and immediately south of the original market buildings). They built a warehouse 100 feet long by 20 ft. wide, and 20 ft. high. The first president of the Company was Joseph Shepard, a prominent Reform organizer with close ties to William Lyon Mackenzie. The company had 5 board members, a $3000 capitalization, and was operated by a store-keeper.

The Farmers' Storehouse was both a producers and consumer cooperative. Farmers sold their wheat and flour through the company and purchased their needs from its store. They could also obtain small loans equal to the share capital they held.

Management of the Company soon passed to Samuel Hughes, a member of the Children of Peace, a religious group who lived in the village of Hope, East Gwillimbury township. The Children of Peace had just established a credit union within the group, and under their leadership, the Farmers' Storehouse company also tried to establish itself as a bank. It was widely emulated throughout the province by the "Newcastle District Accommodation Company" (near Peterborough) and the "Bath Freeholders’ Bank" (near Kingston).

== Politics ==
Both presidents of the Farmers's Storehouse Company, Joseph Shepard and Samuel Hughes, were prominent Reform organizers north of Toronto. The cooperative movement was politicized due to the obstruction of the Family Compact to the company's incorporation. There were no general incorporation laws in this period. Incorporation required a special law being passed in each case. The Company sought incorporation in 1828 in order to get the deed to their water lot. The bill to incorporate them was blocked in 1829, 1830, 1831. In 1835 they tried a different approach, seeking incorporation as a bank after a Special Committee of the Assembly had established that joint-stock banks did not require a legislated charter. The Family Compact, which had blocked their incorporation bills, made joint stock banks illegal in 1837.
