= Reform movement (Upper Canada) =

Reformers
- Founded: 1817
- Dissolved: 1849
- Succeeded by: Clear Grits; Parti bleu
- Headquarters: Toronto, Upper Canada
- Ideology: Canadian nationalism Reformism; Republicanism
- Policies: Fiscal: Owenism; Social: Chartism

The Reform movement in Upper Canada was a political movement in British North America in the mid-19th century.

It started as a rudimentary grouping of loose coalitions that formed around contentious issues. Support was gained in Parliament through petitions meant to sway MPs. However, organized Reform activity emerged in the 1830s when Reformers, like Robert Randal, Jesse Ketchum, Peter Perry, Marshall Spring Bidwell, and William Warren Baldwin, began to emulate the organizational forms of the British Reform Movement and organized Political Unions under the leadership of William Lyon Mackenzie. The British Political Unions had successfully petitioned for the Great Reform Act 1832 that eliminated much political corruption in the British parliamentary system. Those who adopted these new forms of public mobilization for democratic reform in Upper Canada were inspired by the more radical Owenite Socialists who led the British Chartist and Mechanics Institute movements.

== Early organized reform activity in Upper Canada ==
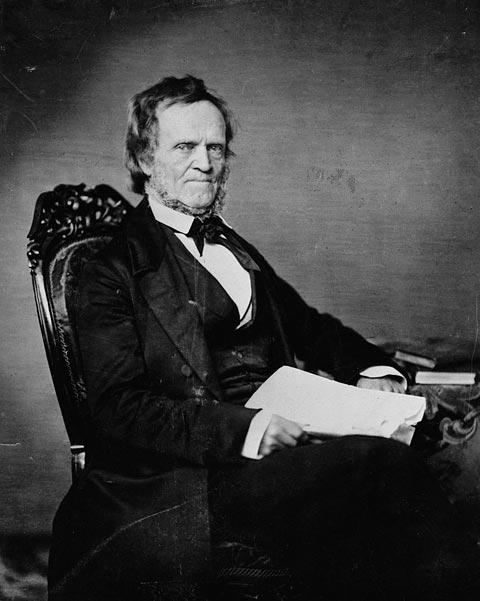
William Lyon Mackenzie, Radical Reform Leader

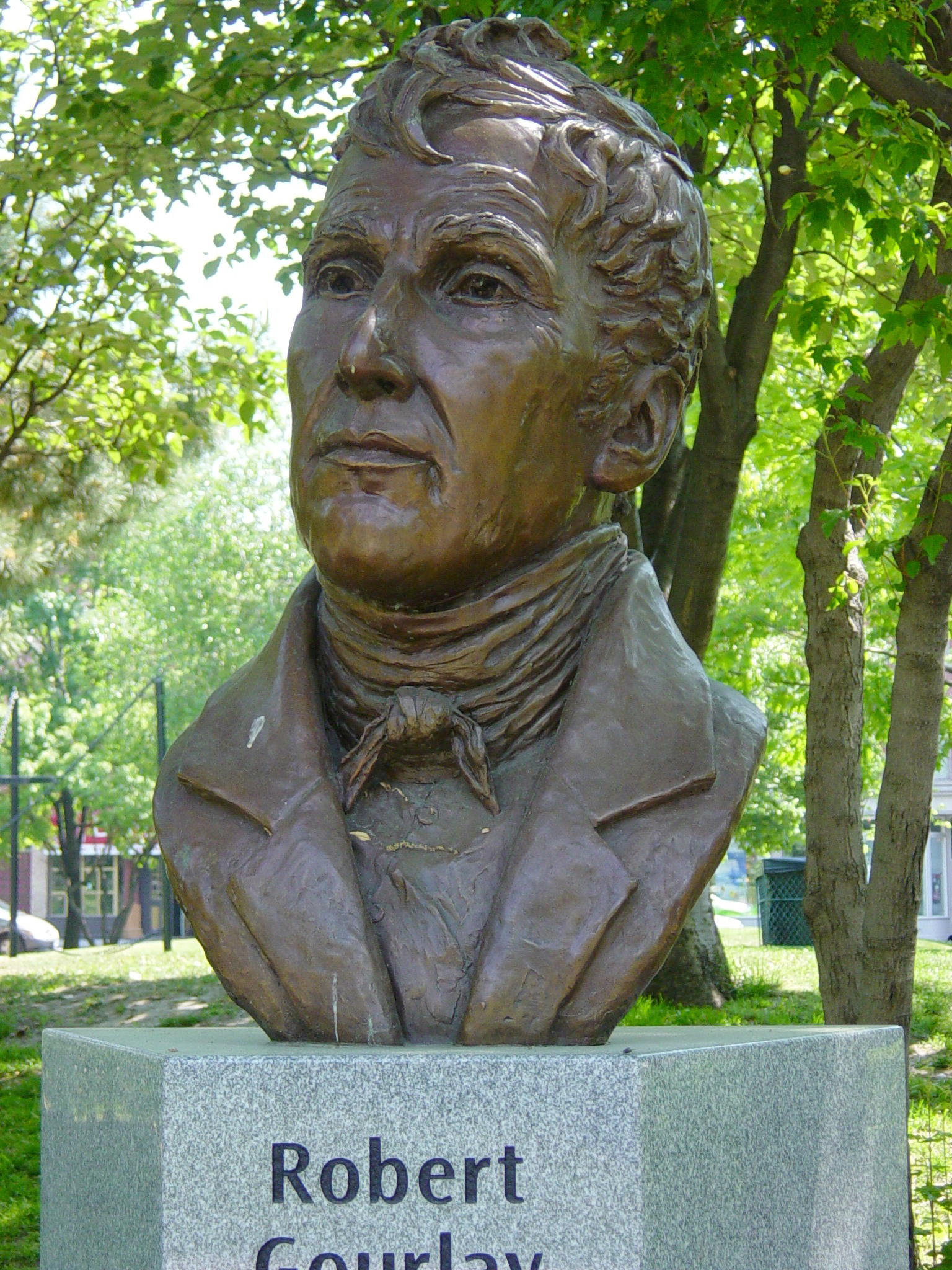
Bust of Robert Fleming Gourlay

Organized collective reform activity began with Robert Fleming Gourlay (pronounced "gore-lay"). Gourlay was a well-connected Scottish emigrant who arrived in 1817, hoping to encourage "assisted emigration" of the poor from Britain. He solicited information on the colony through township questionnaires, and soon became a critic of government mismanagement. When the local legislature ignored his call for an inquiry, he called for a petition to the British Parliament. He organized township meetings, and a provincial convention - which the government considered dangerous and seditious. Gourlay was tried in December 1818 under the 1804 Sedition Act and jailed for 8 months. He was banished from the province in August 1819. His expulsion made him a martyr in the reform community.

A loose committee of the "Friends of Religious Liberty" composed of William Lyon Mackenzie, Jesse Ketchum, Egerton Ryerson, Joseph Shepard and nineteen others, chaired by William Warren Baldwin (who was one of only 3 Anglicans) circulated a petition against an "Established Church" in the province. It gained 10,000 signatures by the time it was sent to the British Parliament in March 1831. The petition gained little due to direct intervention by the Church of England.

By mid-1831, the leaders of the reform faction in the House of Assembly such as Rolph and the Baldwins were discouraged and withdrew from politics. At this point, William Lyon Mackenzie organized a "General Committee on the State of the Province" which organized the first truly provincial petitioning campaign to protest a whole series of ills. Although 10,000 signatures were obtained the only real gain was to organize the reformers in the province.

Mackenzie's organizational efforts made him many enemies in the House of Assembly. When the House reconvened, Mackenzie was unjustly expelled. Over the next two years, Mackenzie was re-elected only to be expelled a total of five times. As demonstrations in support of Mackenzie were increasingly met with violence by Orangemen, he travelled to England to personally present his appeal in March 1832. Mackenzie's trip to England was to prove inspirational, as he was exposed to the power of the British form of reform activity, the Political Unions, in the run-up to the passage of the Reform Act 1832.

== British Reform Movement ==
Upper Canadians saw themselves as citizens of Great Britain with all the rights granted by the British Constitution. It is no surprise then, that the Upper Canadian Reform Movement should adopt the organizational forms of the British Reform Movement.

=== Political unions and the Reform Act 1832 ===
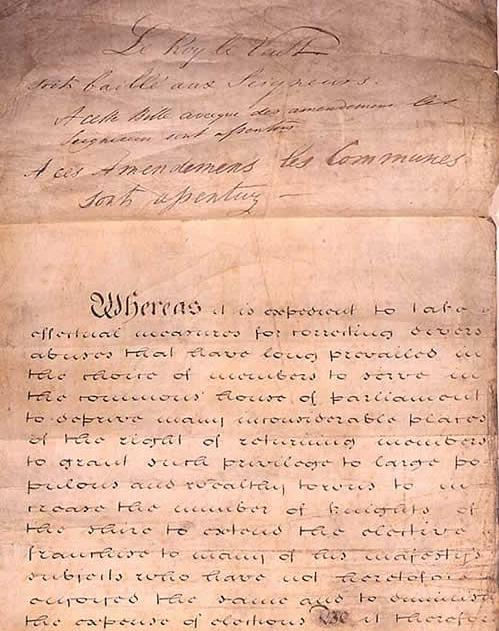
First page of the Reform Act 1832

During the late 1820s, large scale, national petitioning campaigns were organized through a new form of organization, the "Political Union". One of the first and largest was the Birmingham Political Union founded in 1830. Its stated aim was to campaign for electoral reform of the House of Commons, "to be achieved by a general political union of the lower and middle classes of the people". Other more radical Political Unions, like the "Metropolitan Political Union" had their roots in Owenite socialism.

The London-based "Metropolitan Political Union" was formed by members of the London Radical Reform Organization, including Henry Hunt, Henry Hetherington, William Lovett, Daniel O'Connell and William Gast. The MPU was radically democratic, and depended upon its members' input to function. It not only advocated parliamentary reform, but embodied these reforms in the way in which it was organized; it was committed to universal suffrage, annual parliaments, and vote by ballot, all eventually incorporated in the Chartist platform.

The Representation of the People Act 1832 (commonly known as the Reform Act 1832 or sometimes as the Great Reform Act) was an act of Parliament (2 & 3 Will. 4. c. 45) that introduced wide-ranging changes to the electoral system of England and Wales. William Lyon Mackenzie was in London appealing his expulsion from the Upper Canadian Legislative Assembly to the Colonial Office at the time, and was present in the galleries of the British Parliament for the debate on the Reform Act 1832. Seeing the effectiveness of the political unions in the United Kingdom, Mackenzie recommended their adoption in Upper Canada.

=== National Union of the Working Classes and the Coldbath-fields National Convention ===
Disappointment about the refusal to include the working classes in the Great Reform Act 1832 led to a more protracted campaign for universal suffrage (known as Chartism) by the radical political unions. The London-based, Owenite inspired National Union of the Working Classes was founded in 1831 by former members of the Metropolitan Political Union. They organized a constitutional convention at Coldbath-Fields to challenge the British parliament in the spring of 1833. They called for adult male suffrage, the secret ballot, annual elections, equally sized electoral districts, as well as for salaries and the elimination of property qualifications for members of parliament. The government prohibited the meeting, and sent 1,800 police against a crowd of 3,000 or 4,000, leading to a general riot. Mackenzie was no doubt aware of the riot as he was living a ten-minute walk away, and news of the riot was published back in Upper Canada by his newspaper, the Colonial Advocate.

=== Atlantic Revolution and Chartism ===
Dramatisation of the trial of the Chartists at Shire Hall, Monmouth, including background information

The membership of the NUWC was later integrated into the London Working Men's Association, an organization established in London in 1836, that led the Chartist movement. The founders were William Lovett, Francis Place and Henry Hetherington. They were associated with Owenite socialism and the movement for general education. They published a People's Charter on 8 May 1838 calling for universal suffrage. The London Working Men's Association was aware of the unrest in the Canadas in early 1837, and themselves petitioned the British Parliament after a public meeting to protest the "base proposals of the Whigs to destroy the principle of Universal Suffrage in the Canadas". To implement the Chartist plan, they called a series of mass meetings across the country in the summer of 1838 to select delegates to a "General Convention of the Industrious Classes". After the General Convention of the Industrious Classes met in May 1839, their Charter petition was rejected by Parliament. This rejection led to the Newport Uprising of 1839 in Wales, suppressed by Sir Francis Bond Head's cousin, Sir Edmund Walker Head. Rather than view each rebellion in isolation, the Newport Rising (1839), the two Canadian Rebellions (1837–38) and the subsequent American Patriot War (1838–39) can be seen to share a similar republican impetus. They should all be viewed in the context of the late-18th- and early-19th-century Atlantic revolutions that took their inspiration from the republicanism of the American Revolution.

== Political Union Movement in Upper Canada ==
=== Upper Canada Central Political Union ===
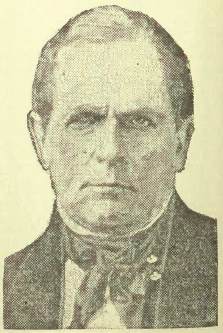
Thomas D. Morrison

The Upper Canada Central Political Union was organized in 1832–33 by Thomas David Morrison while William Lyon Mackenzie was in England. Although inspired by British examples, the Upper Canada Central Political Union was more radical than most reform organizations of the period. The goals proposed by Thomas Morrison at the York election hustings in late 1832 mirrored those of the Metropolitan Political Union, and the Owenite National Union of the Working Classes. The Union's objects began with the usual invocation of Upper Canada having been "singularly blessed with a Constitution the very image and transcript of that of Great Britain" but continued with a list of the ways in which that constitution had been abridged before concluding on a radical democratic note. It was not an electoral organization per se, but, like its British model, a voluntary political organization devoted towards electoral reform. It, like its successor, the Canadian Alliance Society, was formed immediately after an election, not before, since their aim was to influence the legislature rather than elect candidates. This union collected 19,930 signatures by May 1833 on a petition protesting Mackenzie's unjust expulsion from the House of Assembly by the Family Compact. It dissolved shortly thereafter.

==== Children of Peace and the Grand Convention of Delegates ====
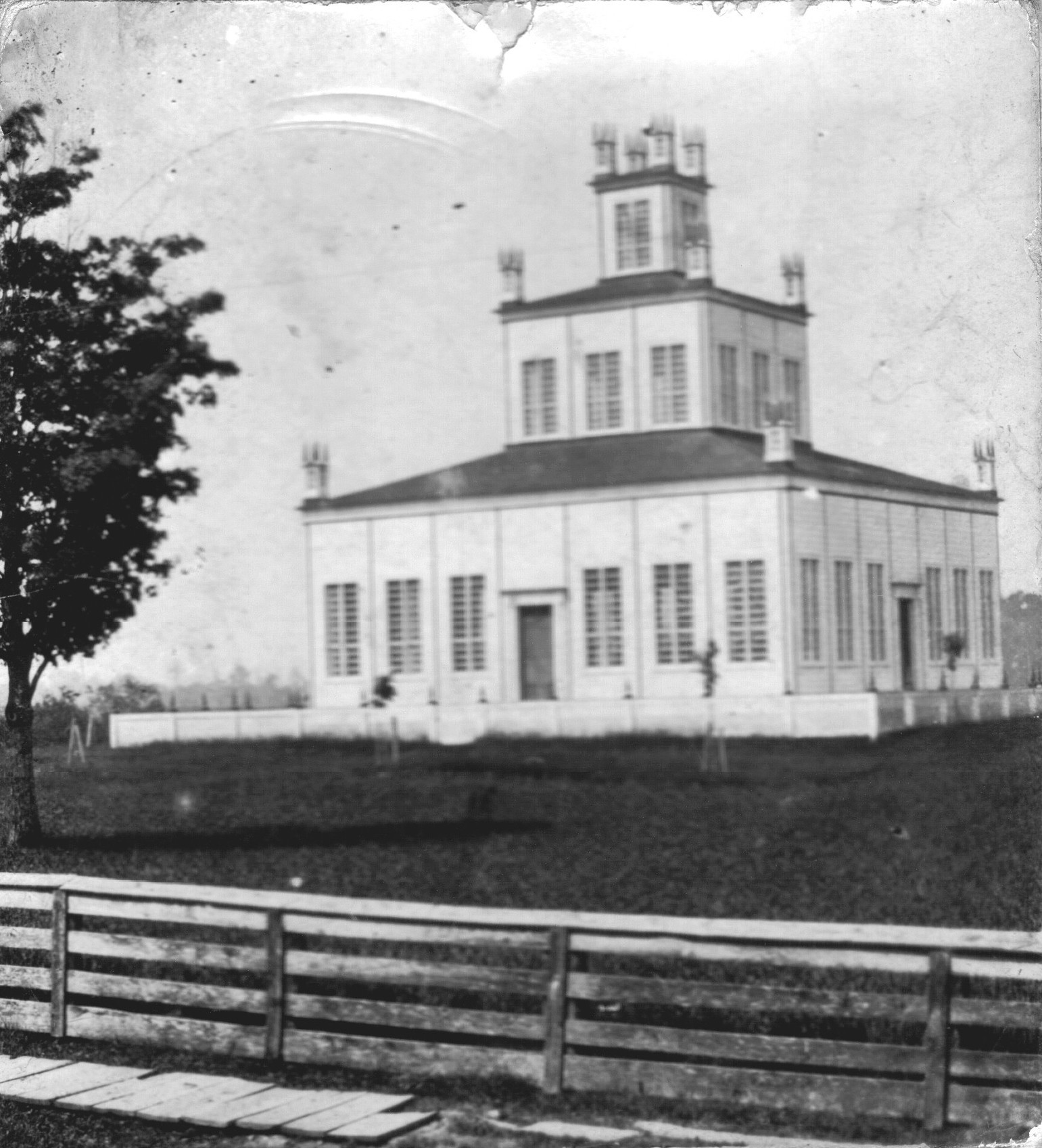
Sharon Temple National Historic Site

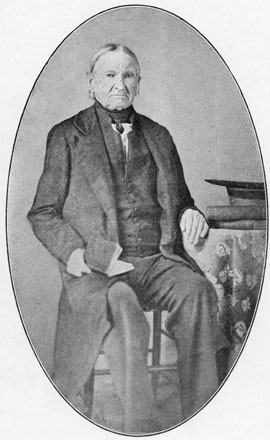
David Willson, leader of the Children of Peace, in old age

In the absence of Mackenzie, the village of Hope (now Sharon), founded by the Children of Peace, a branch of Quakerism, became the new focus of reform activity. They were leaders in the new Fourth Riding of York (a part of the riding that had continued to re-elect Mackenzie over the years). A member of the group, Samuel Hughes, the president of Canada's first farmers' cooperative (the Farmers' Storehouse), established a "committee of vigilance" to nominate an "independent member" for the Assembly in June 1832. Half the committee were members of the Children of Peace, including the leader of the Children of Peace, David Willson. The group also included Randal Wixson, the editor of the Colonial Advocate in Mackenzie's absence.

Mackenzie returned to Toronto from his London journey in the last week of August, 1833, to find his appeals to the British Parliament had been ultimately ineffective. At an emergency meeting of Reformers, David Willson proposed extending the nomination process for members of the House of Assembly they had begun in Hope to all four Ridings of York, and to establish a "General Convention of Delegates" from each riding in which to establish a common political platform. This convention could then become the core of a "permanent convention" or political party – an innovation not yet seen in Upper Canada. The organization of this convention was a model for the "Constitutional Convention" Mackenzie organized for the Rebellion of 1837, where many of the same delegates were to attend.

The Convention was held on 27 February 1834 with delegates from all four of the York ridings. The week before, Mackenzie published Willson's call for a "standing convention" (political party). The day of the convention, the Children of Peace led a "Grand Procession" with their choir and band (the first civilian band in the province) to the Old Court House where the convention was held. David Willson was the main speaker before the convention and "he addressed the meeting with great force and effect". The convention nominated 4 Reform candidates, all of whom were ultimately successful in the election. The convention stopped short, however, of establishing a political party. Instead, they formed yet another Political Union.

==== Shepard's Hall ====
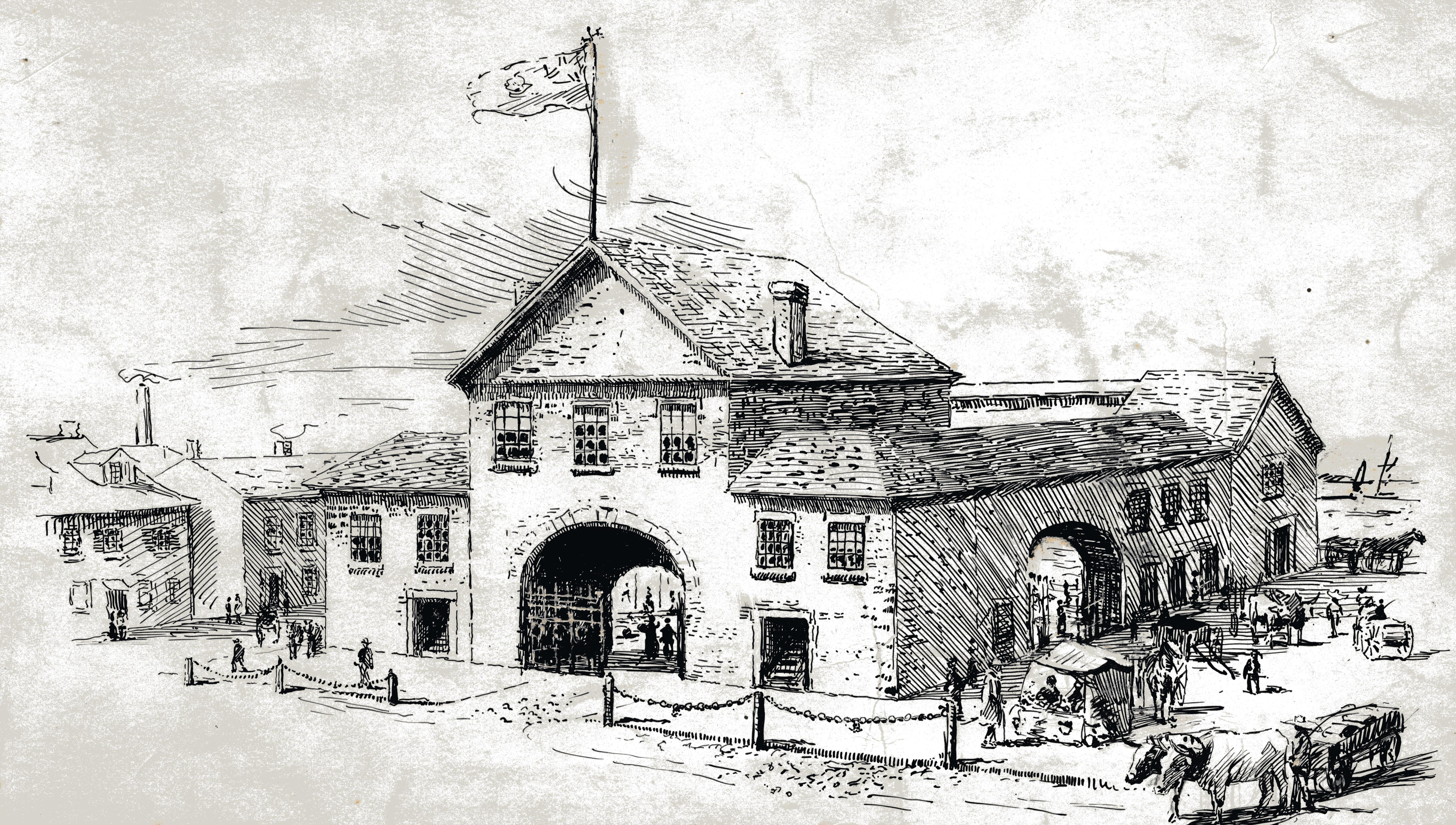
Second market in York (Toronto)

As they were organizing the Convention of Delegates, the reformers also built their own meeting place, which they proposed to call "Shepard's Hall" in honour of Joseph Shepard, one of the political union organizers. The reformers built the hall because their open public electoral meetings were under attack from the Orange Order. Shepard's Hall was to move several times; it began in a converted court house, moved to Mackenzie's old newspaper office in the second Market building, before taking its final home in "Turton's Building", which they shared with Mackenzie's newspaper The Constitution, and William O'Grady's newspaper, The Correspondent & Advocate. Shepard Hall shared its large meeting space with the Mechanics' Institute and the Children of Peace. The Mechanics' Institute was a working class educational institute that had its roots in the Owenite London Radical Reform Organization; the Toronto Institute was formed by a member of the London Mechanics' Institute in 1831. The three legs of the developing Reform movement were thus the political union, the Children of Peace and the Mechanics Institute; the Tories referred to it as the "Holy Alliance Hay Loft" in the market buildings.

=== Canadian Alliance Society ===
In January 1835, shortly after the elections, the Upper Canada Political Union was reorganized as the Canadian Alliance Society, with James Lesslie, a city Alderman, as president, and Timothy Parsons as secretary. They were also leaders in the Toronto Mechanics Institute. It was at this time that they moved into Turton's Building, built on land owned by William W. Baldwin. The Canadian Alliance Society adopted much of the platform (such as secret ballot and universal suffrage) of the Owenite National Union of the Working Classes in London, England that were to be integrated into the Chartist movement in England.

The Children of Peace immediately formed a branch of the Canadian Alliance Society in January 1835, and elected Samuel Hughes its president. This branch met every two weeks during the parliamentary session to discuss the bills before the assembly. One of their more interesting proposals was to create a petitioning campaign for a written provincial constitution; Hughes was appointed to the committee. A constitution would be the means by which "the proceedings of our government may be bounded – the legislative council rendered elective, and the government and council made responsible – and that all Eccliastics be prohibited from holding seats in the council and that no officer of the government should be irresponsible". this may have been the inspiration for the constitution Mackenzie published just before the rebellion.

==== Provincial Loan Bank ====
The first of the petition movements initiated by the Canadian Alliance Society was a call to form a "Provincial Loan Office". This was a source of loans for pioneer farmers hard pressed to meet expenses in bad years; its inspiration lay with the credit union formed by the Children of Peace in 1832. A province wide "loan office" had been discussed in the colony for more than a decade. This provincially sponsored bank would loan farmers small sums of £1 or £2 against the security of their farms. The petition called for the establishment of a loan office in each district associated with the registry office; these offices would issue "provincial loan notes" equal to twice the provincial debt which would be legal tender. These notes would be loaned in small amounts to farmers on security of their property, due in 15 years and at 6% simple interest. It offered long term credit, as opposed to the 90-day loans of the Bank of Upper Canada, and would be repaid yearly rather than quarterly, since farmers had only one crop a year to sell. As these farmers paid their yearly installments, this money would be reloaned to others, on a shorter period, so that at the end of fifteen years, the original pool of notes would provide compound interest; the profits from this compound interest would be sufficient, after expenses, to pay off the provincial debt at the end of fifteen years. The petitions were referred first to a select committee of the House of Assembly composed of Samuel Lount, Charles Duncombe, and Thomas D. Morrison; they drafted a bill, but the session ended before it could be enacted. Lount and Duncombe would be key organizers of the Rebellion of 1837.

=== Toronto Political Union ===
The Canadian Alliance Society was reborn as the Constitutional Reform Society in 1836, when it was led by the more moderate reformer, William W. Baldwin. After the disastrous 1836 elections, it took the final form as the Toronto Political Union in October 1836, again with Baldwin as president. By March 1837, however, the more moderate reformers withdrew in disappointment with their electoral loss, leaving William Lyon Mackenzie to fill the political vacuum.

The Toronto Political Union called for a Constitutional Convention in July 1837, and began organizing local "Vigilance Committees" to elect delegates. The structure of the convention was much like that of the "General Convention of Delegates in 1834, and many of the same delegates were elected. This became the organizational structure for the Rebellion of 1837.

The Toronto Political Union complained of many issues, but none more than the effects of the financial panic of 1836, and the effects of bankrupt banks like the Bank of Upper Canada suing poor farmers and other debtors.

The meetings in the Home District met with an increasing degree of Orange Order violence, so that the reformers began to protect themselves and resort to arms to do so. As the violence continued, peaceable reform meetings tapered off in October, to be replaced by instances of men drilling for battle. The Rebellion of December 7, 1837, marked the end of the Political Union movement in Upper Canada.

== Atlantic Revolution and the Rebellions of 1837 ==
The rebellions in 1837 must be viewed in the wider context of the late-18th- and early-19th-century Atlantic revolutions. The American Revolutionary War of 1775–1783, the French Revolution of 1789–1799, the Haitian Revolution of 1791–1804, the Irish Rebellion of 1798, and Spanish America (1810–1825) were all inspired by the same republican ideals. Even Great Britain's Chartists sought the same democratic goals. The Canadian rebels believed that the right of citizens to participate in the political process through the election of representatives was the most important right, and they sought to make the legislative council elective rather than appointed. When the British military crushed the rebellions, they ended any possibility the two Canadas would become republics.

=== Republicanism vs. responsible government ===
In 1838, John Lambton (Lord Durham), the author of the Great Reform Bill of 1832, arrived in the Canadas to investigate the causes of the Rebellion and make recommendations for reform of the political system. He was to recommend "responsible government", not republicanism. Historian Paul Romney has argued that the turn to "responsible government" was a strategy adopted by reformers in the face of charges of disloyalty to Britain in the wake of the Rebellions of 1837. In his view, the ascendancy of Loyalism as the dominant political ideology of Upper Canada made any demand for democracy a challenge to colonial sovereignty. Later, struggling to avoid the charge of sedition, the reformers purposefully obscured their true aims of independence from Britain and focused on their grievances against the Family Compact; responsible government thus became a "pragmatic" policy of alleviating local abuses, rather than a revolutionary anti-colonial moment. The author of this pragmatic policy was Robert Baldwin, who spent the next decade fighting for (implementation. Ironically, it was not achieved until after Baldwin and Louis-Hippolyte Lafontaine, the Premiers of the Canadas, shepherded the Rebellion Losses Bill through Parliament in 1849. It sparked Orange riots, and the burning of the Parliament buildings as much of Europe was similarly engulfed in a wave of republican revolutions and counter-revolutions.
