= John McIntosh (reformer) =

Artillery captain and Upper Canadian legislator

- Born: 4 March 1796; Colarich, Scotland
- Died: 3 July 1853 (aged 57); Toronto
- Occupations: Ship's captain, politician

John McIntosh (March 4, 1796 – July 3, 1853) was a Scottish-Canadian businessman, ship's captain and political figure in Upper Canada. He was a leading figure of the Upper Canadian reform movement, and was described by his contemporaries as a moderate reformer. He was elected to the province's legislature in 1834, but was unable to be elected to the parliament of the Province of Canada in 1841. He continued supporting reformers, allowing William Lyon Mackenzie to stay in his home upon Mackenzie's return to Canada in 1849.

== Early life and career ==
McIntosh was born in Colarich, Scotland, on March 4, 1796. His parents were John McIntosh and Ann Ferguson. He emigrated to Quebec in 1800 or 1801 with his family and moved to York, Upper Canada, in 1803. He served in the 3rd Regiment of the York militia during the War of 1812 and participated in the siege of Detroit and battle of Queenston Heights. He was captured by American forces during the Battle of York.

After the war, McIntosh piloted ships on the Great Lakes and was the caption of a schooner called The Three Brothers. He married Catharine Stewart in 1824, and they had four children together. In 1828, McIntosh was given property by his father. He rented out these properties and a farm in London, and these profits allowed him to devote more time to politics.

== Provincial politics ==
In the 1830s, McIntosh was chairman of the Committee of House District Reformers. From 1832–1833 McIntosh was chairman of the Central Committee of One Hundred Freeholders of Upper Canada, a group that organized opposition to the provincial government of Upper Canada. In 1833 McIntosh married his second wife, Helen Ferguson (née Baxter) and they would have at least seven children together. In 1834, McIntosh was elected in the 4th riding of York as a Reformer to the Upper Canadian legislature. He was reelected in 1836. He chaired a meeting in 1837 where Toronto reformers called on Upper Canadians to organize groups to oppose the provincial administration. In the fall of 1837, Mackenzie invited McIntosh to a meeting of reformers where Mackenzie proposed the Upper Canada Rebellion. Mackenzie's proposal was rejected and McIntosh did not participate in the rebellion.

In 1841 McIntosh ran for the 1st Parliament of the Province of Canada in the 4th riding of York. Reformers asked McIntosh to not run in the election and Robert Baldwin declared his intention to run in the same seat. McIntosh refused to quit the race so his reform colleague could be more easily elected and did not attend the election hustings in Newmarket. Baldwin won the election without opposition. Baldwin was also elected in Hastings, so a by-election was called in the riding and McIntosh stood as a candidate again. He attended the hustings but was defeated by Louis-Hippolyte Lafontaine in a vote of 186-52.

In 1849, he allowed William Lyon Mackenzie to stay at his home upon Mackenzie's return to Toronto. That evening a mob assembled at the McIntosh property and burned an effigy of Mackenzie. McIntosh asked the Toronto City Council for help protecting him and his property. Many city councilors suggested that McIntosh should ask Mackenzie to leave his home, and the council passed a declaration saying the people would only be rioting at McIntosh's home if they were "deeply insulted" over the situation.

Reformers encouraged McIntosh to run in the 1851 provincial election in the 4th riding of York, but McIntosh decided to support the Reform candidate Joseph Hartman.

McIntosh was ill in the last years of his life, limiting his political activities. He died in Toronto on July 3, 1853.

== Philosophy and views ==
McIntosh was a reformer, a philosophy he obtained from his father. He supported William Lyon Mackenzie's political career but did not agree with Mackenzie's radical ideas. He supported incremental improvements to policies and was considered a moderate reformer by his contemporaries. He opposed the union of Upper and Lower Canada into the Province of Canada.

McIntosh was a Presbyterian.

== Works cited ==
- Gates, Lillian F. (1996). After the Rebellion: The Later Years of William Lyon Mackenzie. Dundurn Press. ISBN 978-1-55488-069-0.
- Johnson, J. K. (1989). Becoming Prominent: Regional Leadership in Upper Canada, 1791-1841. Kingston: McGill-Queen's University Press. ISBN 0-7735-0641-1.
- Schrauwers, Albert (2009). Union is Strength: W.L. Mackenzie, the Children of Peace and the Emergence of Joint Stock Democracy in Upper Canada. Toronto: University of Toronto Press. ISBN 978-0-8020-9927-3.
