= David Willson (Quaker) =

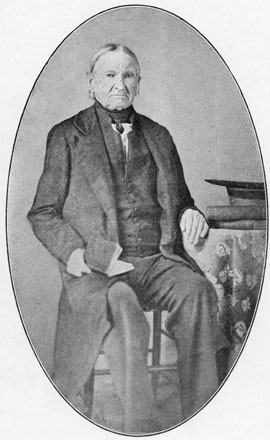
- David Wilson, ca 1866 Reform Leaders: William Lyon Mackenzie; James Lesslie; David Willson
- Born: 7 June 1778; Millbrook, Dutchess County, New York
- Died: 14 January 1866 (aged 87); Sharon, Ontario
- Occupation(s): minister, reform politician
- Known for: Sharon Temple

David Willson (1778–1866) was a religious and political leader who founded the Quaker sect known as, 'The Children of Peace' or 'Davidites,' based at Sharon (formerly Hope) in York County, Upper Canada in 1812. As the primary minister to this group, he led them in constructing a series of remarkable buildings, the best known of which is the Sharon Temple, now a National Historic Site of Canada. A prolific writer, sympathizer and leader of the movement for political reform in Upper Canada, Willson, together with his followers, ensured the election of William Lyon Mackenzie, and both "fathers of Responsible Government", Robert Baldwin and Louis LaFontaine, in their riding.

== Biography ==
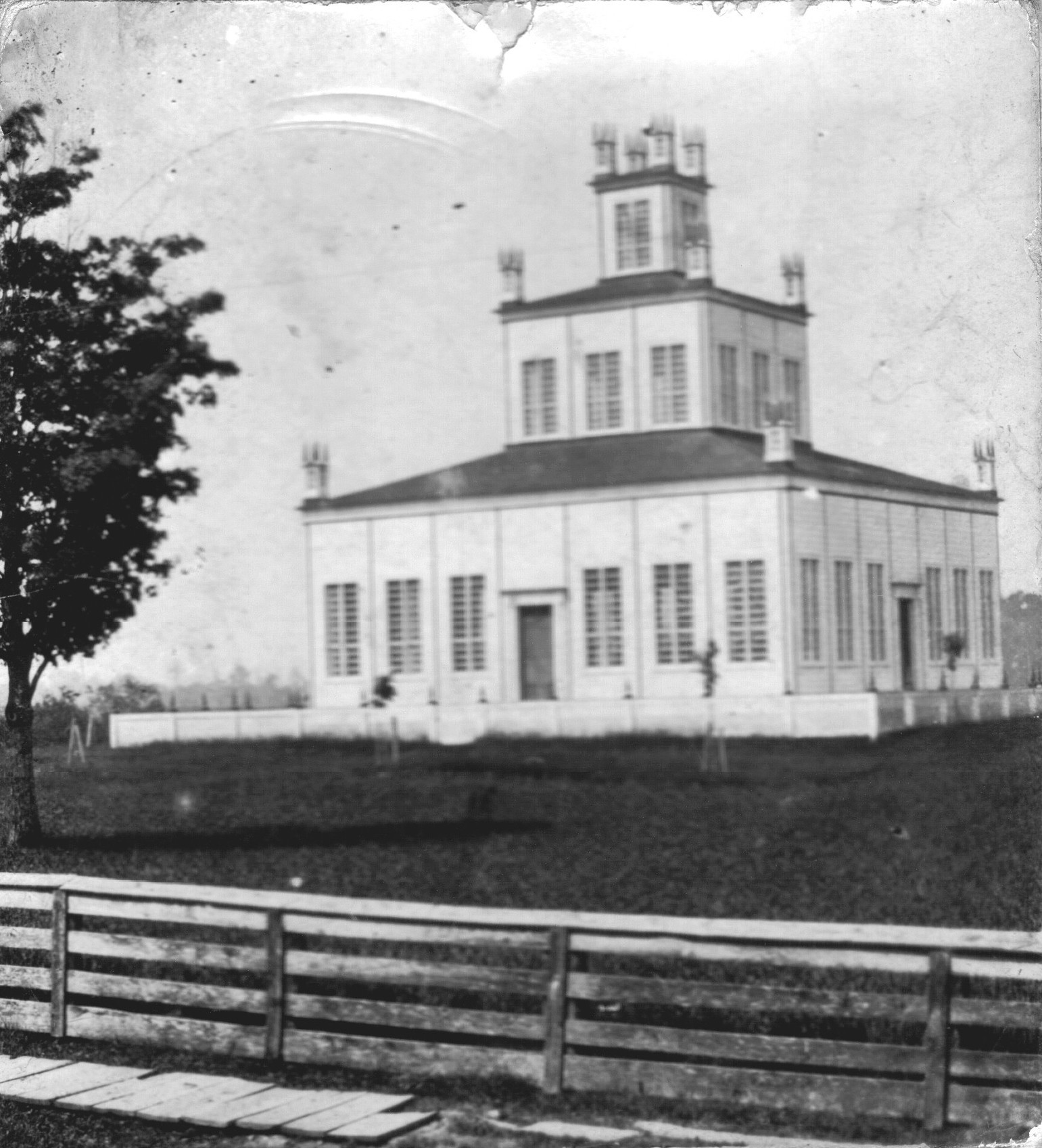
Sharon Temple National Historic Site

=== Early life ===
Born on his parents' rented farm on the Nine Partners' Grant in Dutchess County, New York, Willson was the son of Irish immigrant John Willson (died circa 1794) and his second wife Catherine (1754-1840). David Willson would later describe his parents as having been 'poor but pious Presbyterians'. Following his father's death David Willson lived for a time in New York City and sailed on the Farmer, a sloop in which his family had invested. He married Phebe Titus (1777-1866), a member of the Society of Friends, for which she was initially disowned. In 1801, age 23, David Willson and other members of his family, including his widowed mother, younger brother, John (b.1781), and sisters Anne (1786-1824) and Mary (c.1792-1858), followed the example of his elder half brother, Hugh (1768-1828), and emigrated to Upper Canada. They settled in East Gwillimbury Township in York County.

Willson joined the Yonge Street Meeting of the Society of Friends (in what is now Newmarket) in 1805, and "served them according to their laws and discipline for seven years in all good faith and practice of the society, [yet] still retaining [his] secret impressions as sacred from the ears of all flesh." Quakers adhered to a strict "Discipline" on their behaviour, but had no fixed creed. Ministry was spontaneous, as called by the "inner light" of God who made "secret impressions" on the believers mind. During this period, Willson did not minister, but served as an active overseer and record keeper, as well as donating the land for a meeting house (church) on his farm.

Willson underwent a spiritual transformation in 1812 that led to him, and several of his sympathizers, being expelled from the Society of Friends. Willson was particularly concerned to take up the Society's peace testimony "from where George Fox (the founder of Quakerism) left it, and raise it so high, that all the Kingdoms of the Earth should see it." He established 'The Children of Peace,' which espoused ideas and doctrines at odds with orthodox Quaker beliefs; in particular, he was accused of denying the divinity of Christ.

=== Minister to the Children of Peace ===
The sect was centred upon the Willson farm and Willson increasingly became the main spiritual and community leader. Involvement in Reform politics brought Willson and his community into direct conflict with the political establishment of the province, in particular Bishop John Strachan of Toronto.

Much of Willson's belief and behaviour cannot be understood except in reaction to the government-supported "hireling clergy" of the colonial Church of England. Willson's refusal to accept a salary as a minister stood out against the Anglican control of the funds from the Clergy Reserves, the special grant of one seventh of all land in the province rented out for the support of the "official" Church. He dressed in rags in imitation of Christ, and in contrast to the expected demeanour of an ordained minister of God's word. His pride in his lack of formal schooling — "my education was bounded by one year, and a considerable part of that time almost in my infancy" — was in sharp contrast to the university education of the Anglican clergy.

Willson was a homespun preacher: a man of the people and defender of their interests against the tightly knit establishment of merchants, official clergy and government. This "Family Compact" in turn accused him of losing "sight of affairs of a spiritual nature and expiating upon those of a worldly sort." An extension of his concern for the poor was his efforts to build a cooperative economy in the village of Hope that he had founded. Many of the new settlers in the province, immigrants from the south infused with republican idealism, found in Willson a palatable, if somewhat eccentric, alternative to the aristocratic pretensions of the British Colonial administration and the closely associated Church of England.

During the 1830s, he was described as of "middle stature, about sixty years of age, a healthy looking man; he squints much, and has a flat heavy appearance. He, in common with the whole of the sect, wears a homespun blueish mixture: his walk is peculiar, - he appears to move as if he were pulling his legs after him; his speech has a strong nasal twang."

=== Reform politician ===
==== Party organizer ====
Although captivated by visions of equality, the Children of Peace lived in an autocratic colony. They inspired other settlers to fight for democracy within a loose-knit "Reform Movement" of disenchanted farmers and tradesmen. David Willson had long been an active political figure ensuring the election of William Lyon Mackenzie in their Riding.

Mackenzie travelled to England to petition his unjust expulsion from the Legislative Assembly in 1832. He returned in the last week of August, 1833, to find his appeals to the British Parliament had been ultimately ineffective. At an emergency meeting of Reformers, David Willson proposed extending the nomination process for members of the House of Assembly they had begun in Hope to all four Ridings of York, and to establish a "General Convention of Delegates" from each riding in which to establish a common political platform. This convention could then become the core of a "permanent convention" or political party - an innovation not yet seen in Upper Canada. The organization of this convention was a model for the "Constitutional Convention" Mackenzie organized for the Rebellion of 1837, where many of the same delegates were to attend.

The Convention was held on 27 February 1834 with delegates from all four of the York ridings. The week before, Mackenzie published Willson's call for a "standing convention" (political party). The day of the convention, the Children of Peace led a "Grand Procession" with their choir and band (the first civilian band in the province) to the Old Court House where the convention was held. David Willson was the main speaker before the convention and "he addressed the meeting with great force and effect". The convention nominated 4 Reform candidates, all of whom were ultimately successful in the election. The convention stopped short, however, of establishing a political party. Instead, they formed yet another Political Union, the Canadian Alliance Society. It was a petitioning organization. The first of the petition movements initiated by the Canadian Alliance Society was a call to form a "Provincial Loan Office." This was a source of loans for pioneer farmers hard pressed to meet expenses in bad years; its inspiration lay with the credit union formed by the Children of Peace in 1832.

As several members of Willson's sect, including two of his sons, participated in the armed rebellion in 1837, there was some discussion of destroying the community's meeting houses and its iconic Sharon Temple. Willson remained a key political leader in the Fourth Riding of York, a Riding that was to rise to national importance for electing both "fathers of Responsible Government", Robert Baldwin and Louis LaFontaine. These men led the fight for independence from colonial rule and an independent legislature.

==== Struggle for responsible government ====
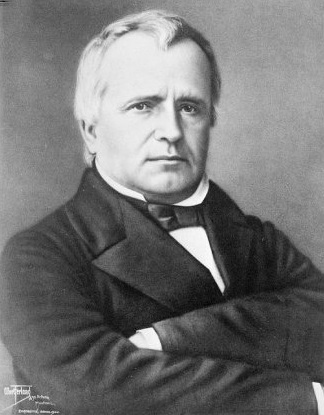
Louis-Hypolite LaFontaine, Father of Responsible Government

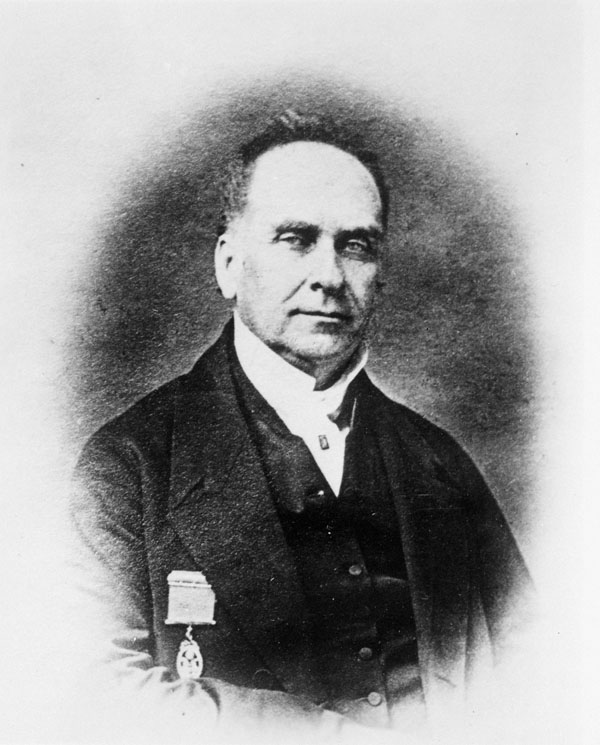
Robert Baldwin, Father of Responsible Government

Willson managed Baldwin's election in 4th York and he 'walked over the course without a contest,' thus becoming the first member to be elected to the United Parliament of the Province of Canada. He was also later returned in Hastings. Although Baldwin was elected in two seats in Canada West, reformers were in the minority. In Canada East, gerrymandering and Orange Order violence were used to prevent the election of Louis-Hippolyte LaFontaine, leader of the French reformers in Terrebonne, outside Montreal. In order to ensure LaFontaine a seat, Baldwin proposed to Willson that they nominate LaFontaine for the seat in 4th York.

On 3 September 1841, Willson and the Children of Peace held a campaign rally for Baldwin and LaFontaine in their Temple, where they rejoiced "to say that we have it in our power to show our impartial respect to the Canadian people of the Lower Province." Despite threats of Orange Order violence, LaFontaine was elected as representative of 4th York.

However, before LaFontaine could take up his seat, Governor Sydenham died. His replacement, Sir Charles Bagot, was not able to form a mixed cabinet of Reformers and Tories, and so he was forced to include the "French party" under LaFontaine. LaFontaine refused to join the Executive Council unless Baldwin was also included. Bagot was finally forced to accede in September 1842, and when he became severely ill thereafter, Baldwin and Lafontaine became the first real premiers of the Province of Canada. In order to take office as ministers, the two had to run for re-election. While LaFontaine was easily re-elected in 4th York, Baldwin lost his seat in Hastings as a result of Orange Order violence. It was now that the pact between the two men was completely solidified, as LaFontaine arranged for Baldwin to run in Rimouski, Canada East. This was the union of the Canadas they sought, where LaFontaine overcame linguistic prejudice to gain a seat in English Canada, and Baldwin obtained his seat in French Canada.

They resigned in November 1843, beginning a constitutional crisis that would last a year. This year-long crisis, in which the legislature was prorogued, "was the final signpost on Upper Canada’s conceptual road to democracy. Lacking the scale of the American Revolution, it nonetheless forced a comparable articulation and rethinking of the basics of political dialogue in the province."

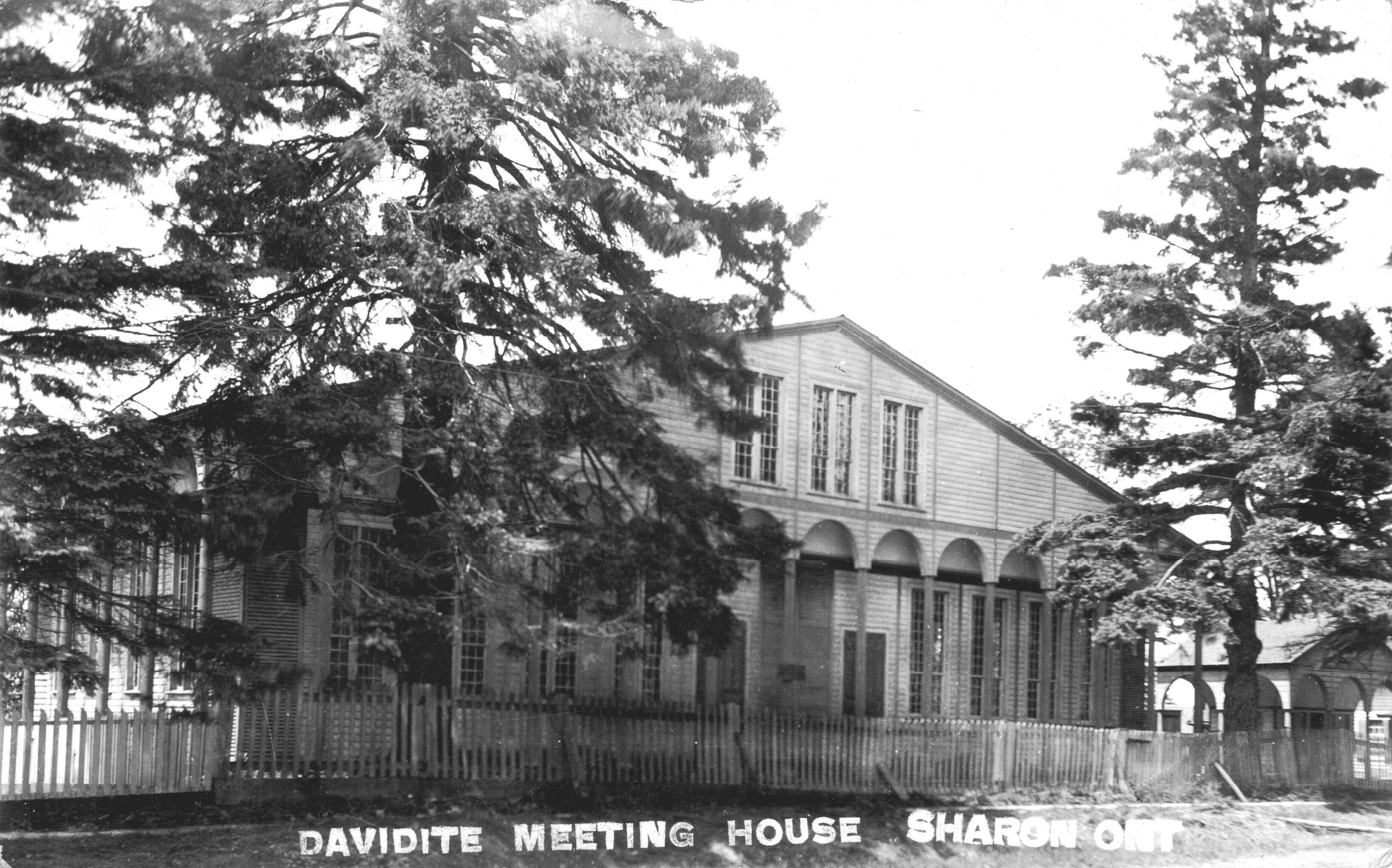
The Second Meeting House, Sharon, where the Reform Association met June, 1844.

Baldwin and LaFontaine's administration was forced to resign in 1843. Baldwin now established a "Reform Association" in February, 1844, to unite the Reform movement in Canada West to explain their understanding of responsible government before the expected election. Twenty-two branches were established. A grand meeting of all branches of the Reform Association was held in the Second Meeting House of the Children of Peace in Sharon. It was ultimately to serve as the springboard for Baldwin's successful candidacy in 4th York. Baldwin had been at a loss about where to run after his loss in Hastings. Orange mobs continued to rule out any chance in Hastings, or in 2nd York, where he had lost to Orange leader George Duggan. LaFontaine, in yet another act of friendship, gave up his seat representing 4th York, thus allowing the desperate Baldwin to run there. David Willson, having arranged for the Reform Association rally during the illumination ceremony, now became Baldwin's campaign manager. It was reported that over three thousand people attended this June rally for Baldwin.

Having weathered these storms the sect continued although changing demographics, the establishment of other religious denominations and other factors led to the sect's gradual decline. Following Willson's death in 1866 the sect continued until ceasing to function by the end of the 1880s.

== Theologian and hymnodist ==
As an offshoot of the Society of Friends, the Children of Peace shared most Quaker belief, especially in the innate presence of God (the "inner light") in every person. Like the Quakers, they practiced a spontaneous ministry, and eschewed a "hireling clergy." David Willson was thus never their paid minister, and he never, in fact, entered the Temple during the monthly alms ceremony there. Like the Quakers, they also rejected any written creed or tests of faith: "We have no written creed, and therefore we have no image to quarrel about, or literal rule to argue for, we are against nobody, but for all."

Willson, however, did receive "impressions on the mind", visions calling him to "ornament the Christian Church with the glory of Israel." He interpreted this as a call to rebuild Solomon's Temple as the new Jerusalem. During the 1830s, his preaching became more millenarian, prophesying the coming of a Messiah who would overthrow the British empire and establish God's kingdom on earth. He viewed his small group as the new Israelites lost in the wilderness of Upper Canada, who the new Messiah would come to lead. These views are most clearly expressed in two works published in 1835, Impressions of the Mind and Letters to the Jews.

After the Rebellion of 1837, Willson's theological work became more quietist, focusing on the experience of God in the individual believer's mind. This emphasis is found in Mysteries of the Mind (1858).

Willson had been writing hymn stanzas since the inception of his ministry in 1812. These were recorded in manuscript "Books of Sacred Record". After the Children of Peace shifted musical styles to congregational singing, Willson produced a series of hymnals for the group.

== Bibliography of works ==
- "The rights of Christ according to the principles and doctrines of the Children of Peace" (Philadelphia: n.p. 1815).
- "A Lesson of Instruction, written and published for the Children of Peace" (Reading, PA: George Getz, 1816).
- "A Testimony to the People Called Quakers" (n.p., 1816)
- "An Address to the Professors of Religion" (New York: George Largin, 1817).
- "A Present to the Teachers and Rulers of Society" (Philadelphia: n.p., 1821)
- "The impressions of the mind: to which are added some remarks on church and state discipline, and the acting principles of life" (Toronto: J.H. Lawrence, 1835).
- "Letters to the Jews" (Toronto: W.J. Coates, 1835).
- "Moral and religious precepts, church ordinances, and the principles of civil government" (Toronto: W.J. Coates, 1836).
- "The Sinner's Friend, or Guide to Life" (Toronto, W.J. Coates, 1836) (This work was re-printed in "The Practical Life of the Author" (1860)).
- "Hymns and Prayers for the Children of Sharon: To be sung in worship on the Sabbath Days" (Newmarket: G.S. Porter, 1846).
- "Hymns and prayers, adapted to the worship of God, in Sharon" (Newmarket: G.S. Porter, 1848).
- "Hymns of praise: containing doctrine and prayer, adapted to the worship of God in Sharon" (Newmarket: G.S. Porter, 1853).
- "Sacred impressions of the mind, in praise and prayer, devoted to God in worship by the Children of Peace in Sharon" (1853)
- "Mysteries of the mind, or, Operations of grace" (Toronto: Leader and Steam Press, 1858)
- "The practical life of the author: from the year 1801 to 1860" (Newmarket: Erastus Jackson, 1860).

== Sources ==
- Dictionary of Canadian Biography
- McIntyre, William John; Children of Peace (Montreal: McGill-Queen's Press, 1994).
- Schrauwers, Albert; Awaiting the millennium: the Children of Peace and the Village of Hope, 1812-1889 (Toronto: University of Toronto Press, 1993).
- Schrauwers, Albert; Union is Strength: William Lyon Mackenzie, the Children of Peace, and the Emergence of Joint Stock Democracy in Upper Canada. (Toronto: University of Toronto Press, 2009).
