= Responsible government =

Concept of parliamentary democracy

Responsible government is a conception of a system of government that embodies the principle of parliamentary accountability, the foundation of the Westminster system of parliamentary democracy. Governments (the executive branch) in a Westminster democracy are responsible (politically accountable) to their parliament (the legislative branch) rather than to a monarch, president (in a republican context), or imperial government (in a colonial context). If the parliament is bicameral, then the government is usually primarily responsible to the lower house, which is more representative than the upper house, as it usually has more members and they are always directly elected.

Responsible government and the principle of parliamentary accountability manifests itself in several ways. Firstly, ministers must account to parliament for their decisions and for the performance of their departments. This requirement to make announcements and to answer questions in parliament means that ministers must have the privileges of the floor, which are only granted to those who are members of parliament. Secondly, and most importantly, although ministers are officially appointed by the authority of the head of state and can theoretically be dismissed at the pleasure of the sovereign, they concurrently retain their office subject to their holding the confidence of the lower house of parliament. When the lower house has passed a motion of no confidence in the government, the government must ordinarily immediately resign or submit itself to the electorate in a new general election.

Lastly, the head of state is in turn required to effectuate their executive power only through these responsible ministers. They must never attempt to set up a shadow government of executives or advisors and attempt to use them as instruments of government, or to rely upon their unofficial advice. They generally are not permitted to take any action under the color of their executive power without that action being as a result of the counsel and advisement of their responsible ministers. Common exceptions to this rule include emergency or wartime acts of necessity and the granting of certain state honours. Their ministers are required to counsel them (i.e., explain to them and be sure they understand any issue that they will be called upon to decide) and to form and have recommendations for them (i.e., their advice or advisement) to choose from, which are the ministers' formal, reasoned recommendations as to what course of action should be taken.

== History in the British Empire and Commonwealth ==
From the middle of the 19th century, under pressure from advocates of reform and democracy in its settler colonies, the United Kingdom began to introduce systems of responsible government to colonial governments including in Canada, Newfoundland, Australia, New Zealand and South Africa. These systems had similarities to the system that had historically developed in the United Kingdom, with a bicameral legislature and an executive responsible to the Lower House. The British House of Commons had gradually developed mechanisms for controlling the executive, including the possibility of legally impeaching ministers and the possibility of denying supply to the government. As a result, no British monarch attempted to appoint a prime minister contrary to the will of the House after a final attempt in 1834-1835. By the early twentieth century, a constitutional custom had emerged restricting British monarchs from using almost all of their powers except in accordance with binding advice from responsible ministers.

Indeed, partly to make their proposals sound more appealing, advocates of reform frequently stressed similarities between their ideas and British customs. However, because the franchise was more limited in Britain than some colonies, such as the Canadas, the achievement of responsible government sometimes produced a level of democracy not yet matched in Britain. Further, the constitutional conventions of responsible government and binding ministerial advice were still only gradually emerging in nineteenth-century Britain.

=== Canada ===
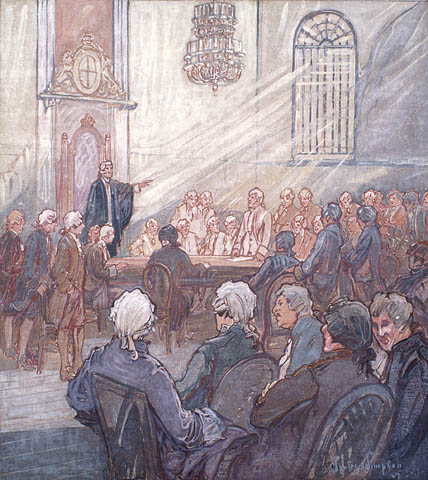
The Legislative Assembly of Lower Canada in 1792. Elective assemblies existed in British North America since the 18th century, although the colonies' executive councils were not beholden to them.

Responsible government was implemented in several colonies of British North America (present-day Canada), between 1848 and 1855, with the executive council formulating policy with the assistance of the legislative branch, which voted approval or disapproval, and the appointed governor formally enacting those policies that the legislature had approved. This replaced the previous system, whereby the governor took advice from an executive council and used the legislature chiefly to raise money or pass legislation.

Under responsible government, the executive is also a part of the legislature. The executive branch must consist of members of parliament. Responsible government not only secured democracy in Canada, but was a major element of Canada's gradual development toward independence. The concept of responsible government is associated in Canada more with self-government than with parliamentary accountability; hence, there is the notion that the Dominion of Newfoundland "gave up responsible government" when it suspended its self-governing status in 1933, as a result of financial problems. It did not regain responsible government until it became a province of Canada in 1949.

==== Background ====
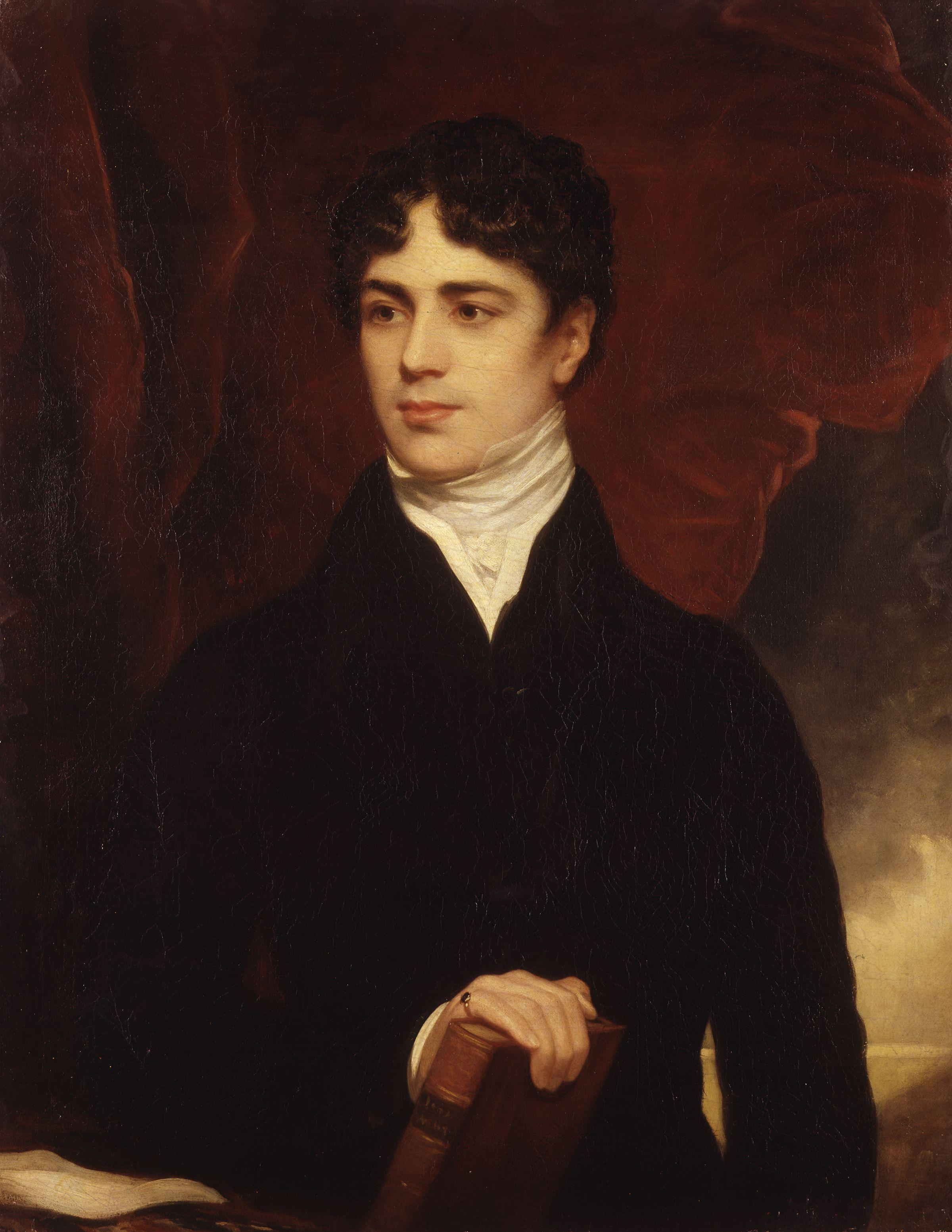
The Earl of Durham, Governor General of British North America, made a report shortly after the 1837–38 rebellions that recommended the implementation of responsible government.

At first appointed governors and appointed members who filled the governors' executive councils held power in Canada. Even after the formation of elected legislative assemblies, starting with Nova Scotia in 1758, governors and their executive councils did not require the consent of elected legislators in order to carry out all their roles and govern. In the aftermath of the American Revolution, sparked by the perceived shortcomings of virtual representation, the British government became sensitive to unrest in its remaining colonies with large populations of European-descended colonists. Elected assemblies were introduced to both Upper Canada and Lower Canada with the Constitutional Act 1791. However, the legislative assemblies in the Canadas had limited control over revenue, so the executive government could afford to defy or ignore the assemblies. Government positions were monopolised by elite groups, the Family Compact and Château Clique, who used these positions to advance their personal and family interests. The Tories in Nova Scotia displayed similarly corrupt behaviour.

As tensions grew in both Upper and Lower Canada between the assemblies and the executive, many reformers called for the assemblies to have some control over the executive power. Notably, in 1828, William Warren Baldwin, a Reform movement leader from Upper Canada, proposed that executive councillors should be responsible, meaning that they should be removed upon losing the people's confidence. The assembly of Lower Canada received substantial additional power over revenue in 1831, which the reformist Patriotes eventually used to deny funding to the executive government until their demands, including influence over the executive government, were met. However, the governor and executive refused to implement these reforms and instead arrested Patriote leaders, leading to the Rebellions of 1837–1838.

After the rebellions, the Earl of Durham was appointed governor general of British North America, with the task of examining the issues and determining how to defuse tensions. Durham openly pronounced French Canadians "inferior" to Anglophones and did not intend for them to participate substantially in the new political system he envisioned, nor did he consult them in creating his report. However, Durham spoke with Anglophone Reformers, including William Warren Baldwin and Robert Baldwin, who argued that he should introduce responsible government. Meanwhile, Francis Hincks' newspaper, The Examiner, advocated for responsible government. Accordingly, in his report, Durham recommended that colonies that were developed enough should be granted responsible government. This term specifically meant the policy that British-appointed governors should bow to the will of elected colonial assemblies. Elected legislators gained some power to rein in the appointed executive council.

==== Implementation ====
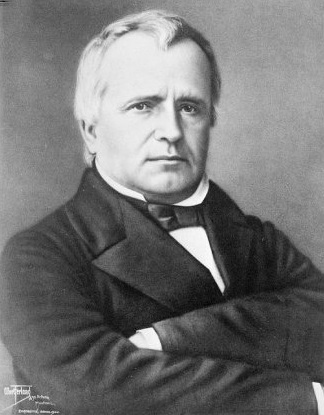
Louis-Hippolyte Lafontaine

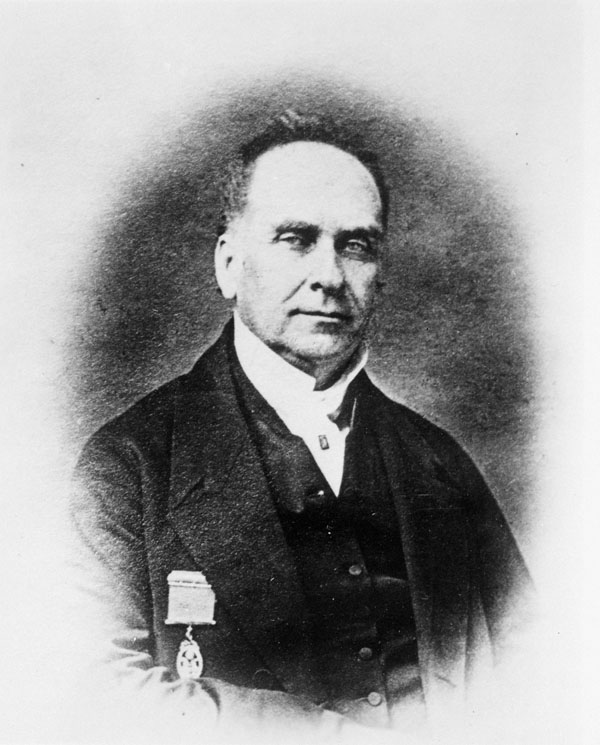
Robert Baldwin

As leaders of the Reformers in Canada East and West respectively, Lafontaine and Baldwin campaigned for and led the first responsible government in the Canadas

Indeed, some sources suggest that responsible government itself was fully or partly in place as early as 1841 or 1842 in the Canadas. Notably, the government was led by a premier, and Premier Draper promised in 1841 that he would resign if he lost the confidence of the House. The next year, this indeed led to Reformer Louis-Hippolyte Lafontaine replacing Draper. On the other hand, this did not reflect the full principle of collective ministerial responsibility characteristic of responsible government, but an individual form of ministerial responsibility. That is, the House could remove individual ministers, but the ministers were not yet a cohesive body responsible to the House as a group. Responsible government was only unquestionably achieved when the executive council was formed of members exclusively from the party (or coalition of parties) commanding the support of a majority in the representative branch of a colonial legislature, and when the governor was expected to follow the advice of that responsible executive council.

Moreover, Durham's support for responsible government was not shared by everyone: for example, the Lieutenant Governor of Upper Canada, Sir Francis Bond Head, wrote in one dispatch to London that, if responsible government were implemented, "democracy, in the worst possible form, will prevail in our colonies." In 1839, the British colonial secretary, John Russell, instructed the new Governor General Sydenham that responsible government should not be implemented because, if the colonial governors were bound to follow the advice of executive councils responsible to local legislatures, they could not follow the directions of the British government. In the 1841 elections, decades before the introduction of the secret ballot, Sydenham used gerrymandering and organized political violence in an effort to influence the outcome against the Reformers. After arriving in Canada in 1843, Governor General Charles Metcalfe entered into numerous disputes with Lafontaine's government, for example when he unilaterally made patronage appointments, which ultimately led almost all of the ministers to resign in protest, whereupon Metcalfe prorogued parliament for almost a year. Thus, it is generally accepted that responsible government was not yet in force in the Canadas in the early 1840s.

In their common struggle against imperial resistance to full responsible government, Robert Baldwin's Anglophone Reformers forged an alliance with their Francophone counterparts under Lafontaine, thwarting Durham's plan to marginalize and assimilate French Canadians. When supporters of Sydenham and the government used violence and intimidation to prevent Lafontaine's supporters from voting for him in his intended seat in the 1841 election, this defeat provided an opportunity for reformers to cement their alliance across linguistic, sectarian, and (in the language of the times) racial divides. Robert and William Warren Baldwin arranged for Lafontaine to run in an upcoming byelection in an Anglophone Protestant riding from Canada West, and Lafontaine was elected there with a large majority. This helped reassure French Canadians anxious about the intentions of the Anglophone reformers. When Robert Baldwin later lost his seat due to similar violence, the French Canadian reformers reciprocated the gesture: one of their members resigned so that Baldwin could obtain a seat in Canada East.

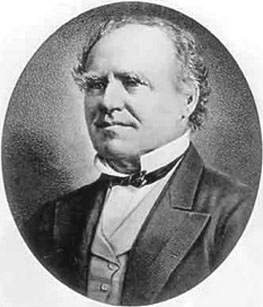
Joseph Howe, who led the campaign for responsible government in Nova Scotia

Meanwhile, another push for responsible government was underway in Nova Scotia, through the efforts of Joseph Howe and other Reformers. Howe's push for responsible government was inspired partly by the work of Thomas McCulloch and Jotham Blanchard almost two decades earlier. Furthermore, Howe had followed the proposals and demands of the Canadian Reformers and had begun to speak of the need for some form of government responsibility to the people in the 1830s. However, Howe did not yet mean responsible government in the modern sense of the term. One option he was considering was the creation of an elected legislative council separate from the executive council; Howe initially rejected the Canadian Reformers' efforts to make the executive power responsible to the legislative assembly. The publication of Durham's report changed Howe's view, and encouraged him and the Nova Scotian Reformers to focus on seeking responsible government at the executive level. Though Howe was more open to compromise than the Canadian Reformers, relations between the Nova Scotia Reformers and the lieutenant governor nevertheless broke down to the point that Howe commented that the governor ought to be horsewhipped.

In late 1846, a new Britsh government, desiring to reduce the costs of empire and recognising that its rule could not be maintained against local opinion, instructed colonial governors to abandon the policy of resistance against advocates of responsible government. Thus, when the new Nova Scotia legislative session began in January 1848 after the Reformers' success in the August 1847 election, the Reformers were soon able to achieve the first instance of responsible government in the British Empire outside of the United Kingdom itself. The plaque erected by the Historic Sites and Monuments Board of Canada in the Nova Scotia House of Assembly reads:

First Responsible Government in the British Empire.
The first executive council chosen exclusively from the party having a majority in the representative branch of a colonial legislature was formed in Nova Scotia on 2 February 1848. Following a vote of want of confidence in the preceding council, James Boyle Uniacke, who had moved the resolution, became attorney general and leader of the government. Joseph Howe, the long-time campaigner for this "peaceable revolution", became provincial secretary. Other members of the council were Hugh Bell, Wm.F. Desbarres, Lawrence O.C. Doyle, Herbert Huntingdon, James McNab, Michael Tobin, and George R. Young.

Almost immediately, the new government faced renewed resistance when the British colonial secretary, the Earl Grey, rejected some of the new Reformer government's legislation, even arguing it should have been sent to his office for approval before being put to the provincial legislature. Howe and the Reformers protested that this made the government's responsibility to the assembly ineffectual, and Grey eventually relented from some of his demands.

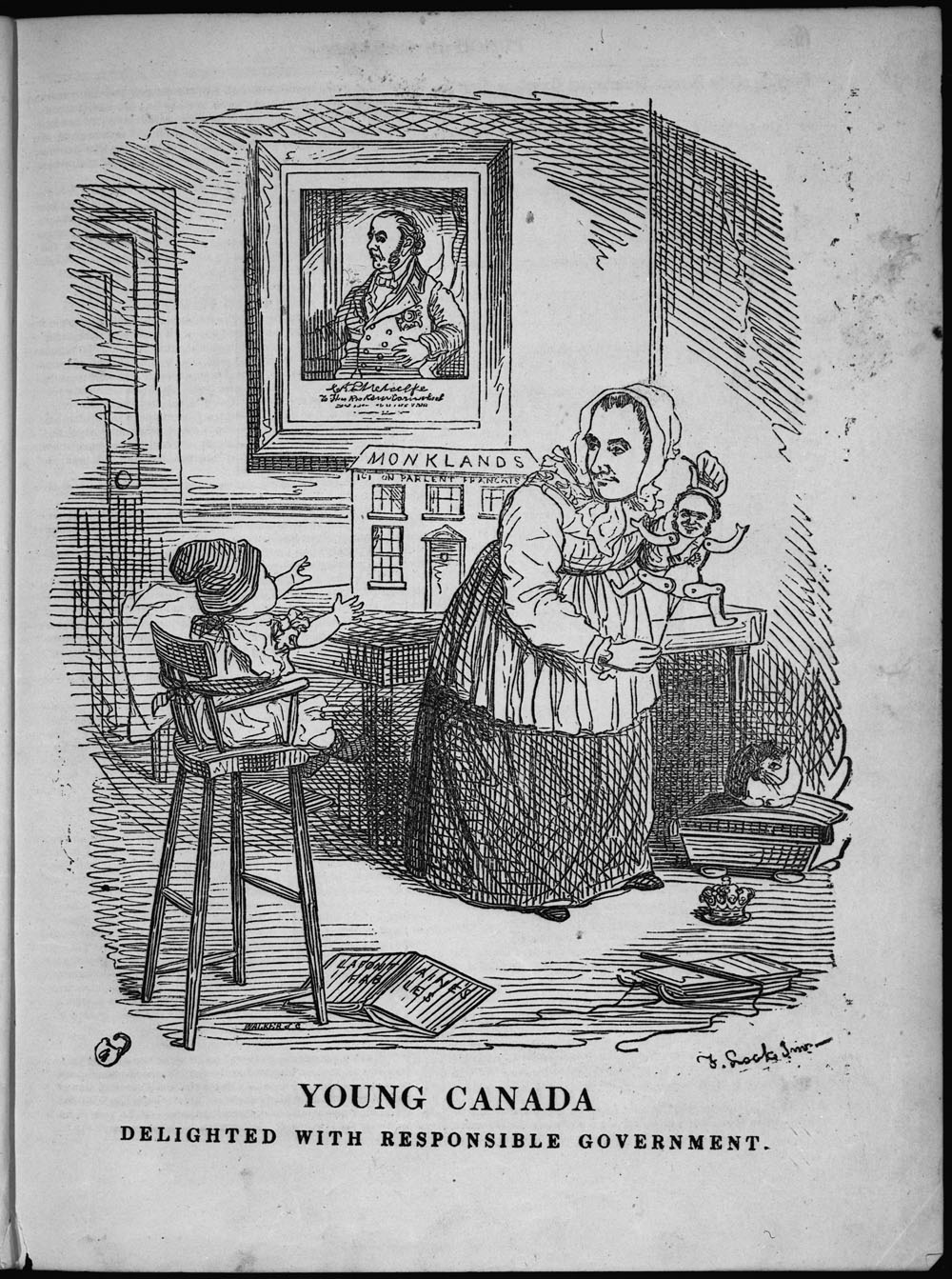
A political cartoon from Punch in Canada, in 1849, depicting a "young Canada" being delighted by Lord Elgin pulling the strings of a puppet, representing responsible government

In the Province of Canada, responsible government was introduced following the decisive victory of the Reformers in the 1848 elections. The governor general, Lord Elgin, swore in the Reform ministry of Louis-Hippolyte Lafontaine and Robert Baldwin on 11 March 1848. It was put to the test in the following year, when Reformers in the legislature passed the Rebellion Losses Bill, which provided compensation to French-Canadians who suffered losses during the Rebellions of 1837–1838. Elgin had serious misgivings about the bill, but, nonetheless assented to it, despite demands from the Tories that he refuse to do so. Elgin was physically assaulted by an English-speaking mob for this and the parliament building in Montreal was burned to the ground in the ensuing riots. Nonetheless, the Rebellion Losses Bill helped entrench responsible government into Canadian politics. Moreover, Canadian philosopher John Ralston Saul argues that the restraint shown by Lafontaine and Baldwin's government in response to the riots was characteristic of the binational Reform movement championing responsible government in Canada, fundamentally distinguishing it from the more violent and nationalistic revolutionary movements common in Europe and the United States.

Responsible government is sometimes considered to have been introduced in New Brunswick around the same time, in February 1848, when the house resolved to endorse responsible government. In April, the new Lieutenant Governor Edmund Walker Head arrived with a mandate to introduce responsible government, and in May, Head brought in a more balanced representation of members of the Legislative Assembly to the Executive Council and ceded more powers to that body. However, the executive government was in practice able to organize its finances with little responsibility, and the governor ignored the Executive Council's advice regarding judicial appointments. Thus, many sources consider that responsible government in New Brunswick was not properly introduced until after the government changed in 1854.

In time, the granting of responsible government became the first step on the road to complete independence. Indeed, John Ralston Saul suggests that the fundamental building blocks of Canada's democratic federalism were established through the achievement of responsible government, not at Confederation. Canada gradually gained greater autonomy through inter imperial and Commonwealth diplomacy, including the British North America Act, 1867; the Statute of Westminster, 1931; and the patriation of the Constitution Act, 1982.

=== Australia and New Zealand ===
Prior to European colonisation, the Australian continent was inhabited by Aboriginal and Torres Strait Island peoples, who had their own traditional forms of self-government. They were divided into various nations and clans and, in some cases, large alliances between several nations. In 1770, Royal Navy officer James Cook sailed along the east coast of Australia and claimed it for King George III. Nearly two decades later, in 1788 the First Fleet led by Arthur Phillip established the first permanent European settlement in Australia at Port Jackson. The settlers gradually expanded across the continent, displacing the indigenous population, until they had established six colonies; the legal system of these colonies were based on the common law system.

At first, the Australian colonies were run by autocratic governors. They were appointed by the British monarch, but in practice the governors exercised vast executive and legislative powers with very little oversight. Several factors influenced this: most of these early colonies were penal colonies, they were at a great distance from the United Kingdom and communication was slow. In addition the continent was of enormous size and the Australian colonies were largely unexplored by Europeans and sparsely settled by them.

In 1808 a military coup d'état known as the Rum Rebellion deposed Governor Bligh and briefly established military rule over the Colony of New South Wales until a new Governor (Lachlan Macquarie) was appointed and sent from Britain. This did not aid in establishing responsible or representative government.

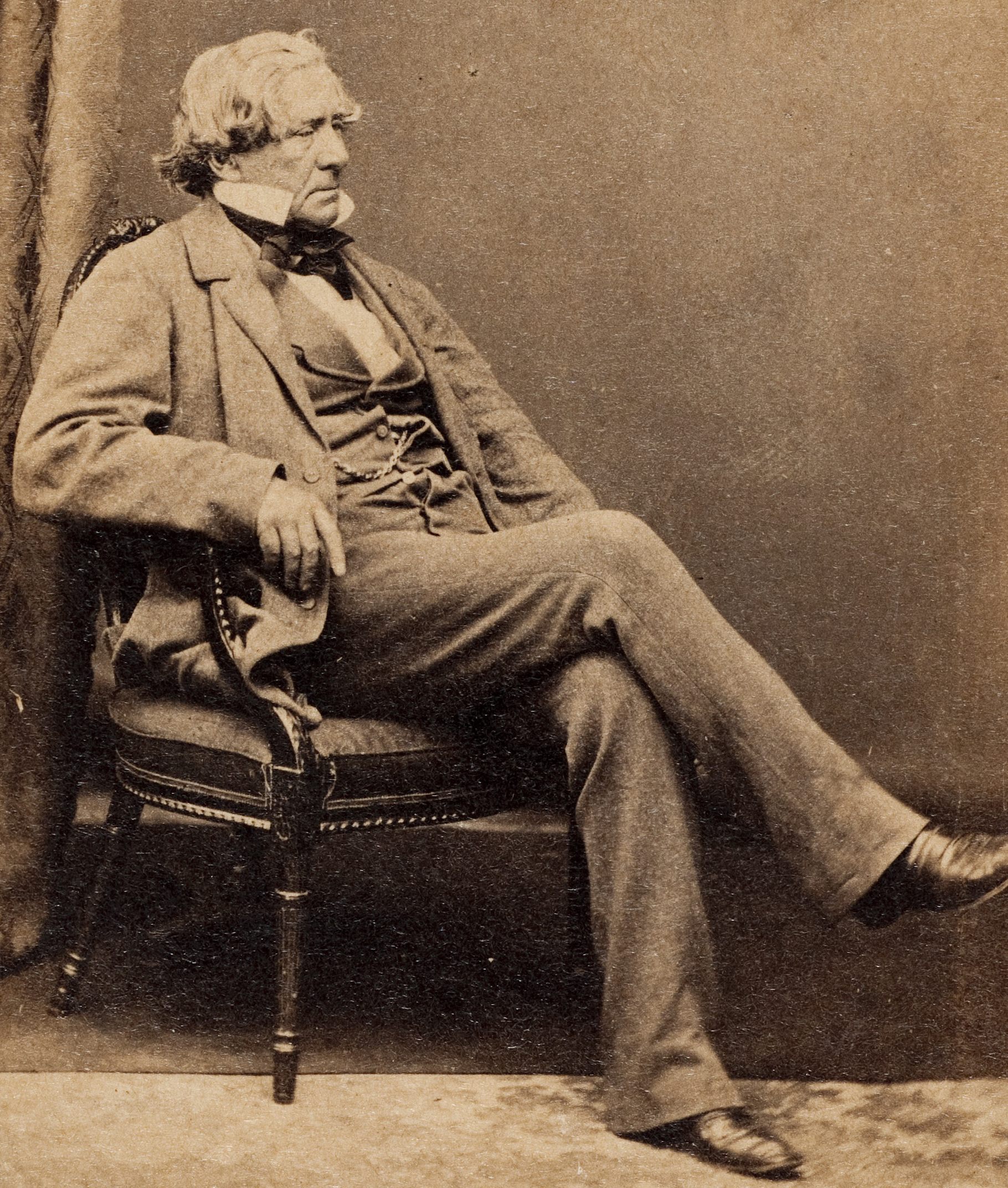
William Charles Wentworth was the leading advocate for responsible government in the Australian colonies and was central in the establishment of the Parliament of New South Wales.

The early colonists, coming mostly from the United Kingdom (which by 1801 included Ireland), were familiar with the Westminster system and made efforts to reform local government in order to increase the opportunity for ordinary men to participate. The Governors and London therefore set in motion a gradual process of establishing a Westminster system in the colonies. They did not want to get ahead of population or economic growth, nor be so slow as to provoke clamouring for revolutionary change as had happened in the American Revolutionary War and was threatened in the Rebellions of 1837–1838 in Canada. The government first established appointed or partially elected Legislative Councils. William Wentworth among other prominent colonists in this time advocated for the introduction of responsible government in the Australian colonies.

Violence erupted in the Colony of Victoria during the 1850s, where there was growing political discontent and civil disobedience among the common men, especially in the inland gold fields areas. This culminated in the 1854 Eureka Rebellion near Ballarat. Miners formed the Ballarat Reform League and demanded an end to taxation (via an expensive miner's license) without representation, the right to vote in colonial elections, and colonial maintenance and upkeep of the area's roads. While the demands themselves were largely inspired by the British Chartists, and made no mention of responsible government, they were preceded by a preamble indicating the League's "object" was to replace "paid Officials" who made the law to suit "their selfish ends and narrow views," and to instead place power in the hands of "responsible representatives of the people." 190 miners armed themselves, erected a stockade, and raised the Southern Cross Flag.

The British colonial forces overran the stockade, capturing or killing dozens of miners and bringing many to Melbourne for trial. However, mass public support led to the miners' release. Within a year, most of their demands had been met, including responsible self-government and universal male suffrage for the Colony of Victoria.

The Eureka Rebellion and events in Victoria resonated around the Australian colonies, which had their own regional agitators for change. South Australia was quick to pass universal male suffrage, and Victoria and New South Wales followed soon after. By the end of the 1850s, all the Australian colonies and New Zealand had achieved responsible self-government. Only Western Australia took until 1890 to achieve this. Politics in Western Australia were instead dominated by a compact, the "Six Families."

The Northern Territory was originally part of South Australia, but transferred to the Australian Commonwealth Government in 1911. It then lost responsible self-government (although residents could still vote in federal elections) and did not gain it back until 1974. Likewise, the Australian Capital Territory was originally part of New South Wales. It was transferred to the Commonwealth Government in 1911 and lost responsible self-government until 1989.

==== Participation by women and indigenous people ====
White female suffrage was gained from the 1890s to the 1910s in Australia and New Zealand (1893), allowing the other half of the ethnic European population to participate in responsible representative government.

In New Zealand, the indigenous Maori became British subjects following the 1840 Treaty of Waitangi.

In Australia during the colonial period, some Aboriginal and Torres Strait Islander people may have theoretically had the right to vote in colonial elections. But, in practice they were usually unable to exercise this right: they lived traditional lifestyles in remote areas uncontacted by the colony, or affected by the disruption of the Frontier Wars. In addition, they often were excluded from voting by racial discrimination in practices or by property requirements.

After federation, the Commonwealth Franchise Act 1902 barred Aboriginal and Torres Strait Islander people from voting in federal elections unless they were already eligible to vote in their state. Queensland explicitly barred Aboriginal and Torres Strait Islander people from voting until the 1960s, while Western Australia barred Aboriginal people unless they successfully applied to become citizens. As a result, most Aboriginal people across the country were prevented from voting, including those who in theory had the right. Later, the 1962 Commonwealth Electoral Act gave all Aboriginal people the option to enroll to vote, but still most were not able to exercise their rights.

After passage of the 1967 Australian referendum, the federal government was allowed to count Indigenous Australians in the census, and to ensure that their voting rights were respected across the country.

=== Cape Colony ===
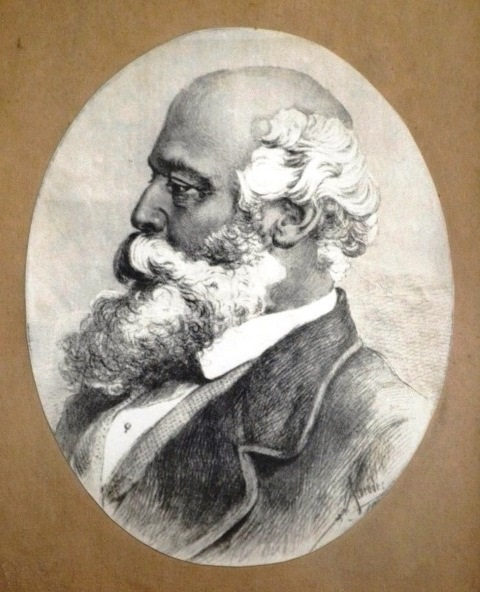
John Molteno, Father of Responsible Government and first Prime Minister of the Cape

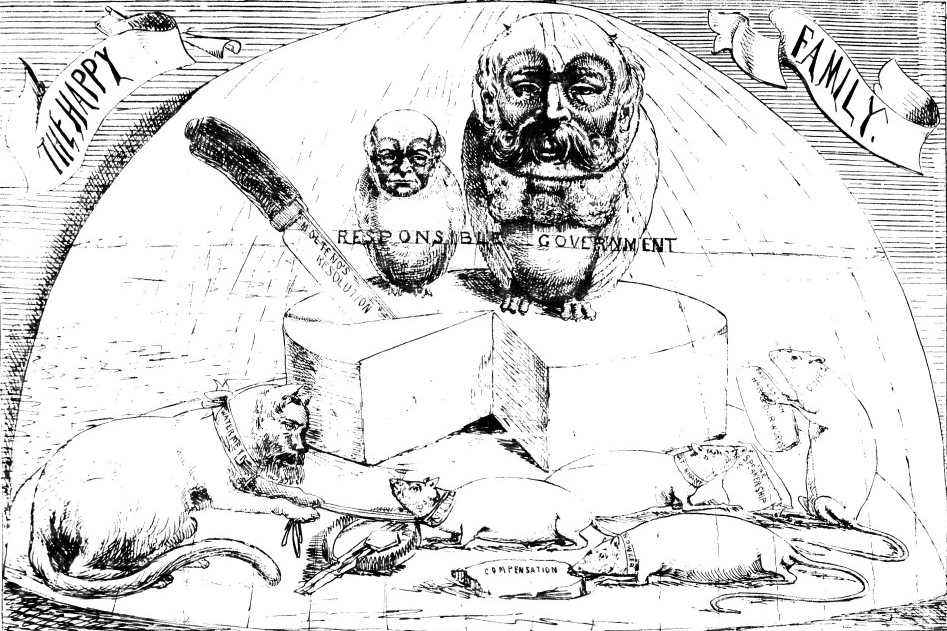
Cartoon critical of responsible government, showing power and positions divided between various factions by Cape leaders, depicted as owls, Molteno (to the right) and Saul Solomon

The Cape Colony, in Southern Africa, was under responsible self-government from 1872 until 1910 when it became the Cape Province of the new Union of South Africa.

Under its previous system of representative government, the Ministers of the Cape Government reported directly to the British Imperial Governor, and not to the locally elected representatives in the Cape Parliament. Among Cape citizens of all races, growing anger at their powerlessness in influencing unpopular imperial decisions had repeatedly led to protests and rowdy political meetings – especially during the early "Convict Crisis" of 1849 to 1850.

A popular political movement for responsible government soon emerged, under local leader John Molteno. A protracted struggle was then conducted over the ensuing years as the movement (known informally as "the responsibles") grew increasingly powerful, and used their parliamentary majority to put pressure on the British Governor, withholding public finances from him, and conducting public agitations. Not everyone favoured responsible government though, and pro-imperial press outlets even accused the movement of constituting "crafts and assaults of the devil".

Supporters believed that the most effective means of instituting responsible government was simply to change the section of the constitution which prevented government officials from being elected to parliament or members of parliament from serving in executive positions. The conflict therefore centred on the changing of this specific section. "Although responsible government merely required an amendment to s.79 of the constitution, it transpired only after nearly twenty years in 1872 when the so-called 'responsibles' under Molteno were able to command sufficient support in both houses to secure the passage of the necessary bill." Finally, with a parliamentary majority and with the Colonial Office and new Governor Henry Barkly won over, Molteno instituted responsible government, making the Ministers directly responsible to the Cape Parliament, and becoming the Cape's first Prime Minister.

The ensuing period saw an economic recovery, a massive growth in exports and an expansion of the colony's frontiers. Despite political complications that arose from time to time (such as an ill-fated scheme by the British Colonial Office to enforce a confederation in Southern Africa in 1878, and tensions with the Afrikaner-dominated Government of Transvaal over trade and railroad construction), economic and social progress in the Cape Colony continued at a steady pace until a renewed attempt to extend British control over the hinterland caused the outbreak of the Anglo-Boer Wars in 1899.

An important feature of the Cape Colony under responsible government was that it was the only state in southern Africa (and one of very few in the world at the time) to have a non-racial system of voting. Later however – following the South Africa Act 1909 to form the Union of South Africa – this multi-racial universal suffrage was steadily eroded, and eventually abolished by the Apartheid government in 1948.

=== Former British colonies with responsible government ===
The following is a list of British colonies, and the year when responsible government was established in the territory:

- 1848 – Province of Nova Scotia
- 1848 – Province of Canada
- 1851 – Prince Edward Island
- 1854 – Province of New Brunswick
- 1855 – Colony of Newfoundland (suspended from 1934 to 1949), (Note: In 1934, the General Assembly of Newfoundland followed through with recommendations made in a royal commission, suspending responsible government in Newfoundland. From 1934 to 1949, Newfoundland was governed by the Newfoundland Commission of Government, a body that was subordinate to the British government. Responsible government in Newfoundland was restored in 1949, after it joined the Canadian Confederation.) the Colony of New South Wales, and the Colony of Victoria
- 1856 – Colony of New Zealand and the Colony of Tasmania
- 1857 – Province of South Australia
- 1859 – Colony of Queensland (separated from New South Wales in that year with self-government from the beginning)
- 1872 – Cape Colony
- 1890 – Colony of Western Australia
- 1893 – Colony of Natal
- 1906 – Transvaal Colony
- 1907 – Orange River Colony
- 1921 – Colony of Malta (suspended from 1936 to 1947, and from 1959 to 1962)
- 1922 – Irish Free State
- 1923 – Southern Rhodesia

Responsible government was implemented in British India at the provincial level under the Government of India Act 1935, but it was not implemented at the level of the central government before India and Pakistan became independent. After the Balfour Declaration in 1926 and the passage of the Statute of Westminster in 1931, Dominions with responsible self-government at the national or federal level could become independent. Thus, India and Pakistan effectively ceased to be British colonies in 1947 when responsible government was fully implemented in them. The same is true of a variety of other former British colonies that attained responsible government and independence in the decolonisation of the British Empire in the years following World War II.

== In Belgian history ==
Belgium was another early adopter of responsible government, implementing it after the Belgian Revolution of 1830-1831. Under Belgium's first constitution, ministers were legally responsible for government policy and accountable to the parliament. This technically took the form of individual ministerial responsibility, not the full collective cabinet responsibility characteristic of responsible government. In practice, though, Belgian governments have customarily behaved as though collectively responsible, and the current constitution makes this collective responsibility explicit. However, early in Belgian history, democratic responsibility was limited by a narrow franchise. Only 1% of the population was eligible to vote in the 1831 elections, and the franchise remained around 1-2% until it was extended to all adult males over age 25 before the 1894 election and to women before the 1949 election.

== In German history ==
In the early 1860s, the Prussian Prime Minister Otto von Bismarck was involved in a bitter dispute with the Liberals, who sought to institute a system of responsible government modeled on that of Britain. Bismarck, who strongly opposed that demand, managed to deflect the pressure by embarking energetically and successfully on the unification of Germany. The Liberals, who were also strong German nationalists, backed Bismarck's unification efforts and tacitly accepted that the Constitution of Imperial Germany, crafted by Bismarck, did not include a responsible government – the Chancellor being accountable solely to the emperor and needing no parliamentary confidence. Germany gained a responsible government only with the German constitutional reforms of October 1918; this was affirmed under the new republican constitution of the Weimar Republic and made more secure by the basic law of the Federal Republic of Germany. Historians account the lack of responsible government in the formative decades of united Germany as one of the factors contributing to the prolonged weakness of German democratic institutions, lasting also after such a government was finally instituted.

== See also ==
- Fusion of powers
- History of the constitution of the United Kingdom § Worldwide influence
- Parliamentary sovereignty
- Rule of law
- Separation of powers
