= Robert Baldwin =

Co-Premier of Province of Canada (1842–1843; 1848–1851)

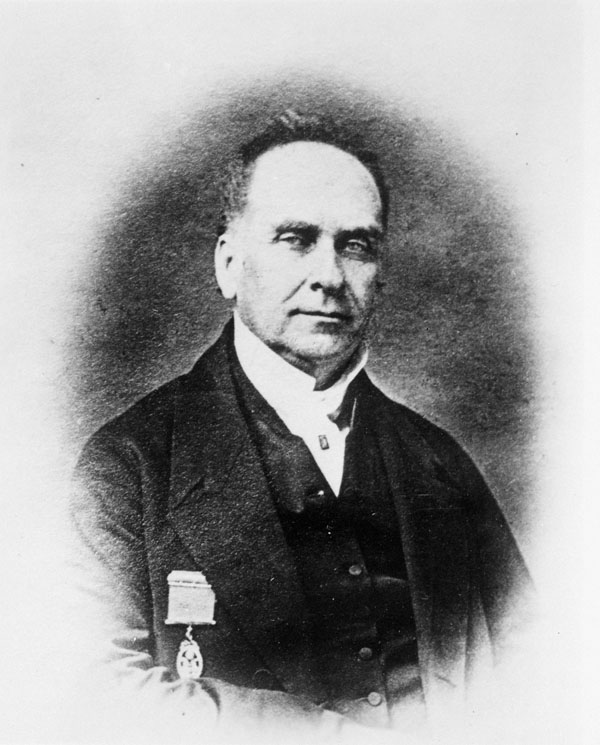

Joint Premier of Province of Canada, for Canada West
- In office 1842–1843
- Preceded by: William Henry Draper
- In office March 11, 1848 – June 21, 1851
- Succeeded by: Francis Hincks

Attorney General for Canada West
- In office September 17, 1842 – December 11, 1843
- Preceded by: William Henry Draper
- Succeeded by: William Henry Draper
- In office March 11, 1848 – June 21, 1851
- Preceded by: Henry Sherwood
- Succeeded by: William Buell Richards

Member of the Parliament of the Province of Canada for Hastings, Canada West
- In office 1841–1842
- Preceded by: New position
- Succeeded by: Edmund Murney

Member of the Parliament of the Province of Canada for Rimouski, Canada East
- In office 1843–1844
- Preceded by: Michel Borne
- Succeeded by: Louis Bertrand

Personal details
- Born: May 12, 1804 York, Upper Canada
- Died: December 9, 1858 (aged 54) Toronto, Canada West
- Resting place: Spadina House (Baldwin family cemetery)
- Party: Reform movement
- Spouse(s): Augusta Elizabeth Sullivan (May 3, 1827; her death, January 11, 1836)
- Relatives: William Warren Baldwin (father); Frederick Walker Baldwin (grandson); Robert Baldwin Ross (grandson)
- Profession: Lawyer

Robert Baldwin (May 12, 1804 – December 9, 1858) was an Upper Canadian lawyer and politician who with his political partner Louis-Hippolyte Lafontaine of Lower Canada, led the first responsible government ministry in the Province of Canada. "Responsible Government" marked the province's democratic self-government, without a revolution, although not without violence. This achievement also included the introduction of municipal government, the introduction of a modern legal system, reforms to the jury system in Upper Canada, and the abolition of imprisonment for debt. Baldwin is also noted for feuding with the Orange Order and other fraternal societies. The Lafontaine-Baldwin government enacted the Rebellion Losses Bill to compensate Lower Canadians for damages suffered during the Lower Canada Rebellion of 1837–1838. The passage of the Bill outraged Anglo-Canadian Tories in Montreal, resulting in the burning of the Parliament Buildings in Montreal in 1849.

== Family ==
Robert Baldwin's grandfather, also Robert Baldwin ("Robert the Emigrant") moved to Upper Canada from Ireland in 1799. His father was William Warren Baldwin (April 25, 1775 – January 8, 1844).

The Baldwin family was a prominent one. Robert Baldwin counted among his cousins such influential Upper Canadians as the Anglican bishop Maurice Scollard Baldwin, Toronto mayor Robert Baldwin Sullivan and the Irish-Catholic leader Connell James Baldwin. The Russell-Willcocks-Baldwin family formed an elite "compact" much like the infamous "Family Compact" led by Sir John Robinson against whom they fought.

In 1827, Baldwin, married his cousin Augusta Elizabeth Sullivan, daughter of Daniel Sullivan. The couple had four children, two sons and two daughters. The marriage ended with Augusta Elizabeth's death in 1836. Robert Baldwin died twenty-two years later, in 1858.

Robert Baldwin was the grandfather of Frederick Walker Baldwin, a Canadian aviation pioneer and partner of the famous inventor Alexander Graham Bell. Robert Baldwin was also the grandfather of Robert Baldwin Ross, a French-born journalist, art critic, and literary executor of Oscar Wilde.

== Political principles ==
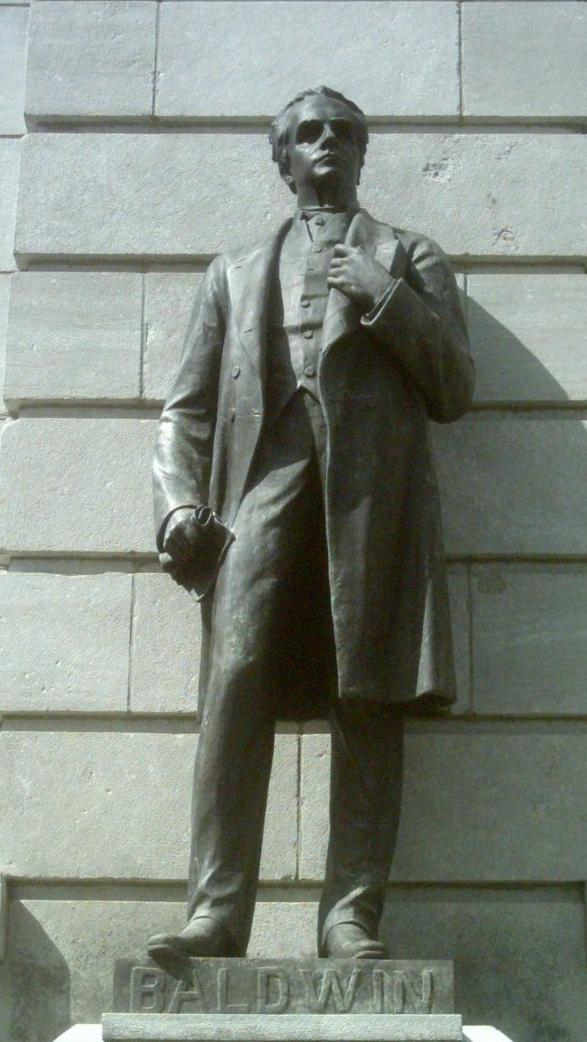
Alfred Laliberté's Robert Baldwin sculpture in front of Parliament Building (Quebec)

=== First Principles ===
Baldwin's political principles must be viewed in the context of the eighteenth-century British “Country Party,” a loose coalition of Parliamentarians whose influence was also felt in the American Revolution and subsequent Jacksonian politics. The Country party embodied a civic humanism that drew on ancient Greek and Roman conceptions of citizenship, and the value of selfless political participation for the public good; those selfish few who placed their private interests before the public good threatened the moral commitment of all citizens to political participation. The civic humanism of the Country party rejected the commercial ideology of the royal "Court” party. The Country party had a republican emphasis that sought to preserve the power of a democratic parliament from the encroachments of the crown during the vast expansion of state administration, public credit, and the financial and commercial revolutions in the late eighteenth century and early nineteenth centuries. It was similar to American conceptions of “civic republicanism” as they developed after the revolution among Jacksonian Democrats, as well as in the Chartist movement in Britain in the late 1830s.

=== Responsible Government ===
The concept of "responsible government" has been attributed to Dr. William W. Baldwin and his son, Robert. Although the idea of colonial ministerial responsibility to a colonial parliament had been touted since the late 18th century, the Baldwins were among the first to successfully implement the principle. The meaning of the phrase evolved. In an 1828 Upper Canadian petition to the British Parliament on colonial ills, it was an assertion that the Constitutional Act was a treaty between the British Parliament and the colonial peoples, and could not be arbitrarily altered by one or the other party. In 1836, when Baldwin convinced the members of the Executive Council to resign over Lt. Governor Bond-Head's refusal to consult them on administrative appointments, it did not mean ministerial accountability to the elected Assembly (Executive Councillors were not ministers) but the Crown's obligation to consult that Council. The slipperiness of the phrase points to its real goal, 'sovereignty by stealth,' without rebellion. It was not until after the Rebellions of 1837, and the implementation of Lord Durham's Report, that the Executive Council became a cabinet of ministers that were heads of departments, and the phrase "responsible government" came to mean their responsibility to the elected Assembly, not the appointed Governor.

=== Municipal government ===
Municipal government in Upper Canada was under the control of appointed magistrates who sat in Courts of Quarter Sessions to administer the law within a District. A few cities, such as Toronto, were incorporated by special acts of the legislature. After the Union of the Canadas, the new governor, Charles Poulett Thomson, 1st Baron Sydenham, spearheaded the passage of the District Councils Act which transferred the municipal government to District Councils. His bill allowed for two elected councilors from each township, but the warden, clerk, and treasurer were to be appointed by the government. This thus allowed for strong administrative control and continued government patronage appointments. Sydenham's bill reflected his larger concerns to limit popular participation under the tutelage of a strong executive. Baldwin was one of the few Reformers who opposed the District Council Act; he considered its reform by the Baldwin Act in 1849 one of his greatest accomplishments. The Baldwin Act made the municipal government truly democratic rather than an extension of central control of the Crown. It delegated authority to the municipal governments so they could raise taxes and enact by-laws. It also established a hierarchy of types of municipal governments, starting at the top with cities and continued down past towns, villages and finally townships. This system was to prevail for the next 150 years.

== Political career ==
Robert Baldwin was not a natural politician. He was described as melancholy, and awkward in public. He gave speeches in a whispering, halting style. Although elected in 1830 as a member of the Legislative Assembly for the town of York in a by-election, he was defeated in the general election later that year. Despite this inauspicious start, his adherence to principle and his fearlessness in the face of Orange Order electoral violence won him the loyalty of voters in the post-Rebellion period.

=== To the Rebellion of 1837 ===
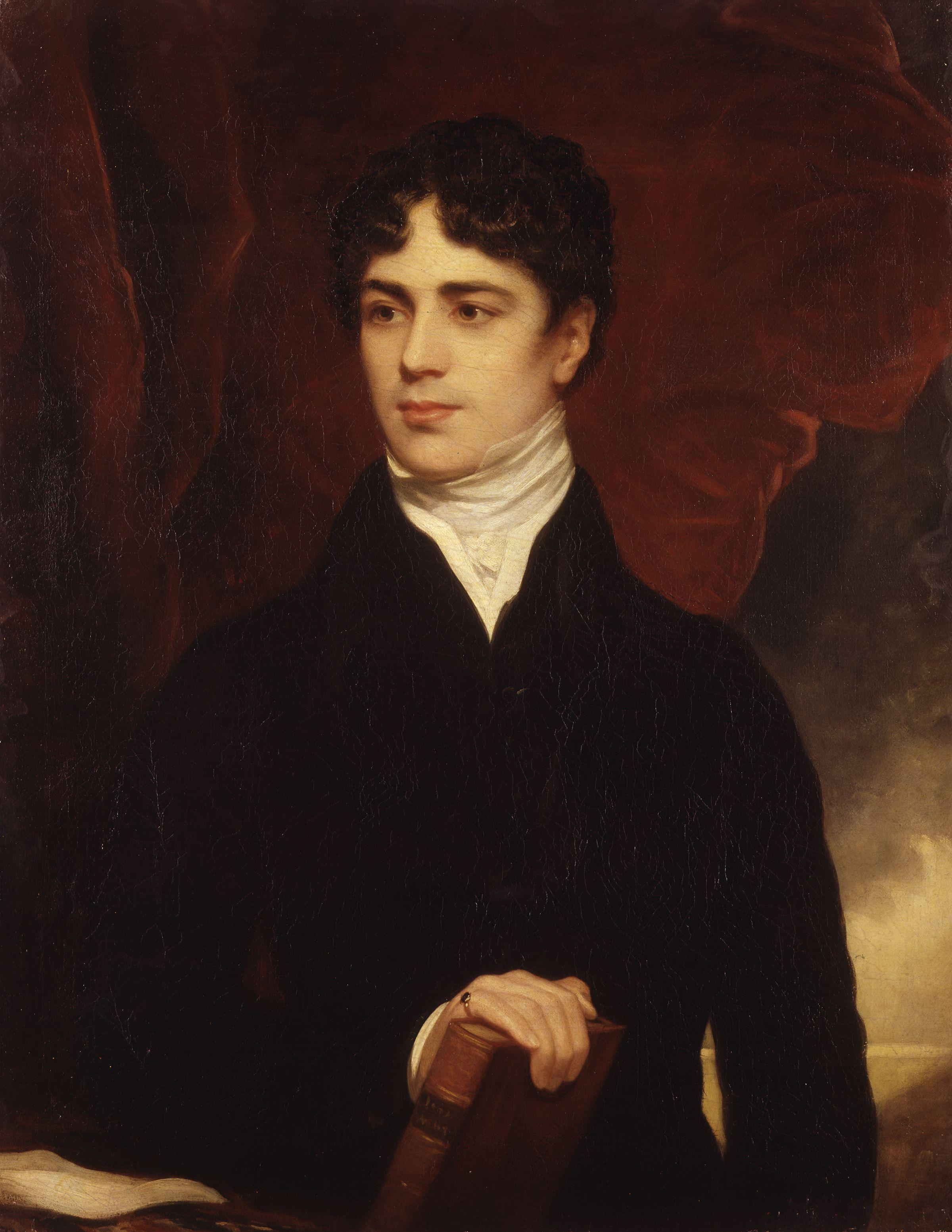
John George Lambton, 1st Earl of Durham.

After losing his seat in the 1830 election, Baldwin withdrew to his private legal practice until his wife's death as a result of a Caesarian in 1836. He took no part in the Political Union movement of the 1830s. Two weeks after Eliza Baldwin's death, Sir Francis Bond Head (1793–1875) arrived as the new Lieutenant Governor, to address reform grievances. He sought out and appointed reformers Baldwin, John Dunn and John Rolph to the Executive Council with three Compact members. Baldwin's condition for joining the Executive Council was a verbal commitment by Bond Head to a responsible government. Bond Head later refused to give written confirmation of the agreement, so Baldwin resigned within a month and convinced the other councilors, both Reform and Tory, to resign with him. This convinced Bond Head that the Reformers were intractable. He called an immediate election, in which he as Lt. Governor waded into the electoral fray, and with the use of Orange Order polling violence, expunged the reformers from the Legislative Assembly.

Baldwin traveled to Great Britain in 1836 to see the colonial secretary, Lord Glenelg but was refused. He wrote to Glenelg that "if the Mother Country desires to retain the colony ... it can only be done either by force or with the consent of the people. I take it for granted that Great Britain cannot desire to exercise a Government of the Sword." He laid out the remedy – responsible government – but was spurned, and the colony descended into rebellion.

Though a moderate reformer, Robert Baldwin strongly disapproved of the rebellion of 1837–38, and as a function of his views provided allegedly a lackluster defense of Peter Matthews (rebel), who was executed for his role in the Rebellion. Baldwin served as an intermediary, with John Rolph, between the rebels and the Lt. Governor, carrying a flag of truce to the rebel camp north of Toronto on 5 December 1837, but failed to head off an armed clash. He and his father William advised Lord Durham to suggest responsible government to the British government.

=== The Union of the Canadas ===
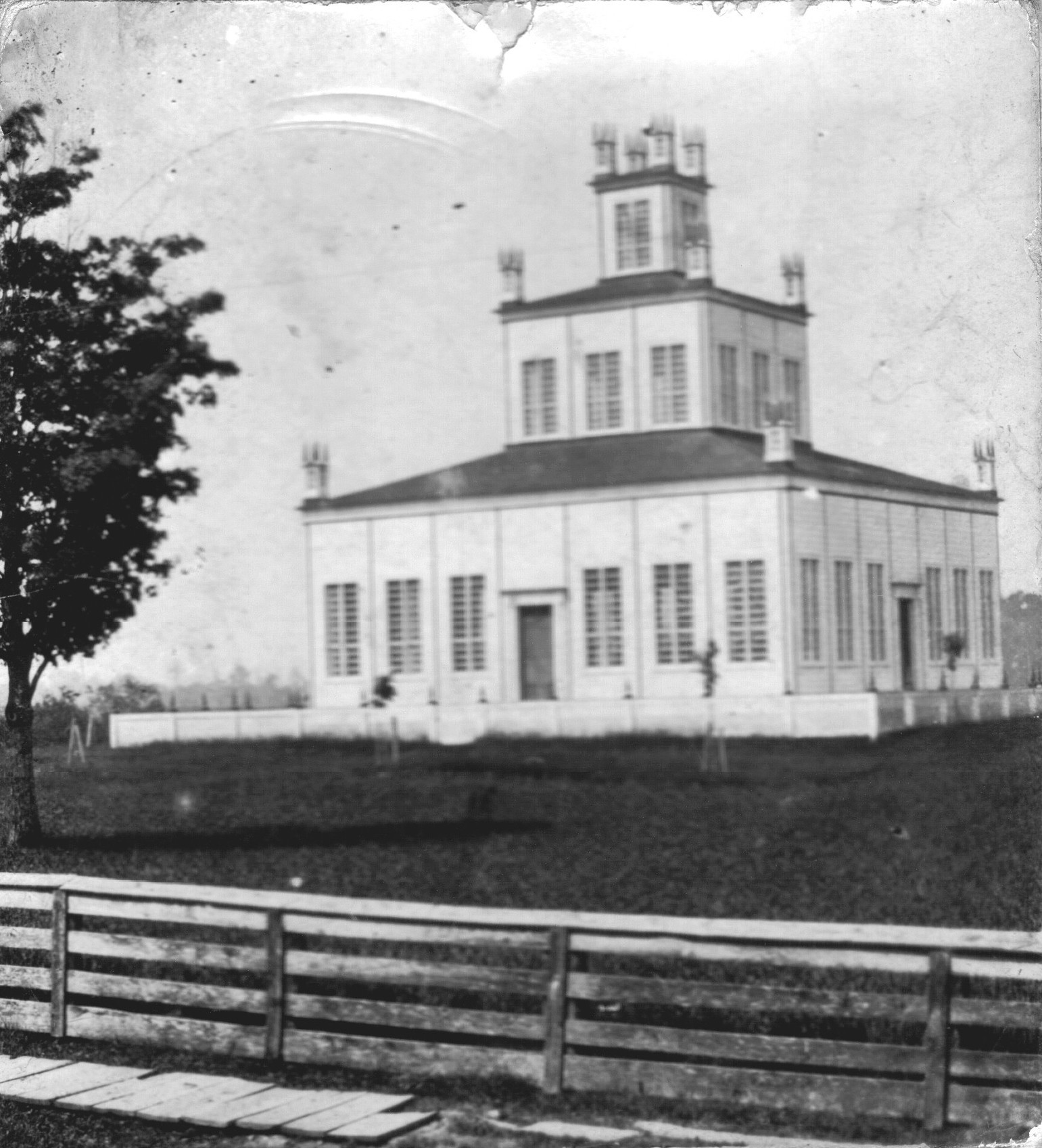
The Temple of the Children of Peace, Sharon

In response to Durham's Report, the British Government appointed Charles Poulett Thomson (later Lord Sydenham) as Governor with two main tasks. Firstly, he was to weaken the Canadien vote in Lower Canada through the union of the provinces of Upper and Lower Canada and a strengthened Executive Council. And secondly, he was to strengthen British rule by imposing a new system of centrally controlled District Councils that would take much of the elected Assembly's legislative purview, leaving it little to do but approve the Governor's budgets. Both reforms would strengthen the central state and weaken (Canadien) legislative power.

Sydenham reformed the Executive Council, making government ministers members for the first time (i.e. Cabinet Rule). He attempted to solicit Reform support by appointing Baldwin as Solicitor General in 1840. To follow his principle of responsible government, Baldwin needed to seek election so that he, a government minister, could be accountable to the elected Assembly, not the Crown.

Orange Order riots during the Toronto civic elections in January 1841 convinced Baldwin he could never win a seat in the city. Instead, he sought election in the ridings of Hastings and 4th York. The Children of Peace, who had played a large role in the pre-Rebellion Reform Movement, managed Baldwin's election in 4th York and he 'walked over the course without a contest,' thus becoming the first member to be elected to the United Parliament (1st Parliament of the Province of Canada). He was also elected in the district of Hastings.

=== Baldwin & LaFontaine ===
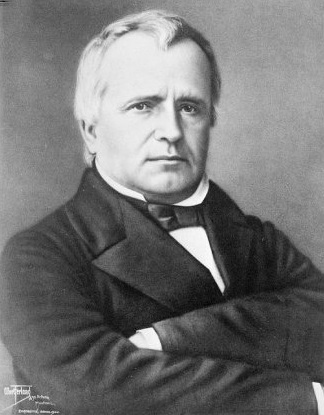
Louis-Hypolite LaFontaine, Father of Responsible Government

Although Baldwin was elected in two seats in Canada West, reformers were in the minority. In Canada East, gerrymandering and Orange Order violence were used to prevent the election of Louis-Hippolyte LaFontaine, leader of the Canadien reformers in Terrebonne, outside Montreal. To ensure LaFontaine a seat, Baldwin proposed to David Willson, leader of the Children of Peace, that they nominate LaFontaine for the seat in 4th York. Baldwin also insisted that Sydenham include LaFontaine in the reformed Executive Council, or he would resign as Solicitor General. Their alliance allowed Lafontaine to have a seat in the assembly in 1841 and for Baldwin to win the by-election in 1843.

On 3 September 1841, the Children of Peace held a campaign rally for Baldwin and LaFontaine in their Temple, where they rejoiced "to say that we have it in our power to show our impartial respect to the Canadian people of the Lower Province." Despite threats of Orange Order violence, LaFontaine was elected as representative of 4th York.

However, before LaFontaine could take up his seat, Governor Sydenham died. His replacement, Sir Charles Bagot, was not able to form a mixed cabinet of Reformers and Tories, and so he was forced to include the "Canadien party" under LaFontaine. LaFontaine refused to join the Executive Council unless Baldwin was also included. Bagot was finally forced to accede in September 1842, and when he became severely ill thereafter, Baldwin and Lafontaine became the first real premiers of the Province of Canada. However, to take office as ministers, the two had to run for re-election. While LaFontaine was easily re-elected in 4th York, Baldwin lost his seat in Hastings as a result of Orange Order violence. It was now that the pact between the two men was completely solidified, as LaFontaine arranged a by-election to be held in Rimouski, a constituency in a heavily francophone area of Canada East, and for Baldwin to run there. Baldwin won the 1843 by-election. This was expression of the reciprocal relationship between the two Canadas they sought. LaFontaine overcame linguistic prejudice to win a seat in English Canada, and Baldwin obtained a seat in French Canada.

=== Metcalfe and the Reform Association of Canada ===
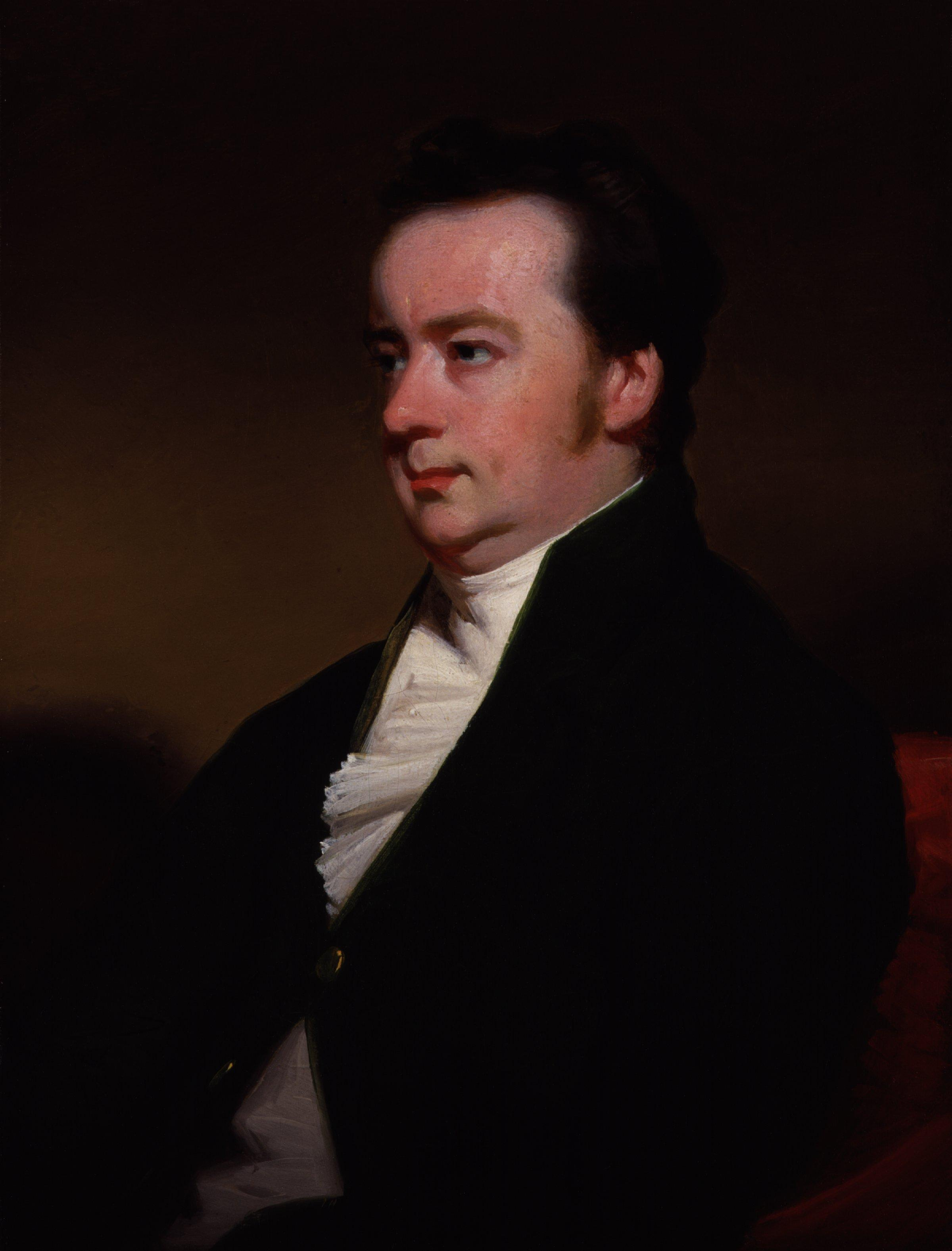
Lord Charles Metcalfe

The Baldwin-LaFontaine ministry barely lasted six months before Governor Bagot also died in March 1843. He was replaced with Sir Charles Metcalfe, whose instructions were to check the "radical" reform government. The relationship between Baldwin and Metcalfe soured over Baldwin's Secret Societies Bill, which sought to outlaw the Orange Order and its political violence. Metcalfe rejected the legislation and then began appointing his supporters to patronage positions without Baldwin and LaFontaine's approval. They resigned in November 1843, beginning a constitutional crisis that lasted for a year. This year-long crisis, in which the legislature was prorogued, “was the final signpost on Upper Canada's conceptual road to democracy. Lacking the scale of the American Revolution, it nonetheless forced a comparable articulation and rethinking of the basics of political dialogue in the province.”

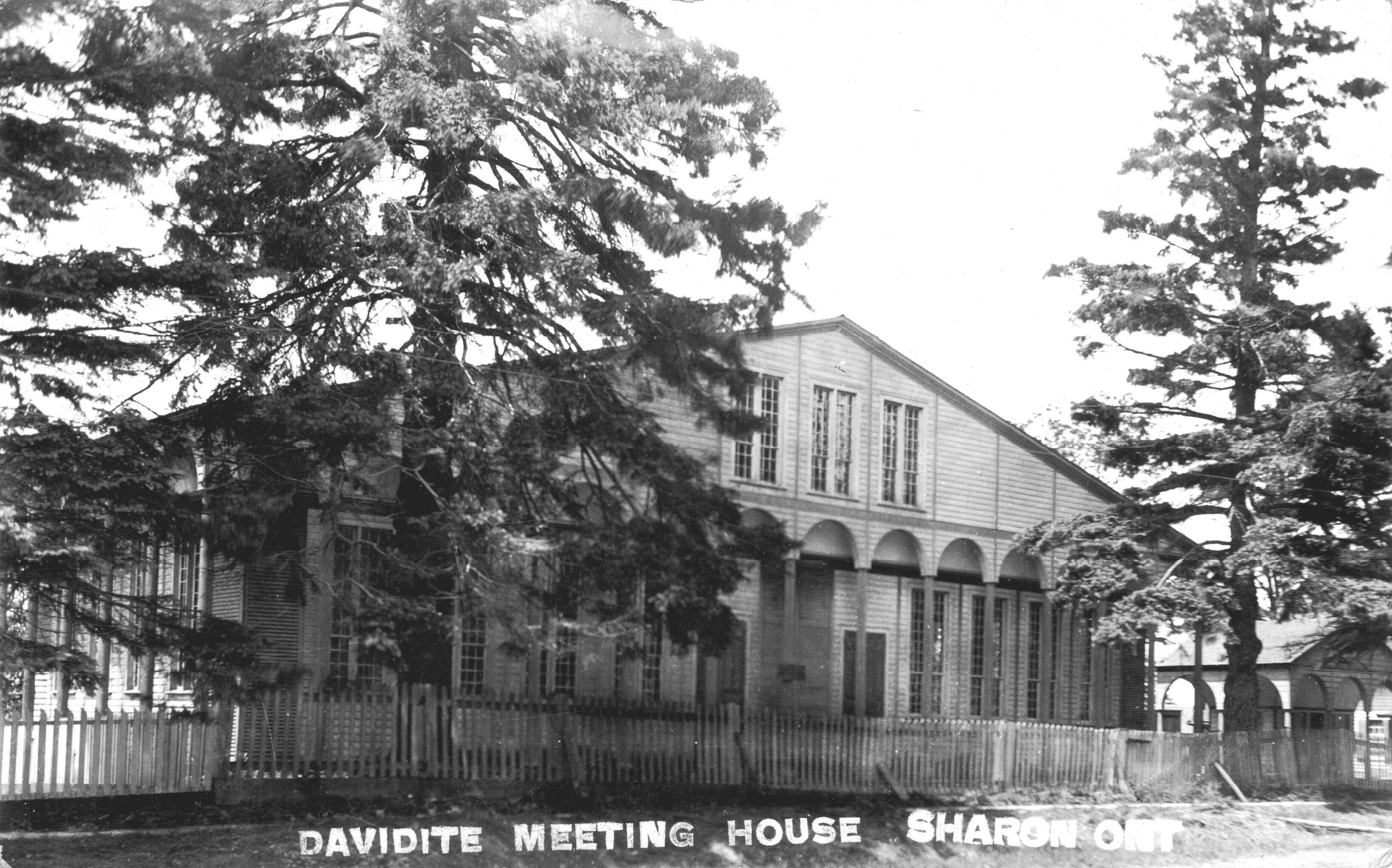
The Second Meeting House, Sharon, where the Reform Association met June, 1844.

During the year-long crisis, Metcalfe was to champion the Sydenham system and its conceptions of a limited, liberal capitalist government accountable to the imperial state, not the local Assembly; he continued to govern, demonstrating the irrelevance of Parliament. Baldwin now established a “Reform Association” in February 1844, to unite the Reform movement in Canada West to explain their understanding of responsible government before the expected election. Twenty-two branches were established. A grand meeting of all branches of the Reform Association was held in the Second Meeting House of the Children of Peace in Sharon. It was ultimately to serve as the springboard for Baldwin's successful candidacy in 4th York. Baldwin had been at a loss about where to run after his loss in Hastings. Orange mobs continued to rule out any chance in Hastings, or in 2nd York, where he had lost to Orange leader George Duggan. LaFontaine, in yet another act of friendship, gave up his seat representing 4th York, thus allowing the desperate Baldwin to run there. David Willson, having arranged for the Reform Association rally during the illumination ceremony, now became Baldwin's campaign manager. It was reported that over three thousand people attended this June rally for Baldwin.

=== Responsible Government achieved ===
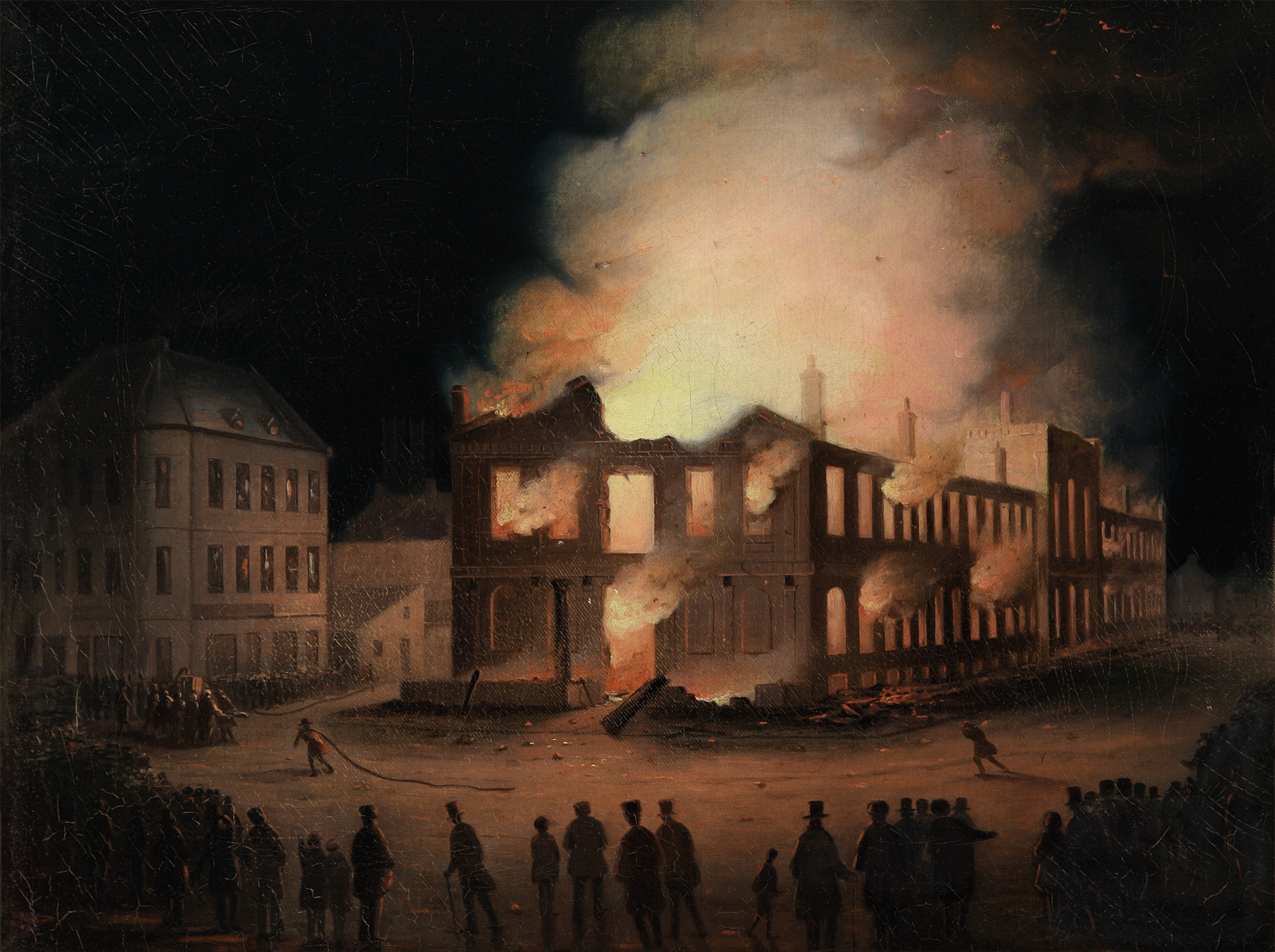
Joseph Légaré, The Burning of the Parliament Building in Montreal, 1849

At the general election which followed, the Governor-General was sustained by a narrow majority. The year-long political crisis had, however, made it clear that responsible government was inevitable; even the old Compact Tories, now reshaped into an incipient conservative party, demanded some form of responsible government. Metcalfe continued to govern until struck down by illness in 1846. The new Governor-General, Lord Elgin, was sent out specifically to acknowledge responsible government in the Canadas. In 1848 the Reformers were again returned to power, and Baldwin and Lafontaine formed their second administration on March 11 and carried numerous important reforms, including the Amnesty Act which offered pardons to all those involved in the Rebellions of 1837–8, the creation of a secular University of Toronto, and the introduction of municipal government. Their bravest achievement was to shepherd the Rebellion Losses Bill through Parliament in 1849. It sparked Red riots, and the burning of the Parliament buildings as much of Europe was similarly engulfed in a wave of republican revolutions and counter-revolutions.

=== Reform transformed ===
The Baldwinite reformers were not a political party. With their primary aim achieved, the centre could no longer hold. Internal dissensions soon began to appear, and in 1851 Baldwin resigned. The special struggle leading to his resignation was an attempt to abolish the Court of Chancery of Upper Canada, whose constitution was due to a measure introduced by Baldwin in 1849. The attempt, though defeated, had been supported by a majority of the representatives from Upper Canada, and Baldwin's fastidious conscience took it as a vote of confidence. A deeper reason was his inability to approve of the advanced views of the Radicals, or "Clear Grits," as they came to be called. On seeking re-election in York, he chose not to give any pledge on the burning question of the Clergy Reserves and was defeated. In 1853 the Liberal-Conservative party, formed in 1854 by a coalition, attempted to bring him out as a candidate for the upper house, which was at this date elective. Though he had broken with the advanced reformers, Baldwin could not approve of the tactics of their opponents and refused to stand.

He died on 9 December 1858 in Spadina aged 54. Even those who most strongly opposed his measures admitted the purity and unselfishness of his motives. After the concession of responsible government, he devoted himself to bringing about a good understanding between the English and French-speaking inhabitants of Canada, and his memory is held as dear among the French Canadians as in his native province of Ontario.

== Legacy ==
External videos
- "Baldwin & LaFontaine" – Historica Canada. - Heritage Minutes (1:01 min)

John Ralston Saul pointed out in the inaugural LaFontaine-Baldwin Symposium, that “we have killed in political strife among ourselves less than a hundred citizens – most of them on a single day at Batoche,” Saskatchewan, during the Riel Rebellion. “The first measure of any citizen-based culture” he adds, “must not be its rhetoric or myths or leaders or laws but how few of its citizens it kills.” This non-violent tradition we owe to Robert Baldwin and Louis-Hippolyte LaFontaine, who refused to abandon principle, and who walked away from retribution.

Baldwin Steps, a series of stairs from his father's Spadina House at Austin Terrace to Davenport Road, is named after Baldwin.

Political offices
Preceded by Henry Sherwood	Joint Premiers of the Province of Canada - Canada West; 1848–1851	Succeeded by Sir Francis Hincks
Party political offices
Preceded by none	Leader of the Reform Party of Upper Canada; 1839?-1857	Succeeded by George Brown as de facto leader of the Liberal Party of Canada
