= Michel Borne =

Lower Canada businessman and politician

Member of the Legislative Assembly of the Province of Canada for Rimouski
- In office 1841–1842
- Preceded by: New position
- Succeeded by: Robert Baldwin

Councillor, Montreal municipal council
- In office 1840–1842

Personal details
- Born: September 19, 1784 Quebec City, Old Province of Quebec
- Died: October 19, 1853 Chambly, Quebec
- Party: Anti-unionist; French-Canadian Group
- Spouse(s): Angélique Paquette, Charlotte Munro
- Children: 12; 6 died young
- Occupation: Merchant

Michel Borne (September 19, 1784 – October 19, 1853) was a merchant and political figure in Canada East (now Quebec). He represented Rimouski in the Legislative Assembly of the Province of Canada from 1841 to 1842. Borne resigned his seat to allow Robert Baldwin, the Reform leader from Canada West (now Ontario) to gain a seat in the Assembly. That manoeuvre was key to building the alliance between Baldwin and Louis-Hippolyte LaFontaine, which ultimately led to the establishment of responsible government in the Province of Canada.

== Biography ==
Borne was born in Quebec City, the son of George Borne, a native of Grenoble, France, and Marie-Françoise Letellier. In 1808, Borne married Angélique Paquette. The couple had twelve children, six of whom died young. He was a merchant in Quebec City. In 1843, he was appointed the superintendent and collector of the Chambly Canal.

On February 22, 1830, Borne married Charlotte Munro, also widowed, at Notre-Dame-de-Montréal. They had together five children.

Michel Borne died in Chambly on October 19, 1853 after a short disease.

== Politics ==
=== Lower Canada ===
In 1828, Borne was an unsuccessful candidate for the Quebec Upper Town seat in the Lower Canada Legislative Assembly, losing to Thomas Lee. Borne was one of the first members of the new municipal council for Quebec City from 1840 to 1842.

=== Province of Canada ===
Following the Lower Canada Rebellion in 1837, and the similar rebellion in Upper Canada (now Ontario) the same year, the British government decided to merge the two provinces into a single province, as recommended by Lord Durham in the Durham Report. The Union Act, 1840, passed by the British Parliament, abolished the two provinces and their separate parliaments, and created the Province of Canada, with a single Parliament for the entire province, composed of an elected Legislative Assembly and an appointed Legislative Council. The Governor General initially retained a strong position in the government.

Borne stood for election to the new Legislative Assembly in the first general election, in 1841, on an anti-union platform. He was elected by acclamation for the Rimouski riding. Borne was frequently absent during the first session of the new Parliament, and did not participate in the debate and vote on the union. During the sessions of 1841 and 1842, he generally aligned with the French-Canadian Group, in opposition to the government of Lord Sydenham.

In the run-up to the first elections for the Legislative Assembly, Robert Baldwin, leader of the Reform group in Canada West, and Louis-Hippolyte LaFontaine, a leader of moderate French-Canadian nationalists in Canada East, had been in discussions about an alliance, with the goal of implementing responsible government in the new Province of Canada. When LaFontaine was unable to win election, due to mob violence in his constituency, Baldwin arranged for his nomination to a vacant seat in the Toronto area. LaFontaine won the by-election and entered Parliament, where he became one of the leaders of the French-Canadian Group.

The next year, when Baldwin was defeated in a ministerial by-election, LaFontaine returned the favour, by encouraging Borne to resign his seat. Borne did so, out of a commitment to the emerging alliance between LaFontaine and Baldwin. When Baldwin was nominated in the resulting by-election in the Rimouski riding in January 1843, he won handily. The pro-reform voters in Rimouski elected him by acclamation, with cheering at the poll for Baldwin, LaFontaine and responsible government, even though Baldwin spoke no French and never set foot in the riding before the election.

Borne's disinterested decision to resign strengthened the political and personal bonds between LaFontaine and Baldwin, who eventually formed the first ministry under responsible government. The episode of each one finding a seat for the other in time of need was credited with helping to build trust and support between the two leaders and their supporters in each section of the Province of Canada. It also showed that political allegiances could be built on shared values, rather than on ethnicity.
