= Baraka (novel) =

1983 novel by John R. Saul

- Author: John Ralston Saul
- Series: Field Trilogy
- Release number: 1
- Publisher: Ballantine Books; Doubleday; Harlequin Enterprises
- Publication date: 1983
- ISBN: 0-246-12090-8
- Followed by: The Next Best Thing

Baraka, or the Lives, Fortunes and Sacred Honor of Anthony Smith (commonly referred to simply as Baraka Lives) is a novel written by Canadian writer and essayist John Ralston Saul. It was first published in 1983.

== Plot ==
The story involves a multinational oil company's attempts to gain oil rights in Vietnam by supporting an arms deal.

== Background ==
Baraka is the first book in Saul's Field Trilogy. The two other novels in the series are The Next Best Thing and The Paradise Eater, the latter of which won the Premio Letterario Internazionale in Italy.

The hardback edition (ISBN 0-246-12090-8) of Baraka is 350 pages. It was published by several publishers, including Ballantine Books, Doubleday and Gold Eagle (paperback).
