= LaFontaine-Baldwin Symposium =

Canadian forum

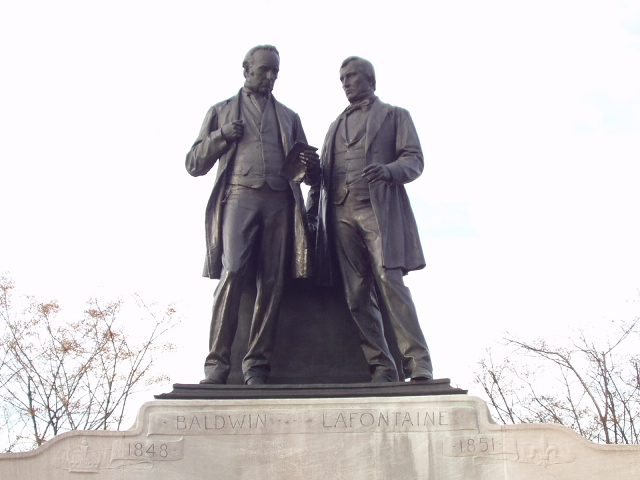
Statue of symposium's namesakes Robert Baldwin and Louis-Hippolyte Lafontaine, on Parliament Hill in Ottawa, Ontario.

The LaFontaine-Baldwin Symposium is a Canadian forum created through the joint effort of John Ralston Saul and the Dominion Institute (now named Historica Canada). Founded in 2000, the Symposium's purpose is to stimulate debate about the historical antecedents and future shape of the Canadian democracy. Canada's existence and democratic foundation owes a great deal to the partnership of two 19th-century political visionaries, Louis-Hippolyte LaFontaine and Robert Baldwin, the first democratically elected Joint Premiers of the Province of Canada. The Symposium's annual venue honours these two great political reformers.

According to Jocelyn Létourneau, a history professor at Université Laval in Quebec City and senior researcher at the Centre for Interdisciplinary Studies of Francophone Literature, Arts and Traditions in North America, "the myths we (Canadians) used in building our nation have made us victims of our past. And, it's not easy to break the cycle."

An annual lecture at the Symposium is broadcast on CBC Radio One's Ideas.

== Past speakers ==
- John Ralston Saul (2000)
- Alain Dubuc (2001)
- Georges Erasmus (2002)
- Beverley McLachlin (2003)
- David Malouf (2004)
- Louise Arbour (2005)
- George Elliott Clarke (2006)
- Adrienne Clarkson (2007)
- Sheila Watt-Cloutier (2009)
- His Highness the Aga Khan (2010)
- Naomi Klein (2016)
- Michael Sandel (2017)
- Sue Gardner (2018)
- Adam Gopnik (2019)
