= Canadian Academy of Independent Scholars =

Canadian independent scholars association

The Canadian Academy of Independent Scholars is a former association of independent scholars in Canada. One of the largest organizations for independent scholars in the world, it is patroned by John Ralston Saul. The academy was founded at Simon Fraser University, where it grew out of a series of informal discussions among academics known as the Philosophers' Café that began in the late 1990s. The organization became inactive in 2020 following the onset of the COVID-19 pandemic in Canada.
