= Baldwin Steps =

Staircase in Toronto

- Public stairs
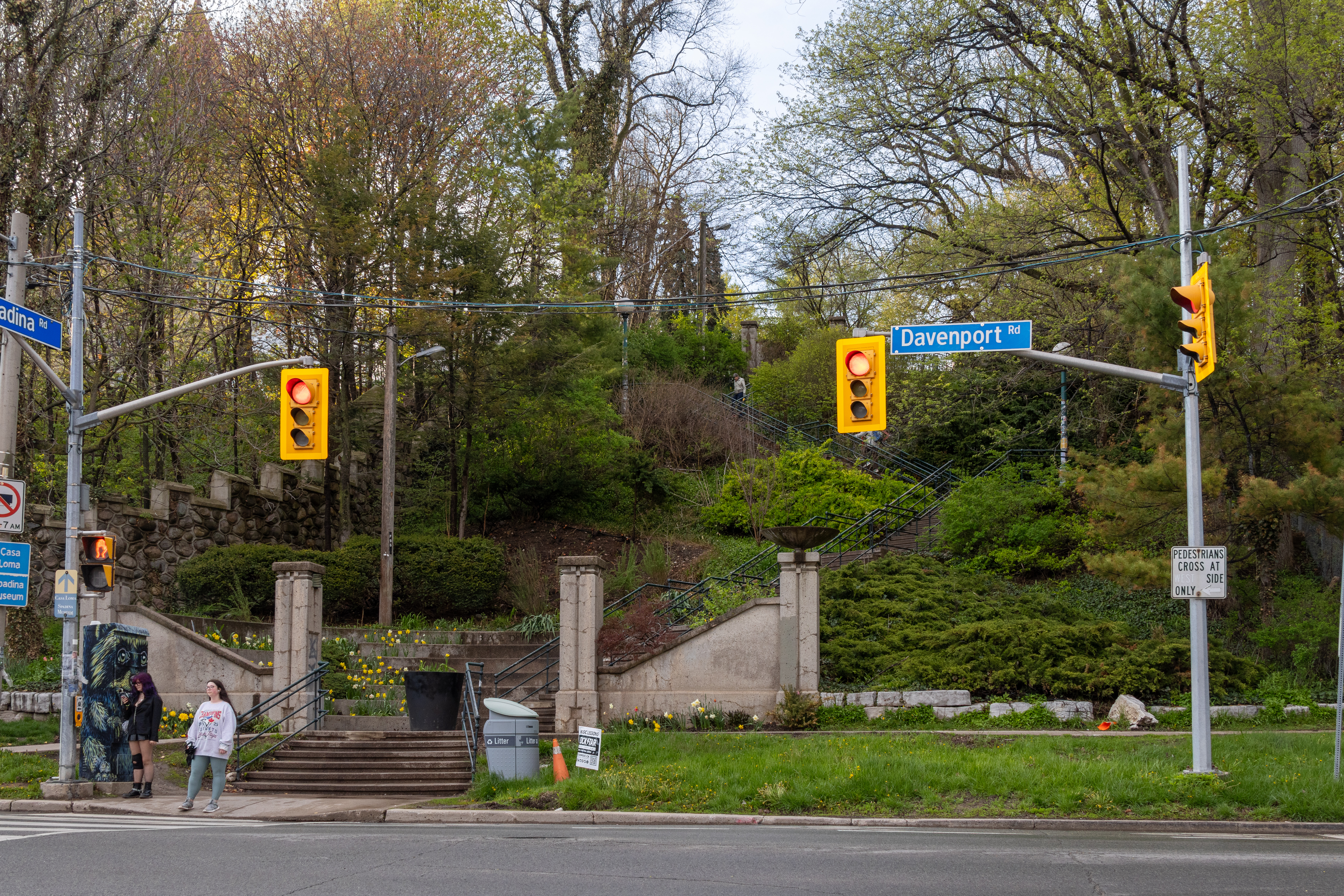
- Opened: 1913
- Steps: 110
- Dedicated to: Robert Baldwin and family
- Owner: City of Toronto
- Location: Intersection of Davenport and Spadina Road; Toronto, Ontario, Canada
- Location of Baldwin Steps in Toronto
- Coordinates: 43°40′39.55″N 79°24′29.78″W

The Baldwin Steps are a public outdoor staircase located in Toronto, Ontario, Canada dating from the 19th century. The Steps, which are constructed of stone and concrete, transcend a steep escarpment marking an ancient shoreline. The steps are named after the Baldwin family, which included Robert Baldwin, a former premier of Ontario, whose family were the first landowners. The Steps are also famous for appearing in the Scott Pilgrim graphic novels and its film adaptation, Scott Pilgrim vs. the World.

== History ==
The Steps are located on the shoreline cliff of ancient Lake Iroquois, along a public right-of-way connecting two sections of Spadina Road. The sheerness of the cliff prevented the construction of Spadina Road directly down the escarpment. Instead a roadway crossing of the escarpment was cut a few hundred yards to the west. A set of wooden steps were installed to allow people to move through the area. The original wooden stairs were replaced with a permanent structure in 1913 along the Spadina Road Alignment. Along the top of the cliff some of Toronto's most exclusive homes were constructed including Casa Loma and Spadina House.

In the 1960s the proposed Spadina Expressway would have replaced the stairs site with a six-lane highway exiting from a tunnel to the north. The Expressway project was cancelled in 1971 by the Government of Ontario which, as part of the project, took the land of the stairs as their own property. In 1984, the land was leased to the City of Toronto for 99 years. In 1987, the City rebuilt the Steps site with new railings, concrete stairs and expanded landings, following the original zig-zag path up the cliff. At this time, the Steps were given the formal name of the "Baldwin Steps" to commemorate the Baldwin family which owned the land before it became a public pathway. There are 110 steps from street level to the top, not 134 as is cited on some architectural sites.
