= John Ralston Saul =

Canadian writer and political philosopher

John Ralston Saul CC OOnt
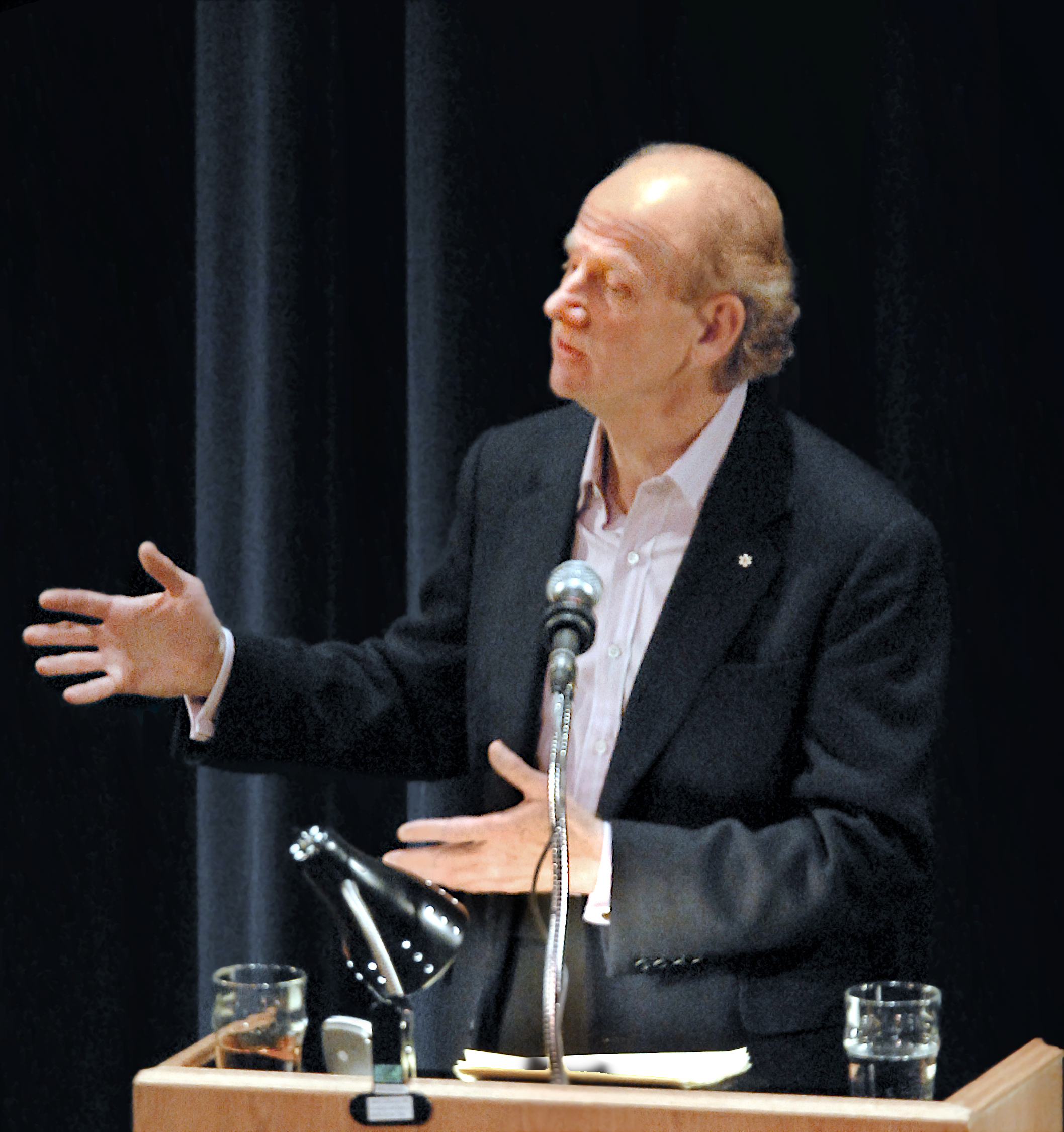
- Saul delivering a lecture at the University of Alberta in 2006

President of PEN International
- In office October 2009 – October 2015
- Preceded by: Jiří Gruša
- Succeeded by: Jennifer Clement

53rd Viceregal consort of Canada
- In office c. 1999 – September 27, 2005
- Governor General: Adrienne Clarkson
- Preceded by: Diana Fowler LeBlanc
- Succeeded by: Jean-Daniel Lafond

Personal details
- Born: 19 June 1947 (age 79) Ottawa, Ontario, Canada
- Spouse: Adrienne Clarkson (m. 1999)
- Education: McGill University; King's College, London
- Occupation: Writer; political philosopher

John Ralston Saul (born June 19, 1947) is a Canadian writer, political philosopher, and public intellectual. Saul is most widely known for his writings on the nature of individualism, citizenship and the public good; the failures of manager-led societies; the confusion between leadership and managerialism; military strategy, in particular irregular warfare; the role of freedom of speech and culture; and critiques of the prevailing economic paradigm. He is a champion of freedom of expression and was the International President of PEN International, an association of writers. Saul is the co-founder and co-chair of the Institute for Canadian Citizenship, a national charity promoting the inclusion of new citizens. He is also the co-founder and co-chair of 6 Degrees, the global forum for inclusion. Saul is also the husband to the former governor general Adrienne Clarkson, making him the Viceregal consort of Canada during most of her service (1999–2005).

His work is known for being thought-provoking and ahead of its time, leading him to be called a "prophet" by Time and to be included in Utne Reader's list of the world's leading thinkers and visionaries. His works have been translated into 25 languages in 36 countries.

== Early life and education ==
Saul is the son of William Saul, an army officer, and a British mother whose family had a long tradition of military service. He was born in Ottawa, but raised in Alberta and Manitoba before graduating from Oakville Trafalgar High School in Oakville, Ontario. At a young age, he became fluent in both national languages, French and English. By the time he started university at McGill University, Montreal, his father was in Paris and Brussels, working as a military adviser to the Canadian ambassador to NATO.

== Career ==
After completing his undergraduate degree, Saul was accepted into the foreign service, but the death of his father in 1968 changed Saul's career plans. He left the foreign service to attend King's College London, where he wrote his thesis on the modernization of France under Charles de Gaulle, and earned his PhD in 1972. His doctoral thesis, The Evolution of Civil–Military Relations in France after the Algerian War, led him to France for research. There he began to write his first novel, Mort d'un général, a romanticized version of his thesis on de Gaulle's chief of staff. He supported himself by running the French subsidiary of a British investment company.

After helping to set up the national oil company Petro-Canada in 1976, as assistant to its first chair, Maurice F. Strong, Saul published his first novel, The Birds of Prey, in 1977. Strong described Saul as "an invaluable, though unconventional, member of my personal staff."

Through the late 1970s into the 1980s, Saul travelled extensively and regularly spent time with guerrilla armies, spending a great deal of time in North Africa and South East Asia. Out of this time came his novels, The Field Trilogy. It was during those extended periods in Northwest Africa and Southeast Asia where he witnessed fellow writers there suffering government suppression of freedom of expression, which caused him to become interested in the work of PEN International. Between the years of 1990 and 1992, Saul acted as the president of the Canadian centre of PEN International. In 2009, he was elected president of PEN and re-elected for a second and last term in 2012, remaining International President until October 2015.

Saul is co-chair of the Institute for Canadian Citizenship, which encourages new Canadians to become active citizens. He is patron and former president of the Canadian Centre of PEN International and of the Canadian Academy of Independent Scholars. He is also founder and honorary chair of French for the Future, which encourages bilingual French-English education, chair of the advisory board for the LaFontaine-Baldwin Symposium lecture series, and a patron of Planned Lifetime Advocacy Network. From 1999 until 2006, his wife Adrienne Clarkson was Governor General of Canada, making him Canada's viceregal consort. During this period he devoted much of his time to issues of freedom of expression, poverty, public education and bilingualism.

=== PEN International ===
Saul was elected as the international president of PEN International for a three-year term at its Annual Congress in Linz, Austria in October 2009. He was the first Canadian to be elected to that position, which had previously been held by John Galsworthy, Arthur Miller, Heinrich Böll, Mario Vargas Llosa and Homero Aridjis. He campaigned on the need to pay attention to smaller and endangered languages and cultures, arguing that the ultimate removal of freedom of expression was the loss of a language. He put a specific emphasis on endangered indigenous languages. He called for a further decentralization of PEN, which has 144 centres in 102 countries. He argues that literature and freedom of expression are the same thing; that you cannot have one without the other. Saul has testified before the European Parliament Human Rights Commission on the loss of freedom of expression in Tunisia, has spoken before European Council on Refugees in Exile, and has published an essay on writers in exile, which has been translated into several languages.

=== The Institute for Canadian Citizenship ===
Saul founded, and currently co-chairs, the Institute for Canadian Citizenship (ICC) with Adrienne Clarkson. The ICC is a national, non-profit charity that helps accelerate new citizens' integration into Canadian life through original programs, collaborations and unique volunteer opportunities. While its focus is on encouraging new citizens to take their rightful place in Canada, the ICC aims to encourage all citizens – new or not – to embrace active citizenship in their daily life.

=== Speaking ===
In addition to his selection as the 1995 Massey lecturer, Saul has delivered other notable lectures. He gave the Harold Innis Lecture in 1994. In 2000 he gave the inaugural LaFontaine-Baldwin Symposium Lecture. Saul delivered the J.D. Young Memorial Lecture "A New Era of Irregular Warfare?" at the Royal Military College of Canada in Kingston, Ontario on February 4, 2004. He gave the 2005 IDEAS lecture in Brisbane, Australia, the 2007 Captive Mind Lecture in Kraków, Poland, and in 2008 gave the 33rd Sir Winston Scott Memorial Lecture in Barbados. He also delivered the 2009 McGill Law Journal's Annual Lecture at the McGill Faculty of Law in Montreal on February 3, 2009. Saul also spoke at the Sydney Opera House on August 26, 2012, on the subject "It's Broke: How do we fix it?"

=== Fiction writing ===
The Birds of Prey (1977) is a political novel based in Gaullist France. Between 1983 and 1988 Saul then published The Field Trilogy, which deals with the crisis of modern power and its clash with the individual. It includes Baraka, or The Lives, Fortunes and Sacred Honor of Anthony Smith (1983), The Next Best Thing (1986), and The Paradise Eater (1988), which won the Premio Letterario Internazionale in Italy.

De si bons Américains (1994) is a picaresque novel in which he observes the lives of America's nouveaux riches. A vastly reworked and expanded version was published in 2012 as Dark Diversions, Saul's first novel in over fifteen years.

=== Non-fiction writing ===
==== Voltaire's Bastards, The Doubter's Companion and The Unconscious Civilization ====
Saul's non-fiction began with the trilogy comprising the bestseller Voltaire's Bastards: The Dictatorship of Reason in the West (1992), the polemic philosophical dictionary The Doubter's Companion: A Dictionary of Aggressive Common Sense (1994), and the book that grew out of his 1995 Massey Lectures, The Unconscious Civilization (1995). The last won the 1996 Governor General's Award for Non-Fiction Literature.

These books deal with themes such as the dictatorship of reason unbalanced by other human qualities, how it can be used for any ends especially in a directionless state that rewards the pursuit of power for power's sake. He argues that this leads to deformations of thought such as ideology promoted as truth; the rational but anti-democratic structures of corporatism, by which he means the worship of small groups; and the use of language and expertise to mask a practical understanding of the harm caused by this, and what else our society might do. He argues that the rise of individualism with no regard for the role of society has not created greater individual autonomy and self-determination, as was once hoped, but isolation and alienation. He calls for a pursuit of a more humanist ideal in which reason is balanced with other human mental capacities such as common sense, ethics, intuition, creativity, and memory, for the sake of the common good, and he discusses the importance of unfettered language and practical democracy. These attributes are elaborated upon in his 2001 book On Equilibrium.

==== Reflections of a Siamese Twin ====
He expanded on these themes as they relate to Canada and its history and culture in Reflections of a Siamese Twin (1998). In this book, he proposed the idea of Canada being a "soft" country, meaning not that the nation is weak, but that it has a flexible and complex identity, as opposed to the unyielding or monolithic identities of other states.

He argues that Canada's complex national identity is made up of the "triangular reality" of the three nations that compose it: First Peoples, francophones, and anglophones. He emphasizes the willingness of these Canadian nations to compromise with one another, as opposed to resorting to open confrontations. In the same vein, he criticizes both those in the Quebec separatist Montreal School for emphasizing the conflicts in Canadian history and the Orange Order and the Clear Grits traditionally seeking clear definitions of Canadian-ness and loyalty.

==== On Equilibrium ====
Saul's next book, On Equilibrium (2001), is effectively a fourth, concluding volume to his philosophical quartet. He identifies six qualities as common to all people: common sense, ethics, imagination, intuition, memory, and reason. He describes how these inner forces can be used to balance each other, and what happens when they are unbalanced, for example in the case of a "Dictatorship of Reason".

==== The Collapse of Globalism ====
In an article written for Harper's magazine's March 2004 issue, titled The Collapse of Globalism and the Rebirth of Nationalism, he argued that the globalist ideology was under attack by counter-movements. Saul rethought and developed this argument in The Collapse of Globalism and the Reinvention of the World (2005). Far from being an inevitable force, Saul argued that globalization is already breaking down in the face of widespread public opposition and that the world was seeing a rise in nationalism. Following the Great Recession he had predicted, The Collapse of Globalism was re-issued in 2009 with a new epilogue that addressed the economic crisis.

==== A Fair Country ====
A Fair Country (2008) is Saul's second major work on Canada. It is organized into four subsections.

"A Métis Civilization"
This section picks up on the argument that Saul makes in Reflections of a Siamese Twin about the 'triangular reality of Canada'. Drawing on the work of scholars like Harold Innis and Gerald Friesen, Saul argues that contemporary Canada has been deeply influenced and shaped by Aboriginal ideas and the experience of both Francophone and Anglophone immigrants over the 250 years, from 1600 on, during which Aboriginals were either the dominant force in Canada, or equal partners. He argues that Aboriginals are making a rapid "comeback", and that their fundamental influence needs to be recognized in order for non-Aboriginal Canadians to understand themselves.

"Peace, Fairness, and Good Government"
In this section Saul argues that instead of the phrase "peace, order, and good government", which appears in and has become a touchstone of the 1867 Canadian Constitution, the phrase that dominated previous Canadian documents was "peace, welfare, and good government". Saul suggests that the ensuing emphasis on "order" has not truly represented Canadian origins.

"The Castrati"
This sections echoes Saul's more general critiques of technocratic and bureaucratic regimes. He also suggests that while current Canadian elites reflect a "disturbing mediocrity" this was not always the case.

"An Intentional Civilization"
Saul uses the final section of the book to argue for a return to an understanding of Canada as a unique response to particular historical circumstances.

==== Louis-Hippolyte LaFontaine and Robert Baldwin ====
Saul's contribution to Penguin Canada's Extraordinary Canadians series, of which he serves as general editor, is a double biography of Louis-Hippolyte Lafontaine and Robert Baldwin. In it, he argues that Canada did not begin in 1867, but that in fact its foundations were laid by LaFontaine and Baldwin much earlier. The two leaders of Lower and Upper Canada, respectively, worked together after the 1841 Union to lead a reformist movement for responsible government run by elected citizens instead of a colonial governor. But it was during the "Great Ministry" of 1848–51 that the two politicians implemented laws that Saul argues created a more equitable country. They revamped judicial institutions, created a public education system, made bilingualism official, designed a network of public roads, began a public postal system, and reformed municipal governance. Faced with opposition, and even violence, Saul contends that the two men united behind a set of principles and programs that formed modern Canada.

==== The Comeback ====
His most recent work, The Comeback: How Aboriginals Are Reclaiming Power and Influence (2014) was a shortlisted nominee for the 2015 Shaughnessy Cohen Prize for Political Writing. The "comeback" that Saul identifies in this new book emphasizes the strides that Aboriginal people have made in reversing years of population decline and "cultural oppression". As recently as seventy years ago it was widely assumed that Indians were disappearing, the victims of disease, starvation and their own ineptitude for modern civilization. Canada's Aboriginal population is growing in numbers and its cultural and political self-confidence seems boundless. In Saul's view, this observation, while obvious to anyone who studies the history, nonetheless needs hammering home. We are far more used to hearing about the dismal lives of Aboriginal people—their family dysfunction, their crime rates, their impoverished communities—than we are to being told they are a success story. Today's Aboriginal population, for all the problems that afflict it, has overcome incredible disadvantages to achieve what Saul calls "a position of power, influence and civilizational creativity" in Canadian society.

==== Other non-fiction writing ====
- Le Citoyen dans un cul-de-sac?: Anatomie d'une société en crise (1996)
- On Equilibrium: Six Qualities of the New Humanism (2001)
- The John W. Holmes Memorial Lecture (2004)
- Joseph Howe and the Battle for Freedom of Speech (2006)
- Le Grand Retour (2015) – French edition of The Comeback, translated by Daniel Poliquin

== Honours ==
Saul was made a Companion of the Order of Canada (CC) in 1999. He is also a chevalier of the Ordre des Arts et des Lettres of France (1996). His 21 honorary degrees range from McGill University and the University of Ottawa to Herzen University in Saint Petersburg, Russia. On October 16, 2019, he received his latest honorary degree from King's College London.

Ribbon bars of John Ralston Saul

Commonwealth honours
Country	Date	Appointment	Post-nominal letters
Canada	28 September 1999	Companion of the Order of Canada	CC
Canada	1999	Knight of Justice of the Order of St John	
Canada	2014	Order of Ontario	OOnt
Canada	6 February 2002	Queen Elizabeth II Golden Jubilee Medal (Canadian Version)	
Canada	6 February 2012	Queen Elizabeth II Diamond Jubilee Medal (Canadian Version)	

Foreign honours
Country	Date	Decoration	Post-nominal letters
France	1996	Chevalier of the Ordre des Arts et des Lettres	
Germany	2021	Officer's Cross, Order of Merit of the Federal Republic of Germany	

Scholastic achievements
Location	Date	School	Degree
Quebec	1969	McGill University	Bachelor of Arts (BA) in Political Science and History
England	1972	King's College London	Doctor of Philosophy (PhD)

Chancellor, visitor, governor, rector and fellowships
Location	Date	School	Position
Ontario	2015 – 2019	Ryerson University	Distinguished Visiting Professor (Faculty of Arts)
England		King's College London	Visiting Professor

Honorary degrees
Location	Date	School	Degree	Gave Commencement Address
Quebec	10 June 1997	McGill University	Doctor of Letters (D.Litt.)	Yes
British Columbia	5 October 2000	Simon Fraser University	Doctor of Laws (LL.D)	Yes
Manitoba	24 October 2002	University of Manitoba	Doctor of Laws (LL.D)	
Ontario	30 May 2003	Laurentian University	Doctor of Laws (LL.D.)	Yes
Ontario	2003	Queen's University	Doctor of Laws (LL.D)	
New Brunswick	2003	Mount Allison University	Doctor of Laws (LL.D.)	
Russian Federation	29 September 2003	Herzen University	Doctorate	Yes
Ontario	31 October 2004	University of Ottawa	Doctor of the University (D.Univ.)	Yes
Newfoundland and Labrador	May 2011	Memorial University of Newfoundland	Doctor of Letters (D.Litt.)	
Ontario	2011	Nipissing University	Doctor of Letters (D.Litt.)	
Manitoba	17 October 2014	University of Winnipeg	Doctor of Laws (LL.D)	Yes
Nova Scotia	Spring 2018	Dalhousie University	Doctor of Laws (LL.D.)	
England	16 October 2019	King's College London	Doctor of Letters (D.Litt.)	Yes
Ontario	9 June 2023	Ontario Tech University	Doctor of Laws	Yes
Ontario	19 June 2024	York University	Doctor of Law	Yes

== Awards ==
- Italy's Premio Letterario Internazionale, for The Paradise Eater (1990)
- Gordon Montador Award, for The Unconscious Civilization (1996)
- Governor General's Literary Award for Non-fiction, for The Unconscious Civilization (1996)
- Gordon Montador Award, for Reflections of a Siamese Twin (1998)
- Pablo Neruda International Presidential Medal of Honour (2004)
- Manhae Literary Prize (2010)
- Inaugural Gutenburg Galaxy Award for Literature (2011)
- Writers' Union of Canada's Freedom to Read Award (2011)

== Archives ==
There is a John Ralston Saul fonds at Library and Archives Canada.

Non-profit organization positions
Preceded by Jiří Gruša	International President of PEN International; 2009–2015	Succeeded by Jennifer Clement
Honorary titles
Preceded by Diana Fowler LeBlanc	Viceregal Consort of Canada; 1999–2005	Succeeded by Jean-Daniel Lafond
