= Louis Bertrand (Quebec seigneur) =

Canadian politician

Louis Bertrand (French pronunciation: [lwi bɛʁtʁɑ̃]; 12 October 1779 – 11 September 1871) was a Canadian seigneur, businessman and political figure.

Bertrand was born in Cap-Santé, Quebec in 1779. He worked as baker at the Petit Séminaire de Québec, then moved to L'Isle-Verte in 1811 and opened a store there. In 1818 and 1819, he leased the rights to the mill and seigneury at L'Isle-Verte; in 1849, he purchased the title to the seigneury. He built a sawmill and then another one in partnership with others. He also owned a wharf and boats at L'Isle-Verte. Bertrand was captain in the local militia, becoming lieutenant-colonel in 1862. He served as commissioner for the small claims tribunal. He was elected to represent Rimouski in the Legislative Assembly of Lower Canada in an 1832 by-election; he was reelected in 1834. Bertrand supported the Ninety-Two Resolutions. In 1844, he was elected to the Legislative Assembly of the Province of Canada for Rimouski. In 1845, he became the first mayor of L'Isle-Verte.

Bertrand died at L'Isle-Verte in 1871.

His son Charles was a member of the Canadian House of Commons.

His home at L'Isle-Verte, the Maison Louis-Bertrand, has been designated a National Historic Site of Canada.
