= Rimouski (Province of Canada electoral district) =

Electoral district in former Province of Canada

Province of Canada electoral district

Defunct pre-Confederation electoral district
- Legislature: Legislative Assembly of the Province of Canada
- District created: 1841
- District abolished: 1867
- First contested: 1841
- Last contested: 1863

Rimouski was an electoral district of the Legislative Assembly of the Parliament of the Province of Canada, in Canada East (now Quebec), in the Bas-Saint-Laurent region. It was created in 1841 and was based on the previous electoral district of the same name for the Legislative Assembly of Lower Canada. It was represented by one member in the Legislative Assembly.

The electoral district was abolished in 1867, upon the creation of Canada and the province of Quebec.

== Boundaries ==
The electoral district of Rimouski was on the south shore of the River Saint Lawrence at the beginning of the Gaspé peninsula (now in the Bas-Saint-Laurent administrative region).

=== 1841 to 1854 ===
The Union Act, 1840, passed by the British Parliament, merged the two provinces of Lower Canada and Upper Canada into the Province of Canada, with a single Parliament. The separate parliaments of Lower Canada and Upper Canada were abolished.

The Union Act provided that the pre-existing electoral boundaries of Lower Canada and Upper Canada would continue to be used in the new Parliament, unless altered by the Union Act itself. The Rimouski electoral district of Lower Canada was not altered by the Act, and therefore continued with the same boundaries which had been set by a statute of Lower Canada in 1829:

The County of Rimouski shall be bounded on the eastward by the Inferior District of Gaspé, on the southward by the south west boundary line of the Seigniory of Rivière du Loup prolonged to the southern bounds of the Province, and on the north west by the River Saint Lawrence, including all the Islands in the said River Saint Lawrence, in front of the said County, in whole or in part nearest the same, which said County so bounded, comprises the Seigniories of Rivière de Loup, Isle Verte, d'Artiguy, Trois Pistoles, Rioux des Trois Pistoles, Bic, Rimouski, Barnabé, Lepage, Thivierge, Mitis and Matane, and all other Seigniories and lands comprised within the said limits.

=== 1854 to 1867 ===
In 1853, the Parliament of the Province of Canada passed a new electoral map. The boundaries of Rimouski were altered to some extent by the new map, which came into force in the general elections of 1854:

The County of Rimouski shall be bounded on the east by the County of Gaspé, on the west by the south-western line of the parish of Saint Simon, prolonged to the limits of the Province, on the south-east by the County of Bonaventure and the southern limits of the Province, and on the north-west by the River Saint Lawrence, including all the Islands in the said River lying nearest to the said County of Rimouski and wholly or partly opposite thereto; the said County so bounded, comprising the Parishes and Settlements of Matane, Metis, Saint Joseph, Sainte Flavie, Sainte Luce, Saint Germain, Bic, Saint Fabien, Saint Simon, the Seigniories of Lake Metis and of Matapédia, and the Townships of MacNider, Matane, Saint Denis and the augmentation thereof, Cabot, Neigette, Macpés and Duquesne.

== Members of the Legislative Assembly (1841–1867) ==
Rimouski was a single-member constituency in the Legislative Assembly.

The following were the members of the Legislative Assembly for Rimouski. The party affiliations are based on the biographies of individual members given by the National Assembly of Quebec, as well as votes in the Legislative Assembly. "Party" was a fluid concept, especially during the early years of the Province of Canada.

Parliament	Members	Years in Office	Party
1st Parliament; 1841–1844	Michel Borne (Note: Resigned seat on December 15, 1842 to allow Robert Baldwin to stand for election: Côté, Appointments and Elections, p. 59, note (36).)	1841–1842	Anti-unionist; French-Canadian Group
1st Parliament; 1841–1844	Robert Baldwin (Note: Elected in by-election, January 30, 1843: Côté, Appointments and Elections, p. 59, note (37).)	1843–1844 (by-election)	Ultra Reformer
2nd Parliament; 1844–1847	Louis Bertrand	1844–1847	French-Canadian Group
3rd Parliament; 1848–1851	Joseph-Charles Taché	1848–1854	French-Canadian Group
4th Parliament; 1851–1854	Joseph-Charles Taché	1848–1854	Ministerialist
5th Parliament; 1854–1857	Joseph-Charles Taché (Note: Resigned seat on January 10, 1857: Côté, Appointments and Elections, p. 63, note (190).)	1854–1857	Bleu
5th Parliament; 1854–1857	Michel Guillaume Baby (Note: Elected in by-election on February 17, 1857: Côté, Appointments and Elections, p. 63, note (191).)	1857 (by-election)	Bleu
6th Parliament; 1858–1861	Michel Guillaume Baby	1858–1861	Bleu
7th Parliament; 1861–1863	George Sylvain	1861–1867	Moderate
8th Parliament; 1863–1867	George Sylvain	1861–1867	Confederation; Bleu

== Significant elections ==
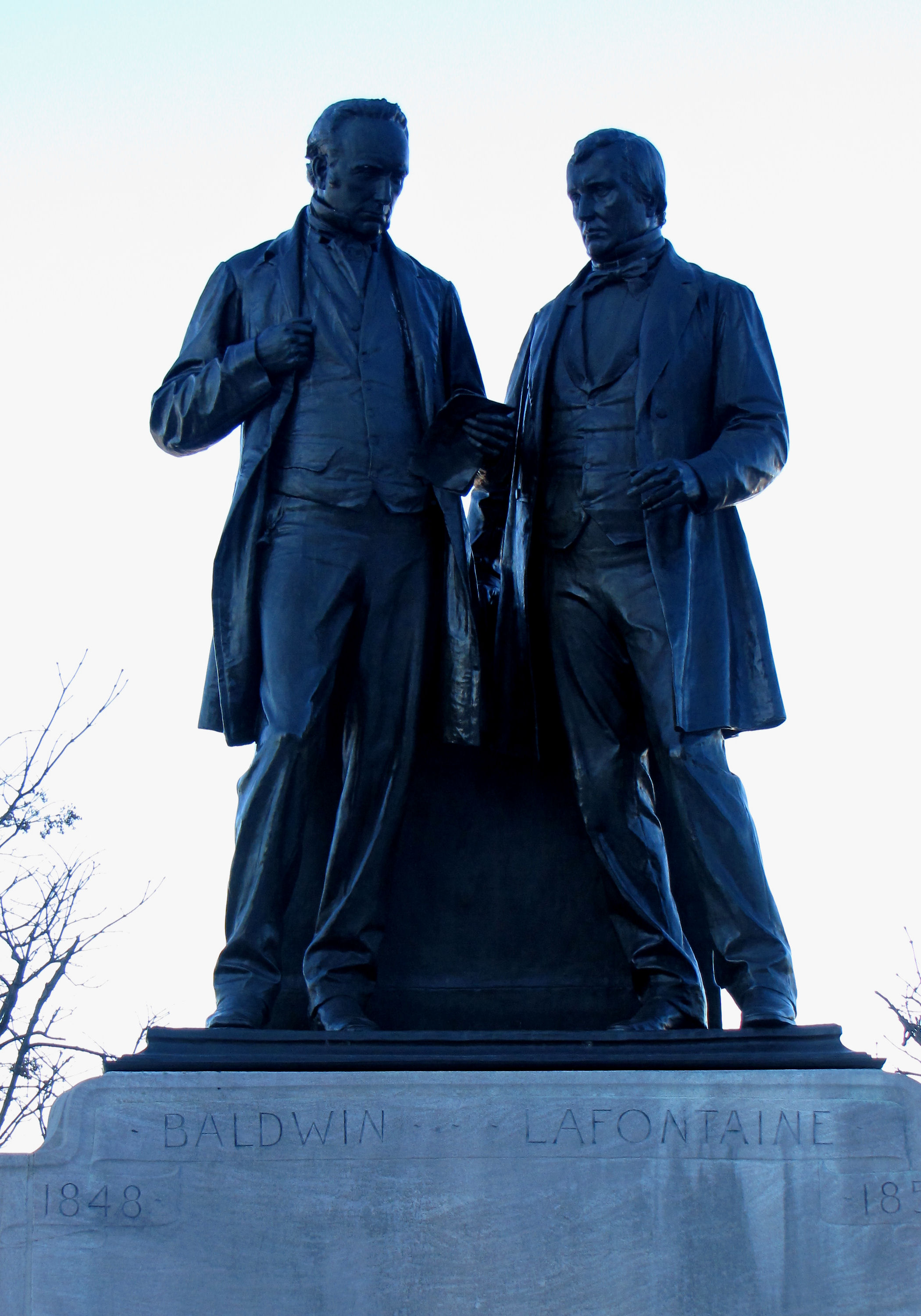
Monument to Lafontaine and Baldwin on Parliament Hill, Ottawa

In 1842, Louis-Hippolyte Lafontaine and Robert Baldwin formed the first joint ministry in the Province of Canada, and were appointed to the Executive Council by the Governor General. At that time, the law required that if members of the Legislative Assembly took a position under the Crown, the members' seats were vacated and they had to stand for re-election. Lafontaine was easily re-elected in his riding, but Baldwin was defeated in his riding of Hastings in Canada West.

To ensure his colleague could re-enter the Legislative Assembly, Lafontaine arranged for Michel Borne, the member for Rimouski, to resign his seat so Baldwin could stand for election there. (Borne was in his sixties and had infrequent attendance at Parliament.) Baldwin, an anglophone from Canada West, was elected by acclamation by the heavily francophone, but pro-reform, voters of Rimouski.

The by-election was important for the success of the Lafontaine-Baldwin alliance, and also as an early step in building political parties within the Province of Canada based on common political views, rather than purely ethnic affiliations.

== Abolition ==
The district was abolished on July 1, 1867, when the British North America Act, 1867 came into force, creating Canada and splitting the Province of Canada into Quebec and Ontario. It was succeeded by electoral districts of the same name and boundaries in the House of Commons of Canada and the Legislative Assembly of Quebec.

== See also ==
- List of elections in the Province of Canada
