= Scadding =

Scadding is a surname. Notable people with the surname include:

- Charles Scadding (1861–1914), Canadian-born, US-based Episcopal cleric
- Henry Scadding (1813–1901), Canadian author and clergyman
- John Scadding (1754–1824), Canadian settler
- John Guyett Scadding (1907–1999), British physician
- Les Scadding, English former mechanic and sport investor
