= Henry Scadding House =

Coordinates: 43.65466°N 79.38127°W

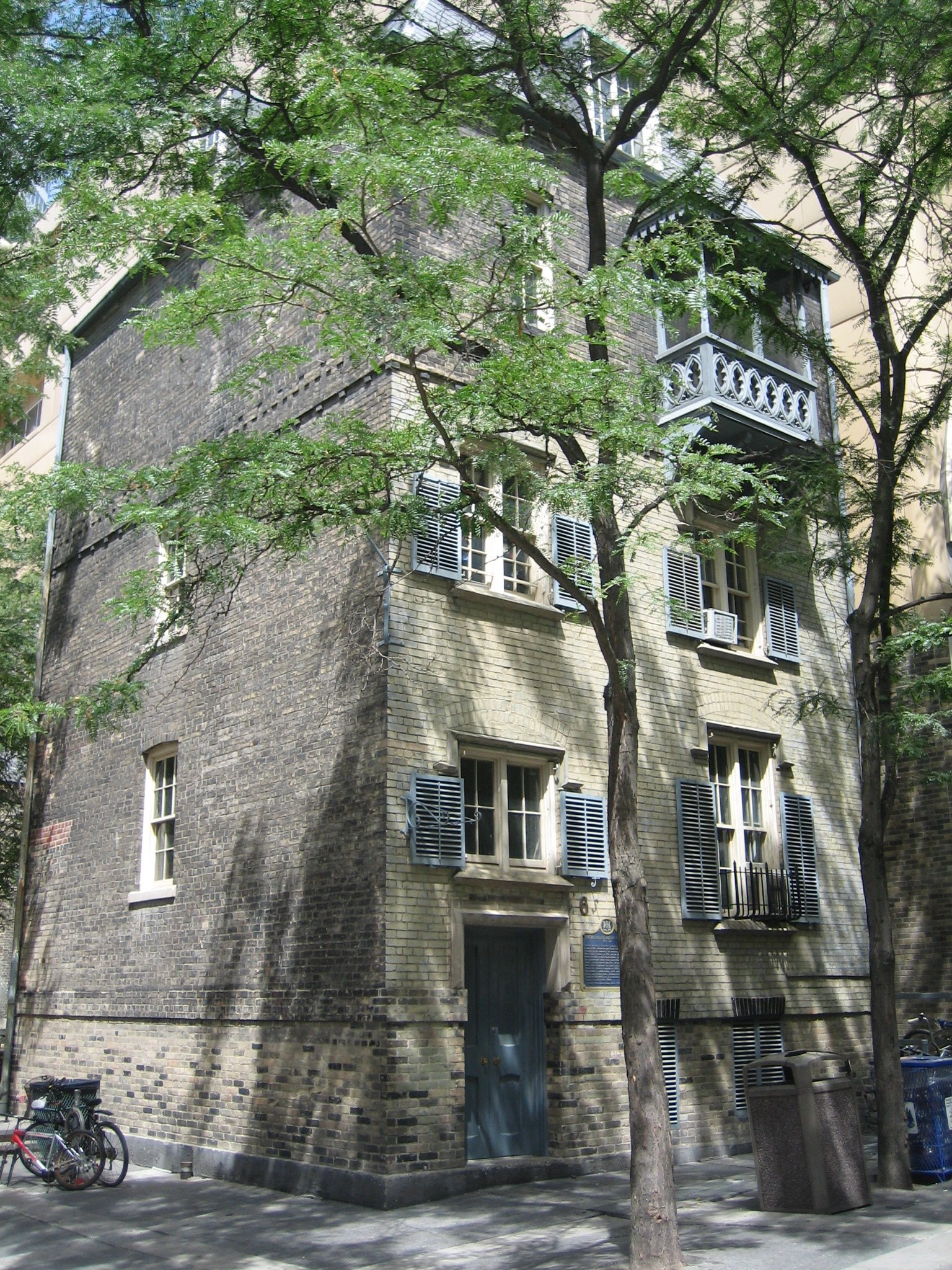
Henry Scadding House

The Henry Scadding House is a historic building located at 6 Trinity Square in Toronto, Ontario, Canada. It is situated behind the Toronto Eaton Centre and adjacent to the Church of the Holy Trinity.

It was built in 1862 as the home of the Reverend Henry Scadding, who was the rector of the Church of the Holy Trinity at that time.

== See also ==
- Scadding Cabin
- John Scadding
- List of oldest buildings and structures in Toronto
