= John Cox Cottage =

House in Toronto, Canada

Coordinates: 43.668647°N 79.352722°W

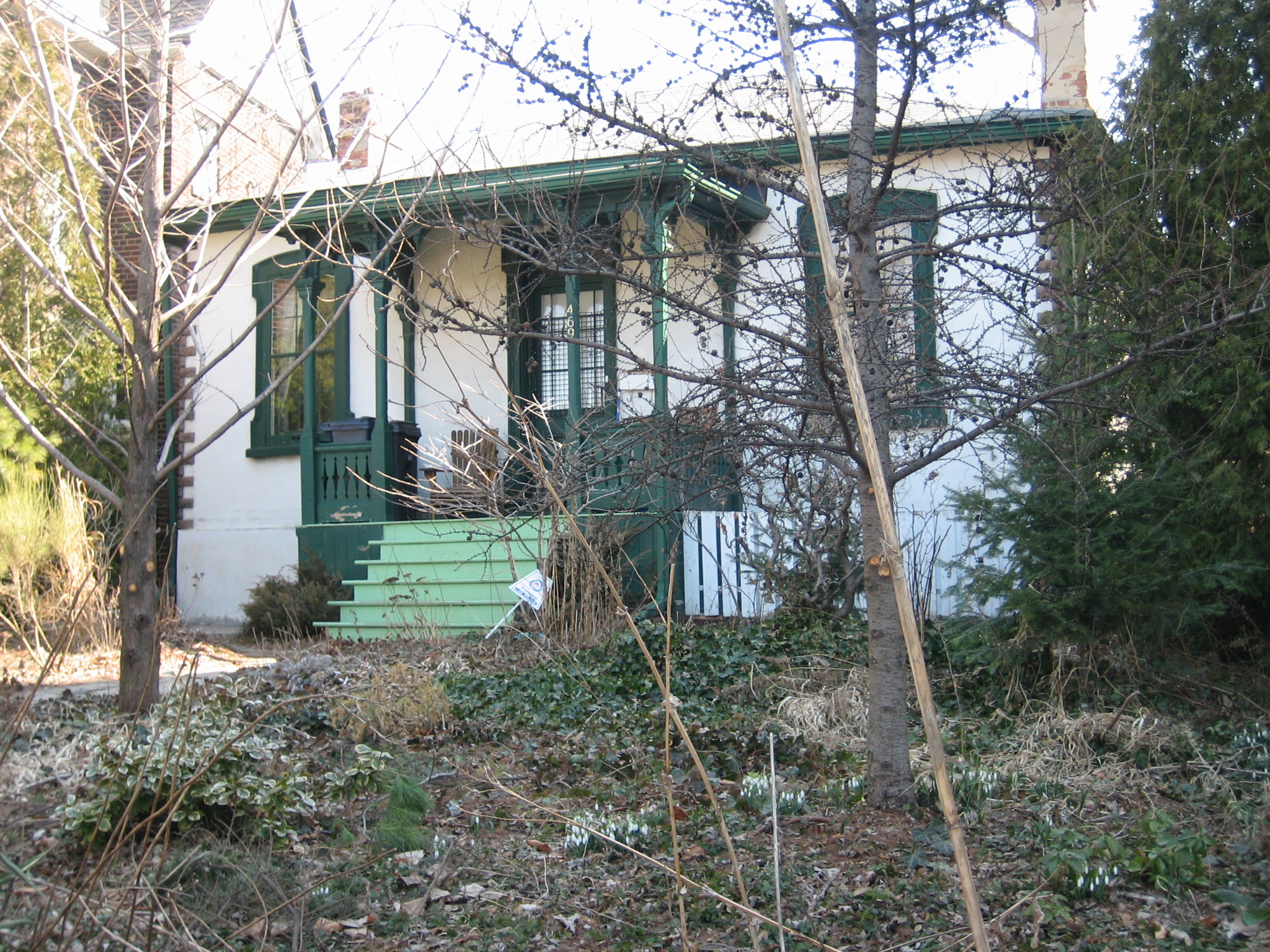
John Cox Cottage

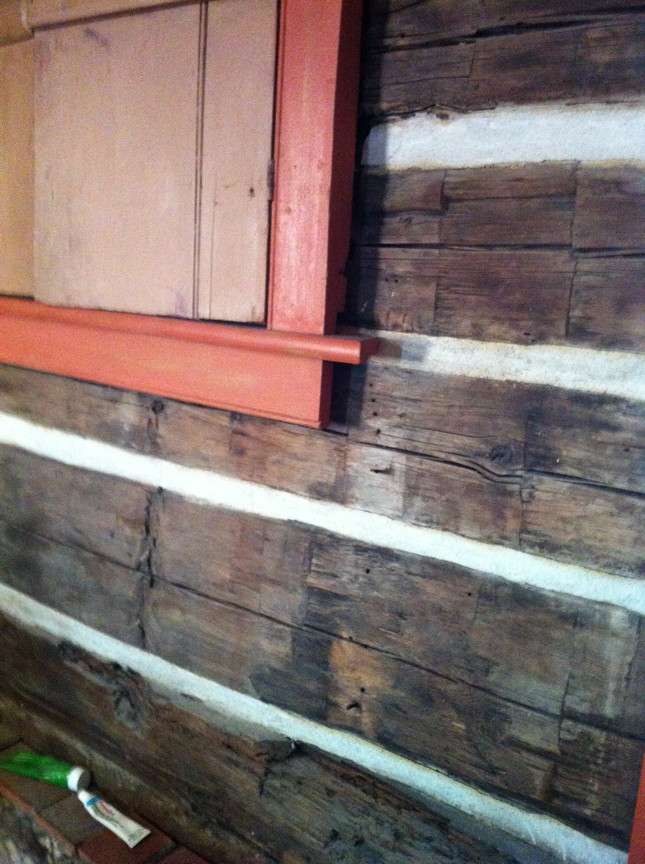
Exposed original square cut logs, as seen from inside the house

John Cox Cottage, at 469 Broadview Avenue, Toronto, Ontario, Canada, is the oldest known house in the city still used as a residence, and it still resides on its original site. The property, immediately to the east of what was John Scadding's original lot, was deeded to John Cox by Governor Simcoe in 1796.

The first stage of the structure was a small 16 foot (490 cm) × 24 foot (730 cm) log cabin facing due south, and was completed no later than 1807 — making it, arguably, the third oldest structure remaining in the city (and perhaps the second, should the Osterhout Log Cabin prove younger as artifacts appear to bear out).

It is older than both the Gibraltar Point Lighthouse, and the various barracks in Fort York.

Built originally out of square-cut logs (as is Scadding Cabin), it overlooks what is now Riverdale Park and is aligned in the traditional strict east–west orientation, making it appear somewhat twisted to the north of the Toronto street grid, which was built successively around it. This true east–west orientation allows for the maximum use of daylight hours, to minimize the use of the expensive artificial lighting options of the period.

The walls containing the living room - including the external south wall and half the west wall, plus half the internal east wall separating the kitchen and living room - remain concealed original log; while the northern parts where expanded during a very early Victorian renovation (completed by architectural firm Langley, Langley and Burke). Some of the original square cut logs from the east wall, looking remarkably like Scadding cabin, are still visible from inside a recent rear kitchen addition. The kitchen addition itself has kept with the spirit of the house, built using logs from a carefully disassembled "younger" log cabin (circa ~1840): however, the size, cutting and precision of the original logs closely matches those of Scadding Cabin, built by The Queen's York Rangers, and can be differentiated by eye from those of the latter addition.

The original attic with its cedar roof still survives under the later Victorian roof and is visible from inside the house.

== See also ==
- List of oldest buildings and structures in Toronto
- Log building
