= Riverdale Farm =

Urban park in Toronto, Canada

Coordinates: 43.667111°N 79.361294°W

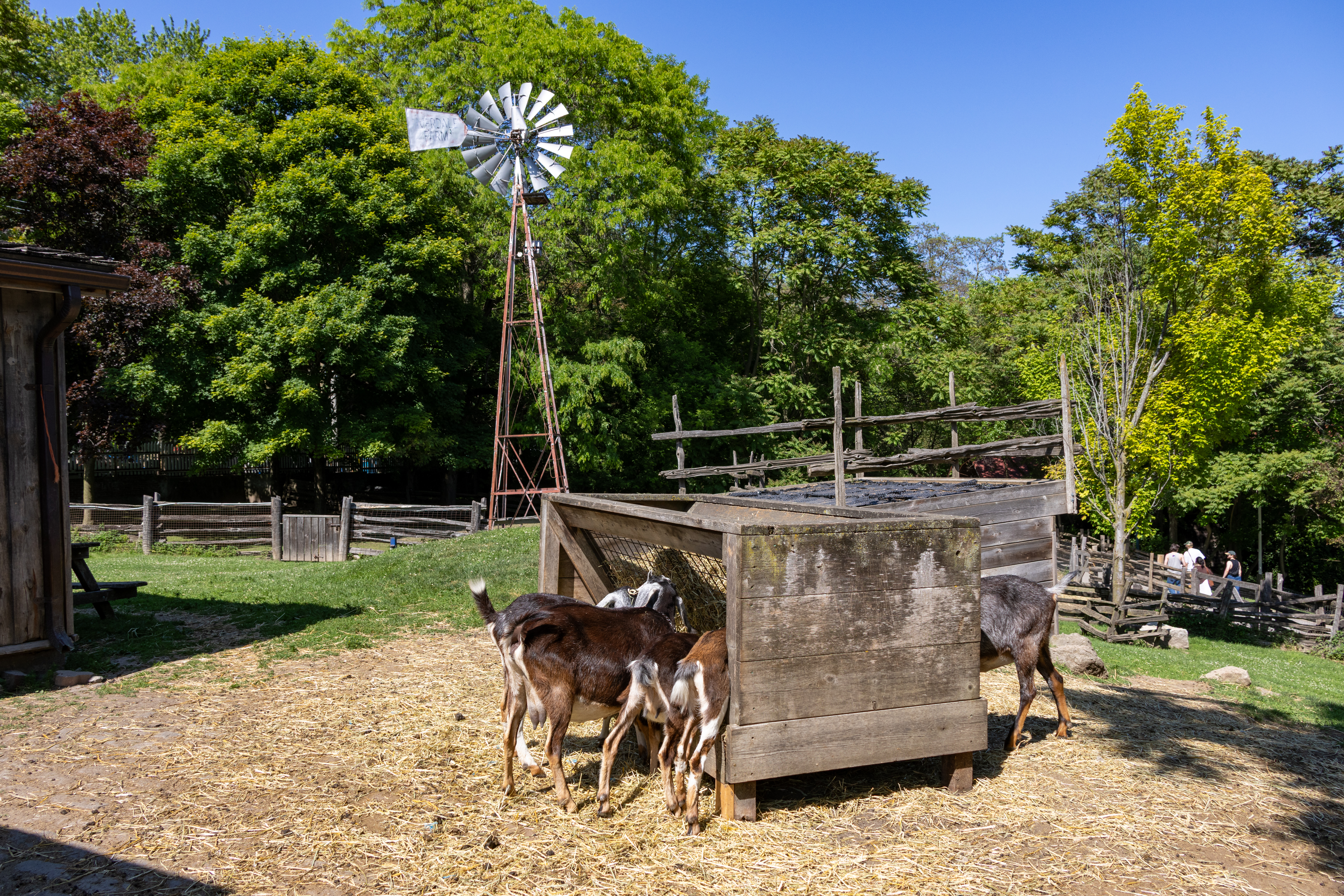
- Riverdale Farm in June 2025
- Interactive map of Riverdale Farm
- Date opened: 1978
- Location: Cabbagetown, Toronto, Ontario, Canada

Riverdale Farm is a 3-hectare (7.4-acre) municipally operated farm in the heart of Cabbagetown, an urban neighbourhood in Toronto, Ontario, Canada. It is maintained by Toronto Parks, Forestry and Recreation Division.

== History ==
Between 1888 and 1974, this was the site of the Riverdale Zoo. This zoo began with the donation of deer by Toronto Alderman Daniel Lamb. In 1974, the zoo relocated to a much larger facility in Scarborough and became the Toronto Zoo. In 1978, Riverdale Farm opened on the west bank of the Don River adjacent to Riverdale Park. The main barn was first constructed in 1858 in Markham and moved to the present site and rebuilt in 1977. The farm is open to the public all year round. It specializes in pioneer breeds of farm animals that are hard to find on commercial farms. Animals at the farm include poultry, waterfowl, goats, sheep, pigs, cows, donkeys, and horses.

A 2011 consultant's report recommended the closure of the farm, along with the High Park Zoo, as a means to cut cost for the city. In 2013, the W. Garfield Weston Foundation made a CAD $25,000 donation to provide funds to keep the farm operating in the short term. Other corporate and private donors have provided substantial financial injections to allow the Farm to continue operations for current and future generations through 2027.

== See also ==
- Centreville Far Enough Farm
