= Riverdale Park (Toronto) =

Urban park in Toronto, Canada

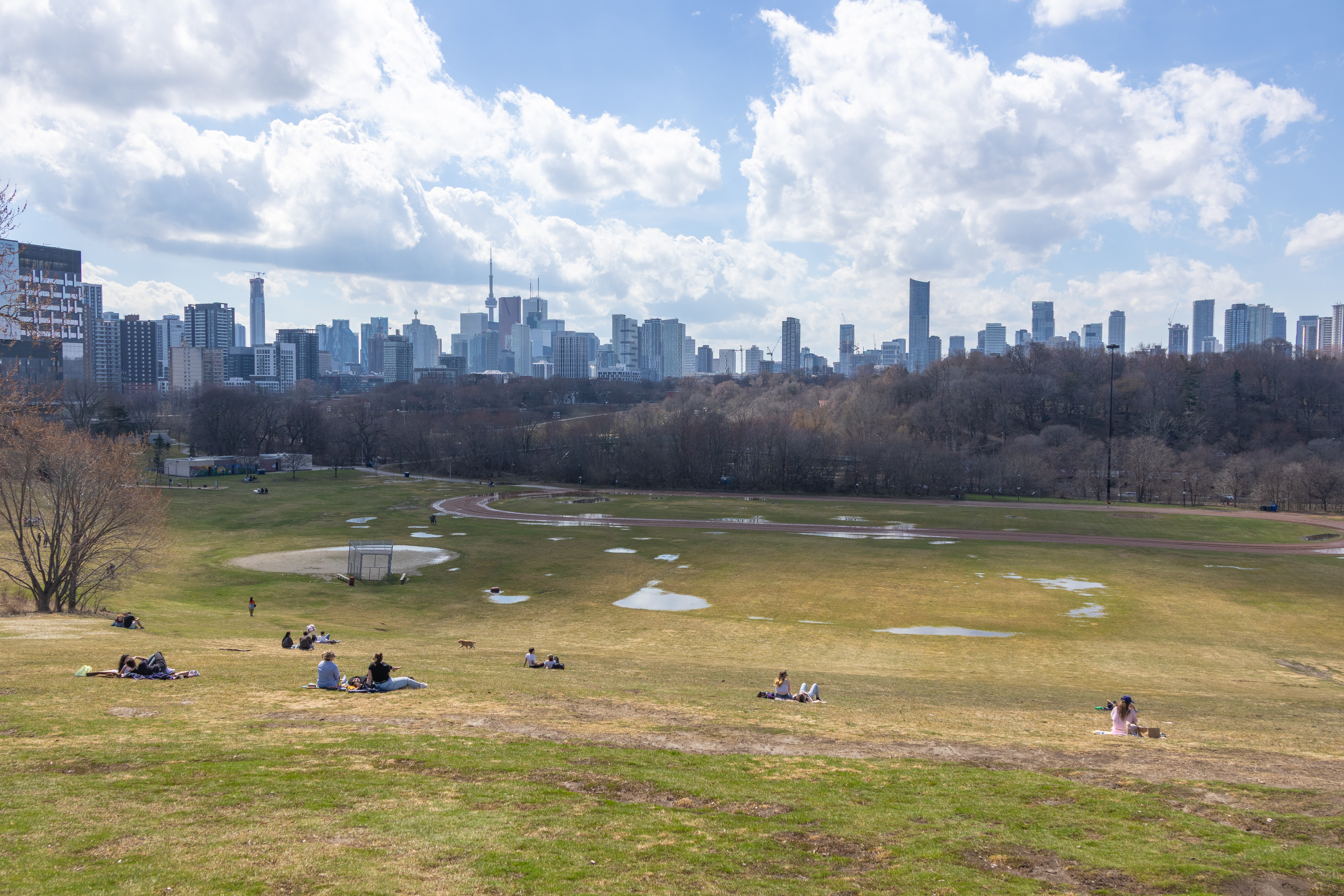
- Riverdale Park looking south-west towards the Toronto Skyline, April 2026

- Location within Toronto
- Type: Public Park
- Location: Toronto, Ontario
- Coordinates: 43°40′11″N 79°21′20″W
- Area: 104 acres (42 ha)
- Created: 1880
- Operator: City of Toronto

Riverdale Park is a large park spanning the Lower Don River in Toronto, Ontario, Canada, between Cabbagetown to the west and Broadview Avenue in Riverdale to the east.

== Description ==
The park has recreational fields for soccer, baseball, and Ultimate on both sides of the river. There is also a swimming pool, tennis courts and outdoor hockey rink to the northeast, and a running track in the centre. A footbridge crosses the Don Valley Parkway, Bayview Avenue, the Canadian National Railway Bala subdivision tracks, and the river and joins the two sides of the valley as well as the Lower Don Recreational Trail that follows the river. The bridge is located near the site of a butternut tree bridge built by Ely Playter that provided access to his property and mill around the 1790s. The bridge is depicted by Elizabeth Simcoe's watercolour painting Playter's Bridge near York, ca. 1796.

At the south-east corner of the park is Bridgepoint Hospital and a monument to Sun Yat-Sen. Immediately to the west of the park in Cabbagetown is Riverdale Farm, a city operated, publicly accessible farm.

In the summer, a free movie series takes place in the park. According to its website, "Everyone is welcome ~ Bring a picnic, friends and family to enjoy great PG rated films under the stars. All the films begin at dusk"

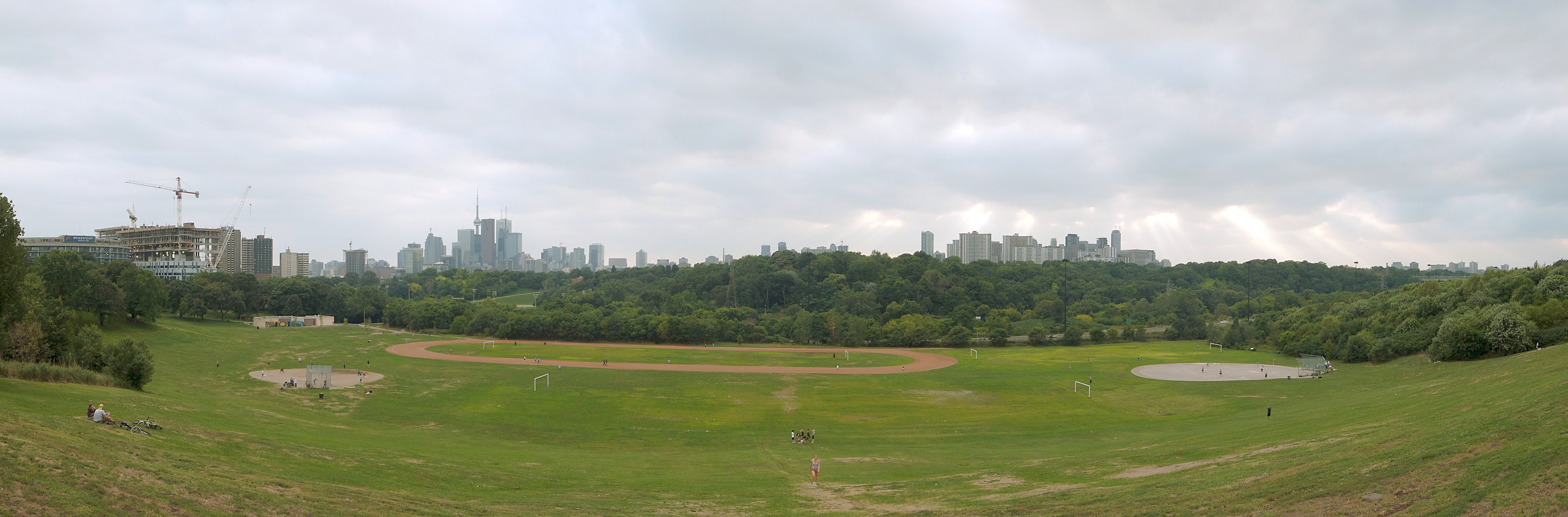
Riverdale Park

== History ==
The land on the east side of the Don River was originally owned by John Scadding, one of the early settlers to Toronto and the estate manager and clerk for John Graves Simcoe, Governor of Upper Canada. John Scadding's cabin, built in 1794 just south of the present day park, was relocated to the grounds of the Canadian National Exhibition in 1879. 120 acres (49 ha) of Scadding's farm property had been purchased by the City of Toronto in 1856 for the Don Jail, and the rest of the lands opened as a park in 1880. The park acquired a few 32-pounder cannon from Quebec City with one still located at the park near St Matthew’s Clubhouse and one since relocated to Marie Curtis Park. More land was added later to bring the park up to 162 acres (66 ha) in size, but the construction of the Don Valley Parkway in the 1960s reduced this to the current figure of 104 acres (42 ha). On Broadview Avenue east of the park is John Cox Cottage, an 1807 log home.

In 1886, road construction immediately east of the park uncovered artifacts of a First Nations settlement or encampment on the area above the valley. A small number of artifacts are on display in a display case at Withrow Avenue Junior Public School. A plaque is affixed to the main entrance of the school on Bain Avenue.

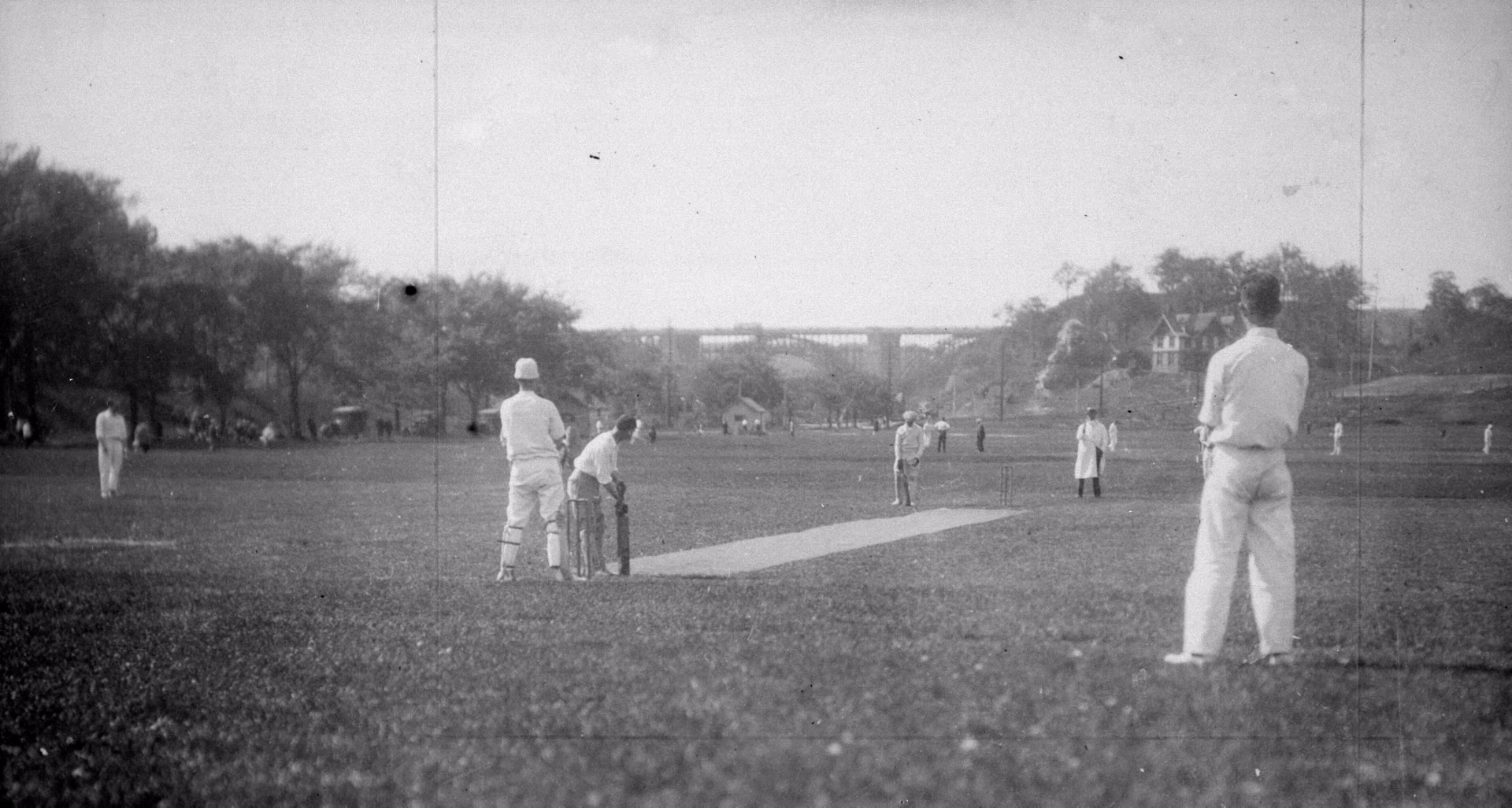
Cricket in Riverdale Park, 1923

The eastern side of the park was also used as a landfill in the 1920s. A walk along Broadview Avenue shows the evidence of this in the form of green exhaust pipes to vent the methane gas from the former dump beneath the park.

In the 1970s, the park was the original site proposed for a new 40,000 seat stadium, a project that would eventually become SkyDome. The plan was eventually abandoned, in part due to the strong objections of local Alderman John Sewell.

In 1990, a grassy slope on the eastern side was planted with trees. This was the first public event hosted by the Task Force to Bring Back the Don. The slope is now moderately forested with trees averaging 3–4 metres in height. In 2002, Bring Back the Don created a small marsh at the bottom of the slope. Water collects there from the slope as well as from adjacent playing fields. Other restoration projects include trees planted along a berm adjacent to the Don Valley Parkway.
