= Sharon Temple =

Sharon's history museum

Sharon Temple National Historic Site
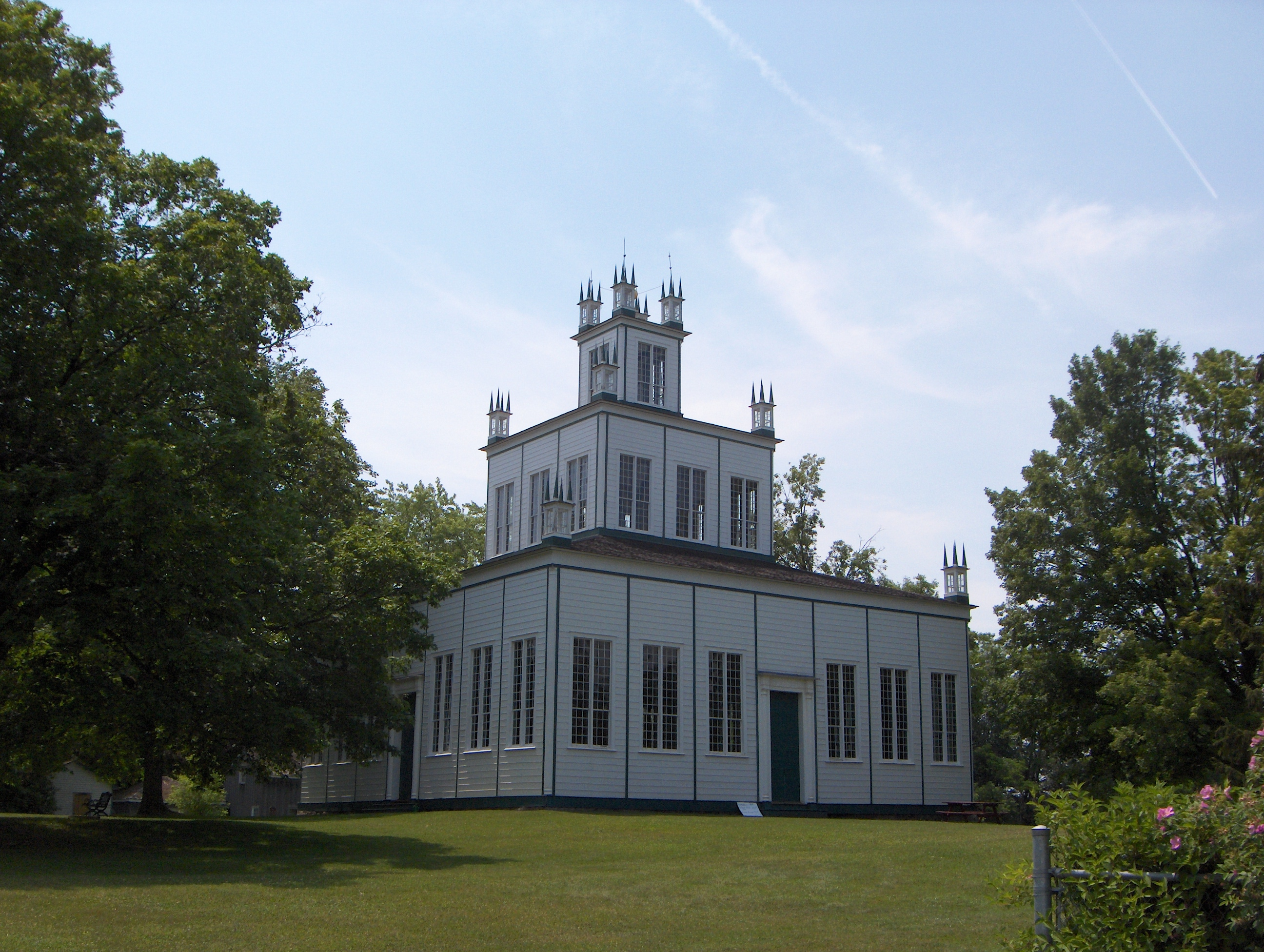

- Sharon, ON
- Established: 1832
- Location: 18974 Leslie St., Sharon, ON
- Coordinates: 44.101332°N 79.441874°W
- Public transit access: GO Transit
- Website: Sharon Temple

National Historic Site of Canada
- Designated: 1990

The Sharon Temple is an open-air museum site, located in the village of Sharon, Ontario, that was in 1990 designated as a National Historic Site of Canada. It is composed of eight heritage buildings and dwellings, and houses 6,000 artifacts on a 1.8 ha site. The building is made available for public use such as tours, concerts, weddings, and special occasions by its current owner, the Sharon Temple Museum Society.

It was constructed between 1825 and 1832 by The Children of Peace, a sect led by former Quaker David Willson on whose property it was built. Other restored buildings include David Willson's Study, which is a smaller building. The Ebenezer Doan house of 1819, constructed by the temple's master-builder and relocated from the former Doan family farm nearby, has been restored in an early garden setting. Also on site are the "cook house" where communal meals were created and served, the "drive shed' complete with period carriages, and another of David Willson's architectural curiosities, the round outhouse. The Ontario Heritage Trust has a public easement to ensure its preservation meets conservation standards.

== The historic structure and its traditional uses ==
=== The Children of Peace ===
The leader of the sect was David Willson, who was born in New York State in 1778 and migrated to Upper Canada in 1801. He joined the Quakers of which his wife was a member, but his ministry was rejected when he began to preach at the beginning of the War of 1812. His sect placed great emphasis on ceremony, music and practical education. Followers of the sect were strong political reformers and Willson played a critical role in the creation of the Canadian Alliance Society, the first political party in the province. Several members joined William Lyon Mackenzie in the 1837 Upper Canada Rebellion. They continued to play a key role in the development of democracy in Canada by ensuring the elections of both "fathers of responsible government," Robert Baldwin and Louis LaFontaine, in their riding despite threats of political violence by the Orange Order. After Willson's death in 1866 the sect slowly diminished. The last service was held in the temple in 1889.

=== Symbolism ===
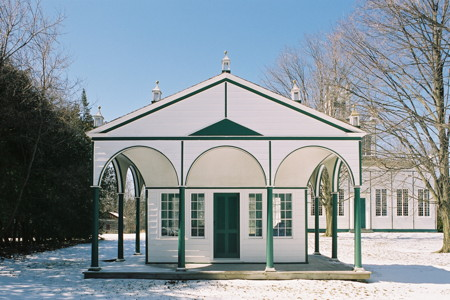
David Willson's Study, Sharon Temple Museum

Called by a vision to "ornament the Christian Church with all the glory of Israel,” the Children of Peace rebuilt Solomon's Temple as the seat of their "New Jerusalem.” This three-tiered building was "calculated to inspire the beholder with astonishment; its dimensions – its architecture – its situation – are all so extraordinary.” The Children of Peace, having fled a cruel and uncaring English pharaoh, viewed themselves as new Israelites lost in the wilderness of Upper Canada. The symbolism of the temple is a careful blending of Quaker tradition and Old Testament imagery. The temple was built square (unlike Quaker meeting houses) signifying "dealing on the square with all people. The door in the centre of the four sides is to let the people come in from the east and west, the north and south on equal and the same footing." At the centre of the building is the "ark" containing a bible open to the ten commandments. The ark is surrounded by four pillars: "Faith, Hope, Love and Charity" – the pillars of the church. Surrounding these inner pillars are twelve more, named after the disciples. The temple rises more than seventy feet (21 m) in three diminishing storeys, representing the Trinity. At each corner of the roof on every storey is an ornate lantern, capped with four golden spires; these twelve lanterns, "when illuminated," are "symbolical of the twelve apostles going out into the world to preach salvation." At the apex of the temple, suspended between the top four lanterns, is a golden globe; on this, the highest point in the village of Hope, they inscribed their highest hope – peace to the world.

=== Uses ===
The temple is an architectural representation of the Children of Peace's vision of a society based on the values of peace, equality, and social justice. The building was used once a month to collect alms for the poor, for two special feasts, and on Christmas; two other meeting houses in the village of "Hope" (now Sharon) were used for regular Sunday worship.

The "Illumination" was an evening service held by candle-light in association with the group's two annual feasts: the Feast of the Passover on David Willson's birthday in June, and the Feast of the First Fruits on the first Friday evening in September. The feast held the next day attracted over a thousand.

These Illumination ceremonies were also used for political purposes. For example, Willson timed election rallies for Members of Parliament Robert Baldwin and Louis LaFontaine to coincide with the Illumination and Feasts in 1843.

=== Ebenezer Doan, master builder ===
The "Master Builder" or architect-contractor in charge of designing and building the Sharon Temple is Ebenezer Doan (1772–1866). Doan was a highly accomplished builder, as evidenced by the creative techniques used in the temple structure. The simple rock foundation does not even go below the frost line; yet the building remains structurally sound after more than 175 years. Doan was an early Quaker immigrant from Bucks County, Pennsylvania, who joined the Children of Peace in 1812. His first house (1819), drive shed and granary have now been relocated on the temple grounds and restored.

== The temple as museum ==
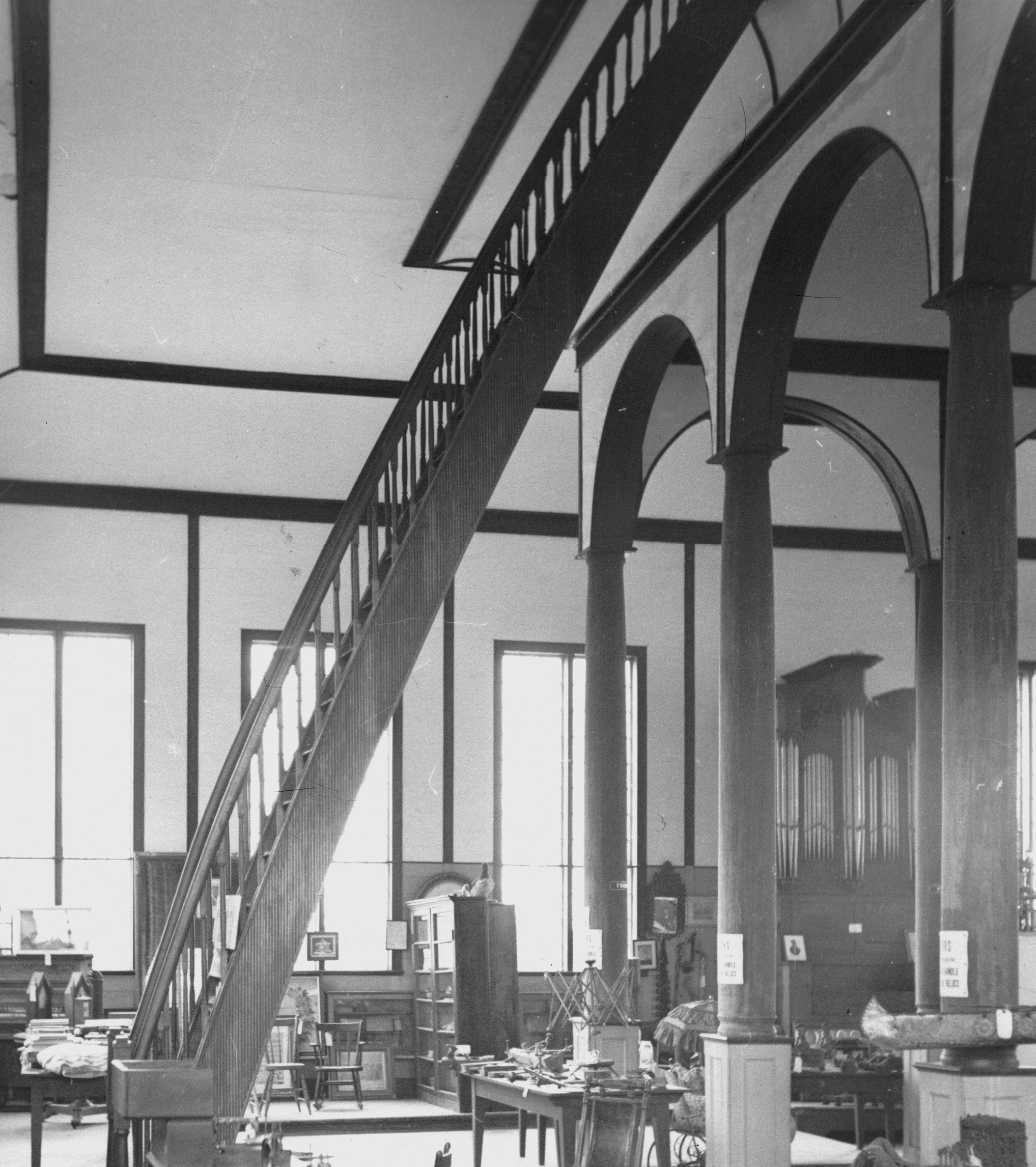
Sharon Temple Museum in the 1950s

=== The York Pioneer & Historical Society Period ===
Under the impetus of the Rev. James L. Hughes, the Toronto-based York Pioneer and Historical Society raised funds to purchase the temple and its grounds in 1917 and opened the temple as a museum in 1918. Shortly afterwards, the York Pioneers moved David Willson's study to the site. This is significant as one of the earliest examples of historic preservation in Canada, one of the reasons for which the temple received its National Historic Designation in 1993. The York Pioneers collected artifacts from throughout York County and created a county museum and park, which they displayed in the temple. A baseball diamond, recreation area and refreshment stand were added on the surrounding grounds. In the 1950s, the site's focus began to change, emphasizing the story of the Children of Peace. The York Pioneers restored and moved the 1819 home of Ebenezer Doan, master builder of the temple, and a log house associated with Jesse Doan, bandmaster of the Children of Peace, to the site. These acquisitions were followed in 1967, Canada's centennial year, by the construction of an exhibit building. The baseball diamond and other remnants of the park's early days were removed. Lastly, they moved the Cookhouse, and the Gatehouse, to the temple grounds.

==== Music at Sharon ====
To celebrate the 150th anniversary of the completion of the temple in 1981, the York Pioneer and Historical Society founded "Music at Sharon," an annual summer concert series with Lawrence Cherney as artistic director. The series was presented from 1981 to 1990. The concerts grew in number from five in the inaugural season to fourteen in 1989; in 1990 the entire festival was given over to the production of Serinette, a commissioned opera by Harry Somers. Music at Sharon commissioned new works by John Beckwith (Three Motets on Swan's 'China'), Phil Nimmons, Linda C. Smith, Carol Ann Weaver, Glen Buhr, Derek Holman, and many others. A commemorative album of the first series featuring the Elmer Iseler Singers and an instrumental ensemble directed by John Beckwith was issued (1982, Melbourne SMLP-4041/RCI 554). The majority of the concerts were broadcast on CBC radio.

==== Samuel Lount, the film ====
The 1985 film Samuel Lount was largely filmed on the temple site, and released in December 1985. It was produced by Elivira Lount, a descendant of the martyr of the Rebellion of 1837, and written and directed by Laurence Keane. R.H. Thomson appeared as Samuel Lount and David Fox as David Willson.

==== Serinette, the opera ====
Serinette, a 'Festival opera' in two acts with music by Harry Somers and libretto by James Reaney, was commissioned with the support of the Canada Council and the Ontario Arts Council for the tenth season (1990) of Music at Sharon; it was designed specifically for production in the temple. It premiered on 7 July 1990, and was broadcast on CBC radio's 'Saturday Afternoon at the Opera'. The production was conducted by Victor Feldbrill, directed by Keith Turnbull, and designed by Sue LePage. Reaney's libretto is based on an historical feud between the Ridout and Jarvis families in the 1830s, and the attraction of the fictitious central figure, Colin Jarvis ('younger brother' of the historical Samuel Jarvis) to the utopian community at Sharon. A central symbol is the "serinette," a mechanical singing bird imported from Europe. Each act began with the performers and audience processing into the building; the finale was performed inside the candle-lit Temple with the spectators observing from outside, in imitation of the original annual "illumination" of the temple. The success of the opera led to the rebirth of the now annual tradition of a fall "illumination." The work calls for 14 singer-actors, and a 12-piece chamber orchestra.

=== The Sharon Temple Museum Society ===
In 1991 the charitable, not-for-profit Sharon Temple Museum Society was created, and it assumed the obligations of the York Pioneer and Historical Society, and now owns and maintains the site and its legacy of buildings, artifacts and documents.

The temple is now a National Historic Site and museum as well as a National Peace Site. The 2010 album The Wind That Shakes the Barley by Loreena McKennitt was recorded there in the summer of 2010. McKennitt remarked, "There is a fascinating interplay between architecture and sound, visually and sonically. The temple inspired us all." The site and grounds are kept busy and host numerous public and private events.

== Restoration ==
Since the temple was rescued from demolition by the York Pioneer and Historical Society in 1917, the building has undergone periodic restoration work but without significant structural intervention. The Ontario Heritage Foundation funded extensive restoration of the exterior in 1995 and currently holds a conservation easement on this and other buildings on the site. Further extensive work was accomplished with an Infrastructure Stimulus Fund grant. The most recent work includes: restoration of a wood shingle roof, exterior painting, full reglazing of Temple windows (1993); partial restoration of the Arc, replacement of the gold globe (1996); remedial repair to the floors (1998); restoration and painting of the temple doors (2001); repainting ground floor windows (2003); ceiling plaster repairs on interior of Temple (2005); foundation repairs, installation of fire detection system (2011).

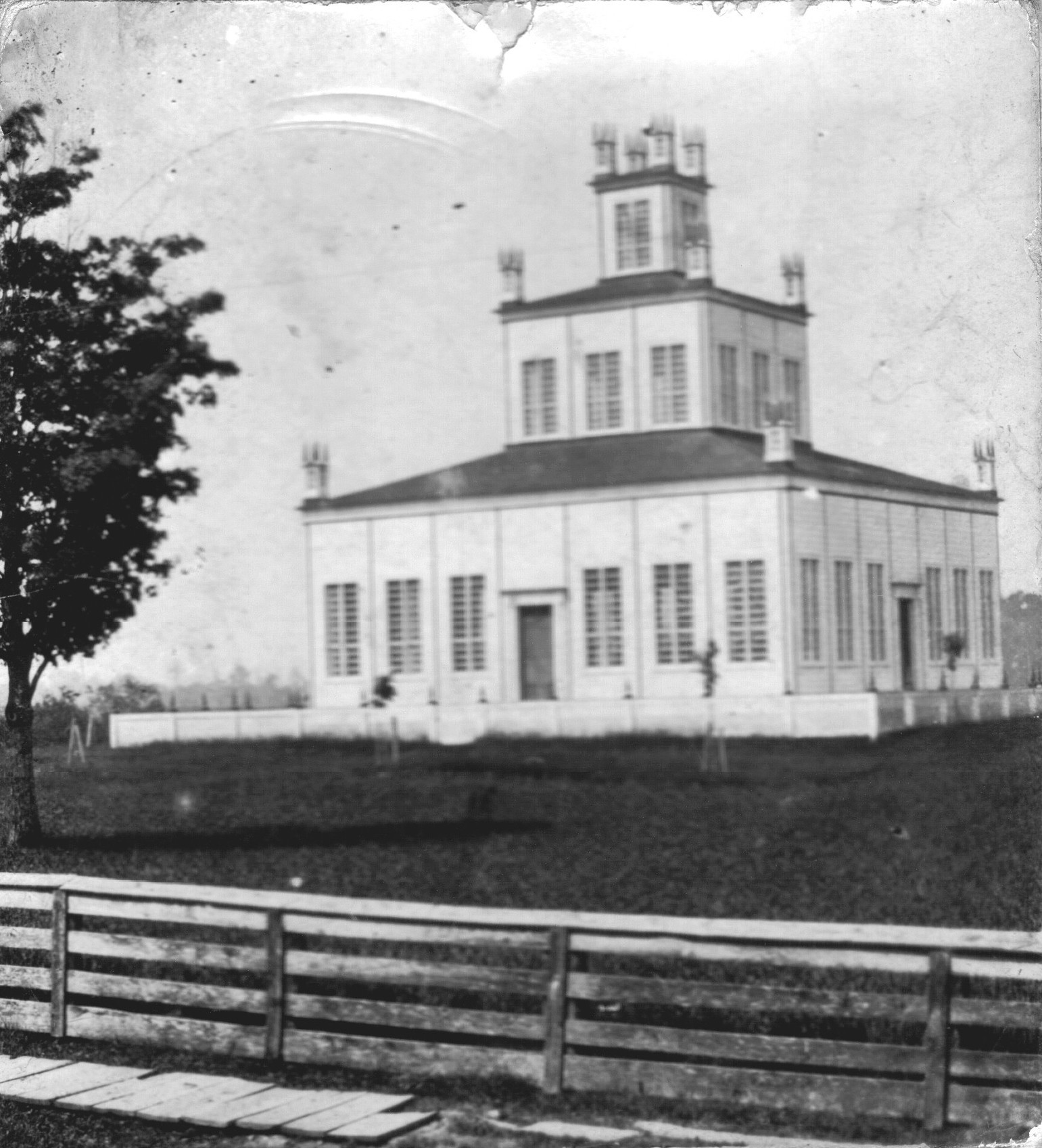
The Sharon Temple, Sharon, Ontario circa 1860.

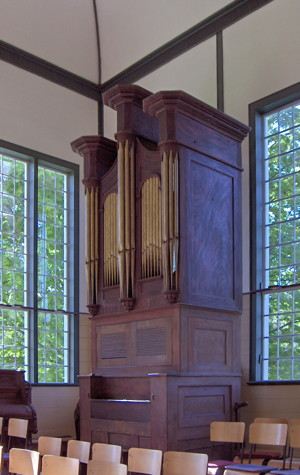
Richard Coates' keyboard organ, Sharon Temple Museum

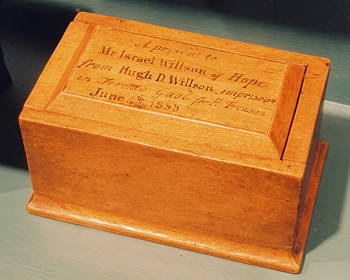
Rebellion box, Sharon Temple Museum

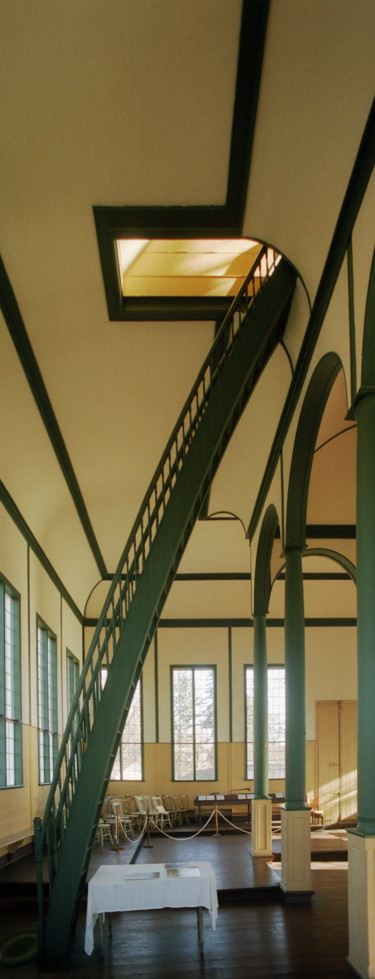
Jacob's Ladder, Sharon Temple
