= Ivaan Kotulsky =

Canadian artist and photographer

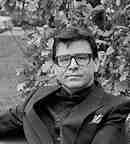
- Ivaan Kotulsky in 1992
- Born: October 9, 1944; Cologne, Germany
- Died: December 6, 2008 (aged 64); Toronto, Ontario, Canada
- Occupations: artist and photographer

Ivaan Kotulsky was an artist and photographer who lived and worked in Toronto, Ontario, Canada. According to an interview with his widow, Eya Donald Greenland Kotulsky, he was born in a Nazi slave labour camp, during World War II. Kotulsky had a distinguished career as a photographer, producing portraits of high-profile individuals, such as Prime Minister Pierre Elliott Trudeau. Kotulsky also documented the lives of street people, and his collection of photos has been donated to the City of Toronto archives, which organized a gallery show, to celebrate their acquisition, and subsequently made them available for download.

Kotulsky was born to Maria and Mykyta Kotulsky while his family was interned in a Nazi slave labour camp near Cologne, Germany, in the final months of World War II, during an Allied bombing raid. In 1949, after having lived for four years as refugees in a Displaced Persons' camp, his family immigrated to Canada, sponsored by a blacksmith in Smoky Lake, Alberta. By 1951, his family had relocated to Toronto's Cabbagetown, near the Don Valley ravine, which provided a slice of nature in downtown Toronto for Ivaan to explore. Kotulsky later credited his exposure to the kindly blacksmith as having kindled his own interest in metalworking which found its outlet in jewellery making, at the age of 25.

Kotulsky was said to have been able to see beauty in things people ordinarily overlook, explaining the quality of the intimate images he took of street people. The engagement ring with which he proposed to his wife featured a very large green stone—which was originally a discarded piece of Seven Up bottle. Never in robust health, Ivaan suffered two heart attacks in the early 1990s. In 1995, Kotulsky opened a retail store on Queen Street West. That year, he and Eya Donald Greenland were married. They had first met in 1969; she was 16 and working after school at the Harbord Bakery, which he frequented. In 2000, Kotulsky experienced the first of a series of strokes that eventually led to his paralysis and affected his ability to create new works of art.

In 2005, after his third stroke, when he lacked the strength and dexterity to continue working independently, Eya started to assist him in his studio, often working with his original moulds, using the lost wax casting technique. She told Nicole Baute, writing in the Toronto Star, that she never intended to continue making pieces from those moulds after he died, beyond filling the outstanding orders, but customers continued to request pieces. The Art Gallery of Ontario, which had commissioned Kotulsky in 1979 to create a collection of jewellery and metal art inspired by King Tutankhamun, hosted a long-running exhibition of King Tutankhamun artefacts in 2009, and requested she produce additional reproductions of his work for display in the AGO Shop. Eya continued to operate his studio, ATELIER IVAAN, to showcase and preserve his artistic legacy until December, 2018.

Baute reported that Kotulsky became the "first Canadian to undergo a pioneering neurosurgical procedure", to close off the damaged artery that had led to his four strokes. She reported that the surgery closed off the artery, but that during surgery, Kotulsky suffered a fifth stroke that left him in a coma from which he never regained consciousness. Ivaan Kotulsky died on December 6, 2008.

In 2017, the City of Toronto named one of its many laneways IVAAN KOTULSKY LANE, in his honour.
