= Tonetta =

Musical artist (born 1949)

- Born: February 17, 1949 (age 77); Cabbagetown, Toronto, Ontario, Canada
- Genres: Pop; lo-fi; outsider
- Occupations: Singer-songwriter; visual artist; upholsterer
- Instruments: Guitar, bass, keyboards, vocals
- Years active: 1983–present
- Website: tonetta777.bandcamp.com

Anthony Jeffrey (born February 17, 1949), also known as Tonetta, is a Canadian musician and visual artist who, in the early 1980s, began living as a recluse and recording original music on cassettes after separating from his wife. In 2008, he started his first YouTube channel, which led to his record label debut. His YouTube account, as well as many subsequent accounts established under other usernames, have been banned repeatedly for violating the site's content rules on nudity and sexual content.

== Life and career ==
Anthony Jeffrey was born on February 17, 1949, in the Cabbagetown neighbourhood of Toronto, Ontario, Canada.

== Style and recognition ==
According to music journalist Liam Finn, "Tonetta" refers more specifically to Jeffrey's "female alter ego." Jeffrey has said that many of his songs are inspired by real life people or incidents, and cited John Lennon as his primary influence. Of his music tastes, he said: "I like the Beatles, Elvis Presley, Michael Jackson. I followed soul artists. ... After [Lennon] died, I didn't know who to follow anymore. It was around then I started writing anyway so it kinda worked out."

Critics have variously described Tonetta as "the savior of lo-fi music", "a pure artist", and a combination of "repulsion and intrigue". In the description of music writer Johnny Dee, "For every YouTube comment that finds Tonetta hilarious or repellent there are dozens from people who have discovered that, beyond the shock value, is [sic] a genuine outsider pop artist." Tonetta is best known for his song "Pressure Zone".

Jeffrey was interviewed on Season 5, Episode 14 of the American television series Tosh.0. South California rock band the Growlers covered Tonetta's song, "Drugs, Drugs, Drugs", during various live performances, notably their 2012 Coachella setlist. In 2019, Canadian rapper Freddie Dredd sampled Tonetta's song "You Make Me Cum" on his single "Weather".

== Personal life ==
As of 2011, Jeffrey lived in Toronto, Ontario, as a part-time upholsterer. He was previously married to a woman until 1983, and has two sons. He has not talked to his wife or seen his children since 1983, when his sons were eight and 10 years old. One of his sons reconnected with him by email shortly after Jeffrey began posting music to YouTube in 2008, but stopped writing once Tonetta began "puttin’ on the dresses and stuff."

== Discography ==
=== Studio albums ===
- 777 (2010)
- 777 Vol II (2010)
- 777 Vol III (2011)
- Red Wine (2013)
- Tonetta (2019)
- Christmas Album (2019)

=== Singles ===
- "Get It Going" b/w "Mmm Mama!" (2010)
