= York Pioneers =

York Pioneer and Historical Society
- Formation: 1869
- Type: Historical society
- Purpose: "Preserving the past for the future"
- Location: Toronto, Ontario, Canada
- Services: Operates Scadding Cabin, publishes York Pioneer journal, maintains private archives
- Website: www.yorkpioneers.com

The York Pioneer and Historical Society (YPHS) is Ontario's oldest historical society, and the second-oldest historical society in Canada. It is located in Toronto and operates Scadding Cabin during the Canadian National Exhibition, publishes the York Pioneer journal, and participates in Toronto historical preservation projects.

== History ==
The York Pioneers were formed in 1869 in an attempt to preserve the heritage of York (now Toronto). The York Pioneer and Historical Society began on April 17, 1869, with the purpose of preserving the history of the Home District. A few months later, the York Pioneers Association was founded to collect and preserve historical information and sites. Colonel Richard Lippincott Denison was the first president.

In 1879, John Smith, the owner of the Scadding property, donated Scadding Cabin to the York Pioneers. That year was also the beginning of the Toronto Industrial Exhibition, later the CNE, and the York Pioneers worked with the CNE's founders to dismantle and move the cabin to its current site in order to celebrate the fair's inauguration.

== Historic contributions ==
=== Tecumseh ===
Following the death of Tecumseh in 1813, there was an effort to find his final resting place, but because he was buried quickly, the site was unknown. York Pioneer Richard Oates, in an attempt to bury Tecumseh's bones beside Sir Isaac Brock's at Queenston Heights, set out to find the lost burial site. Using a map in an old journal, a burial site was discovered matching Tecumseh's burial site's description at the north-east corner of the Battle of the Thames battle site. The site was confirmed by a scalping knife and gun mechanism discovered in the burial site, in addition to a fracture on one of the leg bones, agreeing with an observation made that Tecumseh was "a little lame in the right leg."

The discovered bones looked promising, but the party delayed full excavation for experts to arrive. The experts came and said the bones were a jumble of bones from different bodies and species, creating suspicion that perhaps what had been found originally had been stolen away and replaced with trash. Despite Tecumseh being interred on Walpole Island, the mystery of Tecumseh's final resting place technically remains unsolved.

Ultimately, the Tecumseh Monument Committee failed to attract the necessary capital to erect a monument at Queenston Heights. The cost of the monument is unknown, but the committee appeared to have desired something similar to the monument planned for Sir Isaac Brock, which cost £12,000.

=== Sharon Temple ===
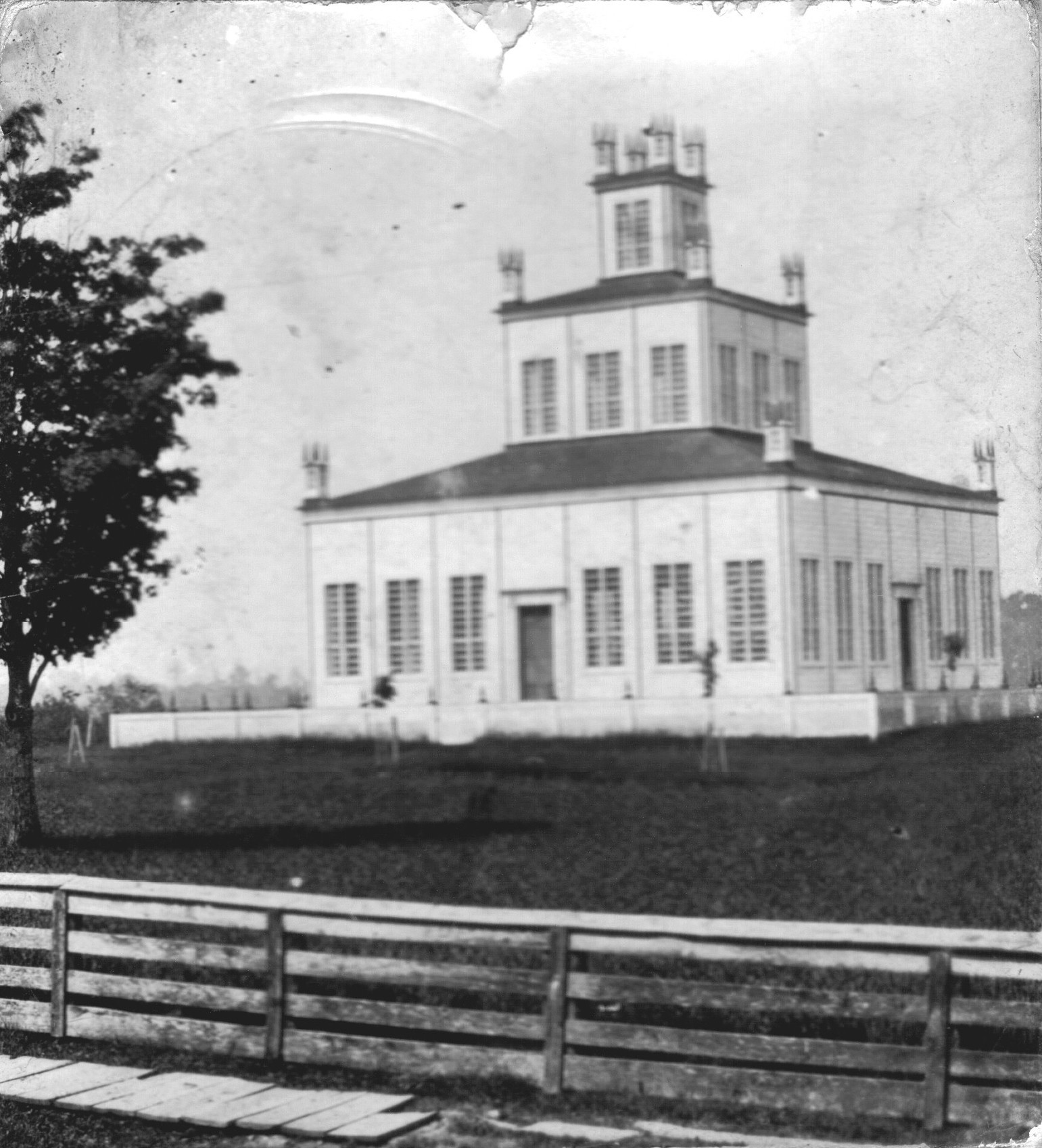
Sharon Temple National Historic Site

Sharon Temple was opened in 1832 by David Willson, who after a disagreement with the Quakers, founded a sect of his own known as the Children of Peace. Under the impetus of the Rev. James L. Hughes, the York Pioneer and Historical Society raised funds to purchase the Sharon Temple and its grounds in 1917 and opened the Temple as a museum in 1918. In addition to acquiring the temple, the York Pioneers also acquired relics, including an organ, said to be the first organ built in Canada, a book containing David Willson's original entries, the Statues of His Majesty's Province of Upper Canada, printed in 1792, and a "tattered" almanac of 1813, printed by John Cameron of York.

Shortly afterwards, the York Pioneers moved David Willson's study to the site. This is significant as one of the earliest examples of historic preservation in Canada, one of the reasons for which the Temple received its National Historic Designation in 1993. The York Pioneers collected artifacts from throughout York County and created a county museum and park, which they displayed in the Temple. A baseball diamond, recreation area and refreshment stand were added on the surrounding grounds. In the 1950s, the site's focus began to change, emphasizing the story of the Children of Peace. The York Pioneers restored and moved the 1819 home of Ebenezer Doan, master builder of the Temple, and a log house associated with Jesse Doan, bandmaster of the Children of Peace, to the site. These acquisitions were followed in 1967, Canada's centennial year, by the construction of an exhibit building. The baseball diamond and other remnants of the park's early days were removed. Lastly, they moved the Cookhouse, and the Gatehouse, to the Temple grounds.

In 1991, the museum was transferred to the newly formed Sharon Temple Museum Society, with a member of the York Pioneer and Historical Society serving on the Board of the Museum Society.

=== Scadding Cabin ===
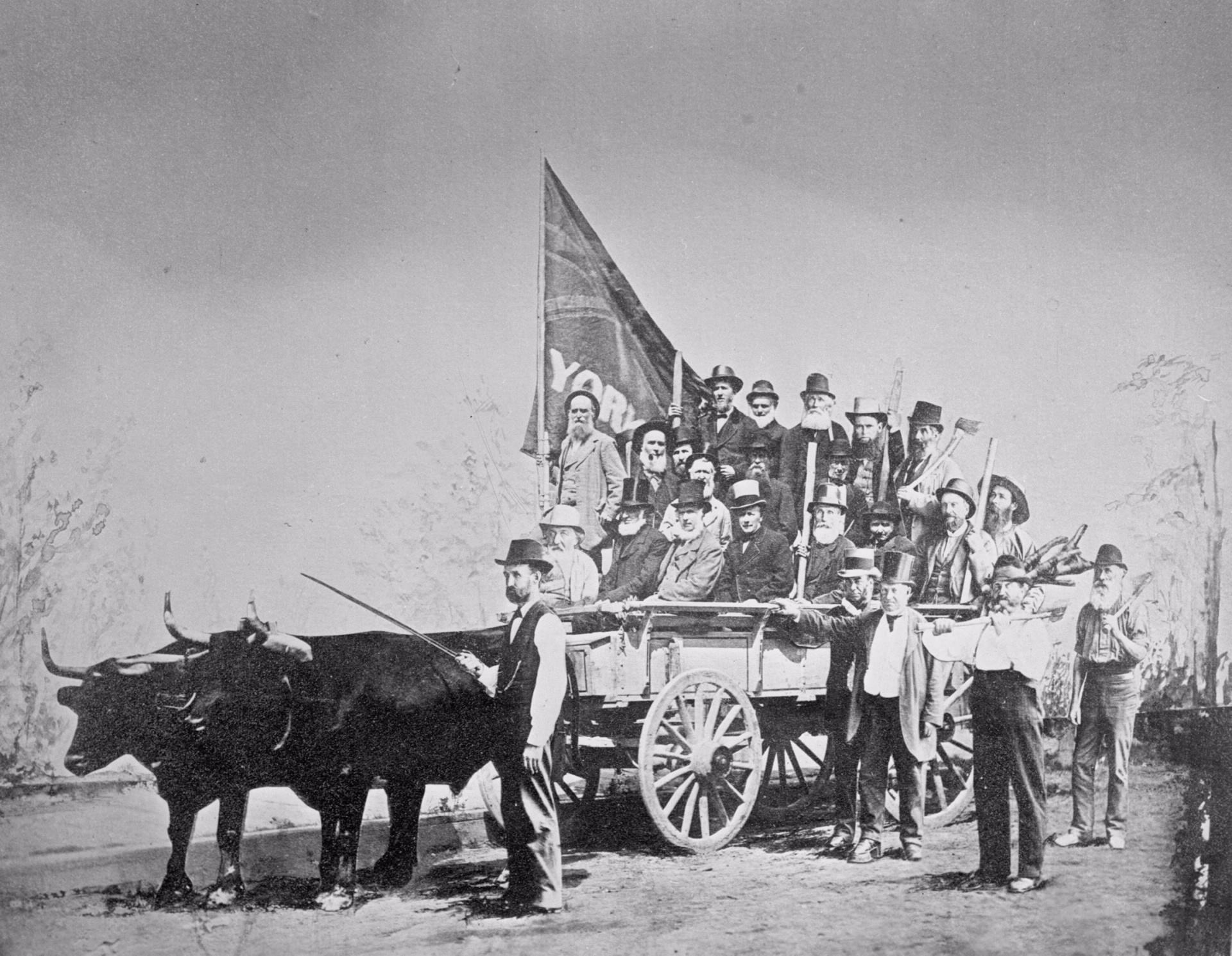
On the way to the CNE

In 1879, John Smith, the owner of the Scadding property, gave Scadding Cabin to the York Pioneers. 1879 was also the beginning of the Toronto Industrial Exhibition, later the CNE, and the York Pioneers worked with the CNE's founders to dismantle and move the cabin to its current site at Exhibition Place to celebrate the fair's inauguration that August. The York Pioneers dismantled the cabin, moved it and re-assembled it using the tools and techniques of the past. The rebuilding of the cabin captured headlines, featuring news of the cabin being re-built. Some York Pioneers met at a seed store on Adelaide Street prior to the rebuilding, where they all gathered on a wagon and headed down King Street, flying a 'York Pioneers' flag. The rebuilding began and lasted from the early morning of August 22, 1879 until 5 pm that evening. Upon its completion, a cannon was fired, and a bottle was broken over the re-constructed 'Simcoe Cabin'.

Originally named Simcoe Cabin, the cabin was renamed Scadding Cabin in 1901 to honour Henry Scadding, Toronto's first eminent historian and son of the cabin's original owner, who was a founding member and president of the York Pioneers. The preservation of Scadding Cabin is considered Toronto's earliest example of historic preservation and one of Canada's oldest examples.

=== Eversley Church ===
Eversley Church in King City was built in 1848 and known as the Scotch Church. The church served the religious needs of the community for 110 years, and it was representative of the Scottish influence of the area and the common use of fieldstone as building material. The church was closed in 1958, when the congregation merged with St. Andrew's Presbyterian. To prevent the building's demolition, Lady Eaton bought it in 1968 and donated it to the York Pioneers. The Eversley Church became an all-denominational church that was used by the society for various events and in 1984 was designated as a heritage site by the township of King.

Extensive stonework and structural repairs were completed on the building in 2008. However, in the face of additional repair work needed, the York Pioneers sold the church in June 2012.

=== Archives ===
The YPHS archives consists of the Society's papers and records, historic artifacts and photographs, a set of the Annual Reports dating from 1906 to the present, recorded oral histories, and a collection of over 150 books and pamphlets relating to the history of Toronto and York County. The Society occasionally lends items to support local historic exhibits. Some items in the collection include the crib made for the first registered birth in the Town of York, a chair and table used by John Graves Simcoe, and a bell used by Alexander Muir when he was a school principal.
