= Henry Scadding =

The Reverend Henry Scadding
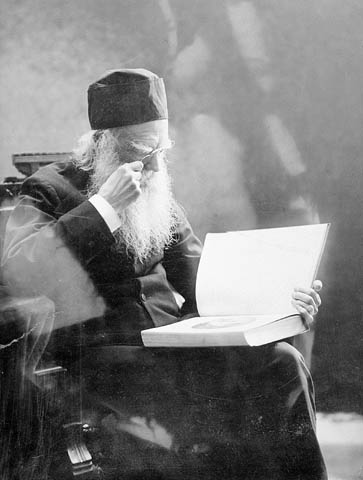
- Scadding in 1897
- Born: July 29, 1813; Dunkeswell, Devon, England
- Died: May 6, 1901 (aged 87); Toronto, Ontario, Canada
- Occupations: Anglican clergyman and writer
- Father: John Scadding

Henry Scadding (July 29, 1813 – May 6, 1901) was a Canadian writer and Anglican clergyman.

== Life and career ==
Scadding was born at Dunkeswell in Devon, England, and he immigrated to York, Upper Canada (now Toronto, Ontario) in 1821 with his parents, John Scadding and Melicent Triggs. He was educated at Upper Canada College and then attended St. John's College at Cambridge University in Cambridge, England, from which he graduated in 1837.

Scadding was the first boy enrolled at Upper Canada College and now has a Day Boy House named after him there, called Scadding's. In 1838, he was appointed to a tutorship at Upper Canada College and was ordained a priest of the Church of England. On August 14, 1841, he married Harriet Eugenia Baldwin (d. 1843) and they had one daughter, Henrietta Millicent Scadding (June 1, 1842 – 1926).

In 1847, Scadding became the rector of the Church of the Holy Trinity in Toronto, a post he held until 1875. He was also a canon of St. James' Cathedral in Toronto.

Scadding wrote many books, including the Memorial of the Reverend William Honywood Riply (1849), Shakespeare the Seer—the Interpreter (1864), Truth's Resurrection (1865), Christian Pantheism (1865), Toronto of Old (1873), The Four Decades of York, Upper Canada (1884) and A History of the Old French Fort at Toronto (1887). In his writings, Scadding was principally interested in history and religious themes.

He also edited the Canadian Journal of Science, Literature, and History from 1868 to 1878. Scadding was a co-founder and the first president of the York Pioneers, a Toronto-based historical society that preserved Scadding Cabin, which had been built by his father in the early days of the town of York.

== Works ==
Building	Year Completed	Builder	Style	Source	Location	Image
Henry Scadding House	1862	Henry Scadding			6 Trinity Square, Toronto	

== See also ==
- List of oldest buildings and structures in Toronto
