= Cabbagetown, Toronto =

Cabbagetown
- Neighbourhood
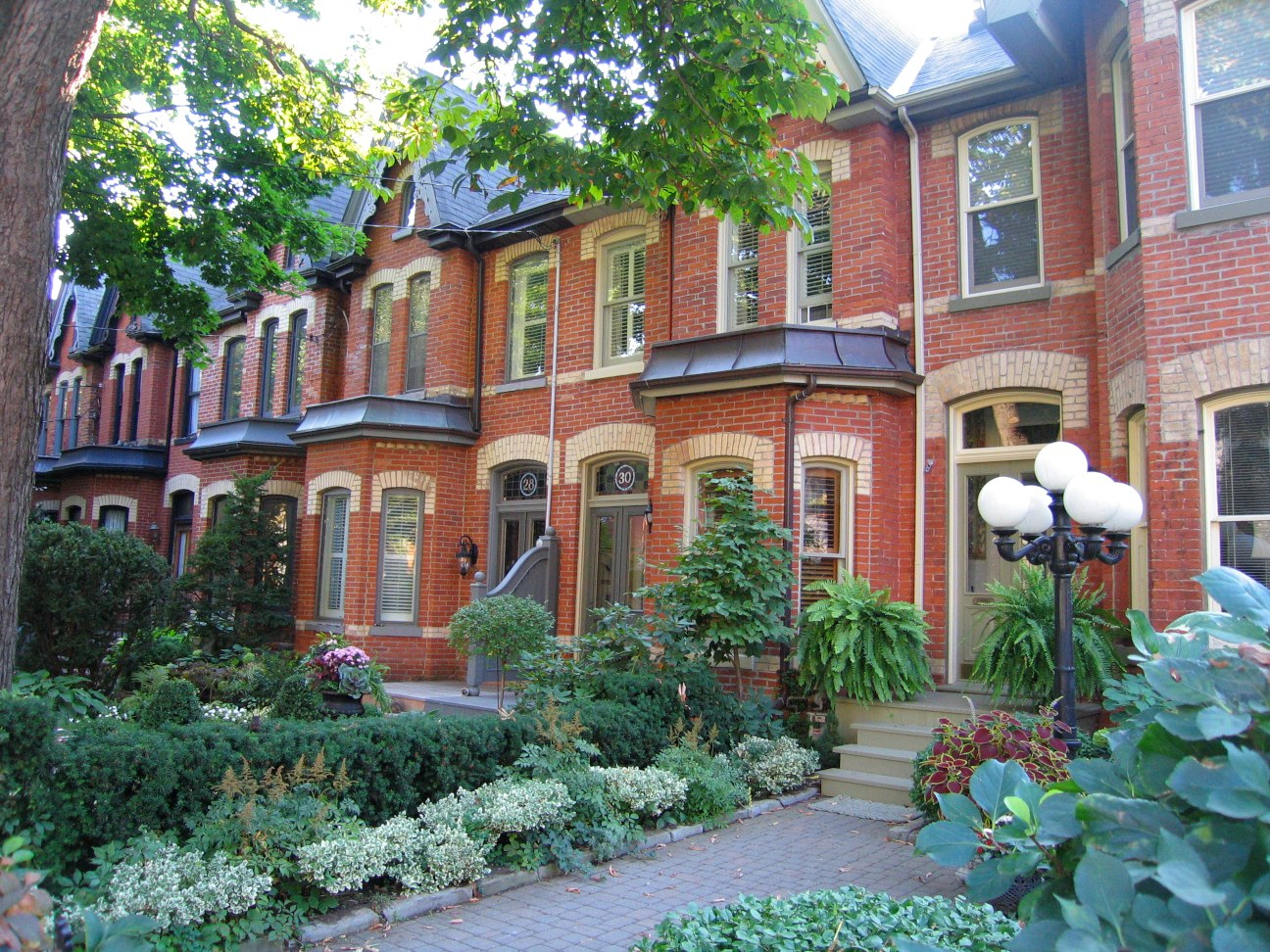

- Location within Toronto
- Coordinates: 43.6664°N 79.3629°W
- Country: Canada
- Province: Ontario
- City: Toronto

Government
  - Type: Ward 13 of Toronto City Council
  - City councillor: Chris Moise

Cabbagetown is a neighbourhood in downtown Toronto, Ontario, Canada. Administratively, it is defined as part of the Cabbagetown-South St. James Town neighbourhood. It largely features semi-detached Victorian houses and is recognized as "the largest continuous area of preserved Victorian housing in all of North America", according to the Cabbagetown Preservation Association.

Cabbagetown's name derives from the Irish immigrants who moved to the neighbourhood beginning in the late 1840s, said to have been so poor that they grew cabbage in their front yards. Canadian writer Hugh Garner's novel, Cabbagetown, depicted life in the neighbourhood during the Great Depression.

== History ==
The area today known as Cabbagetown was first known as the village of Don Vale, just outside Toronto. Before the 1850s, it consisted of farmland dotted with cottages and vegetable plots. It grew up in the 1840s around the Winchester Street Bridge, which before the construction of the Prince Edward Viaduct was the main northern bridge over the Don River. This was near the site where Castle Frank Brook flowed in the Don River. By the bridge the Don Vale Tavern and Fox's Inn were established to cater to travellers. In 1850 the Toronto Necropolis was established in the area as the city's main cemetery. In 1872 the Necropolis Chapel was built.

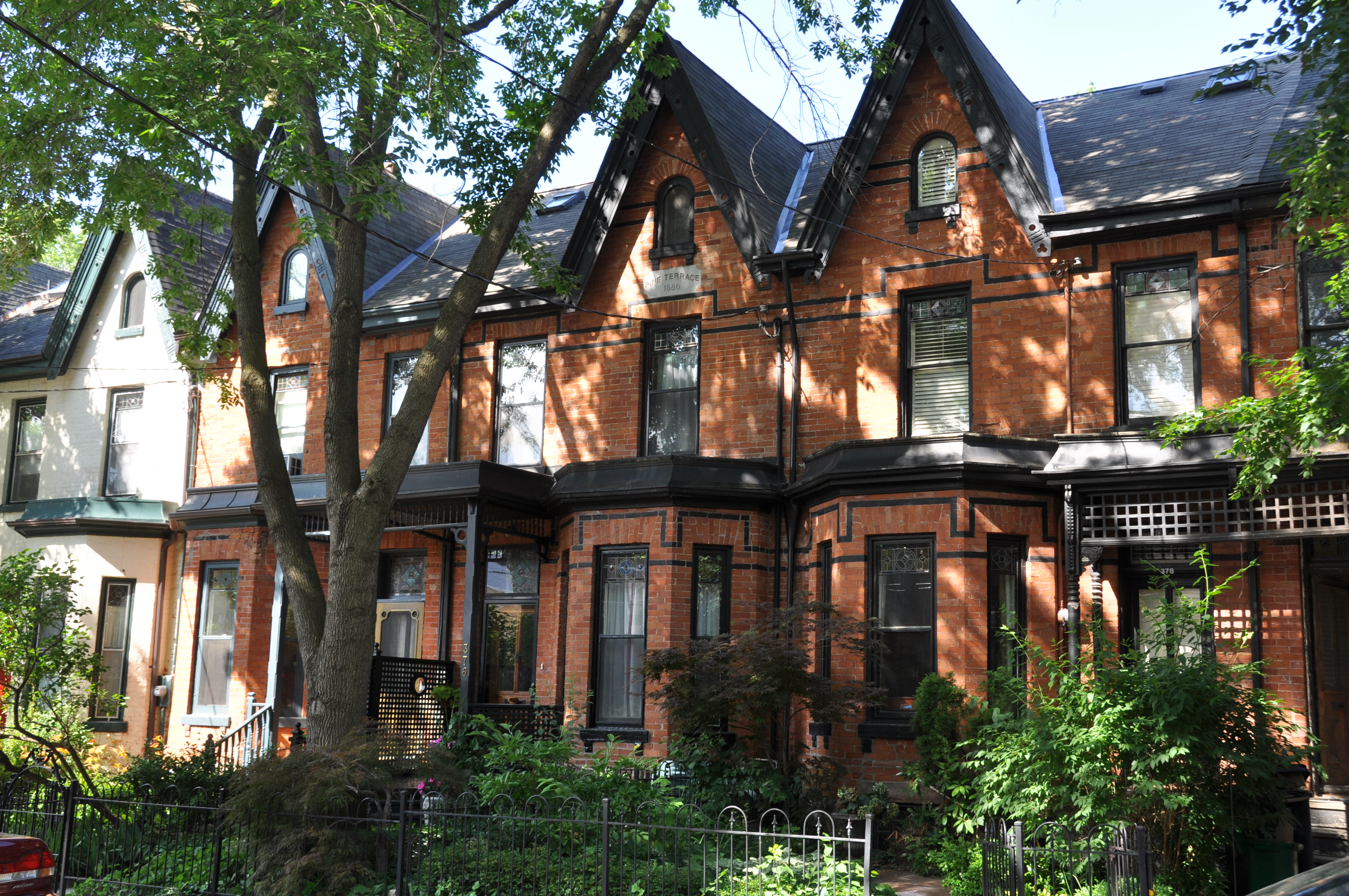
Brick Victorian styled homes were built throughout Cabbagetown in the late 19th and early 20th century.

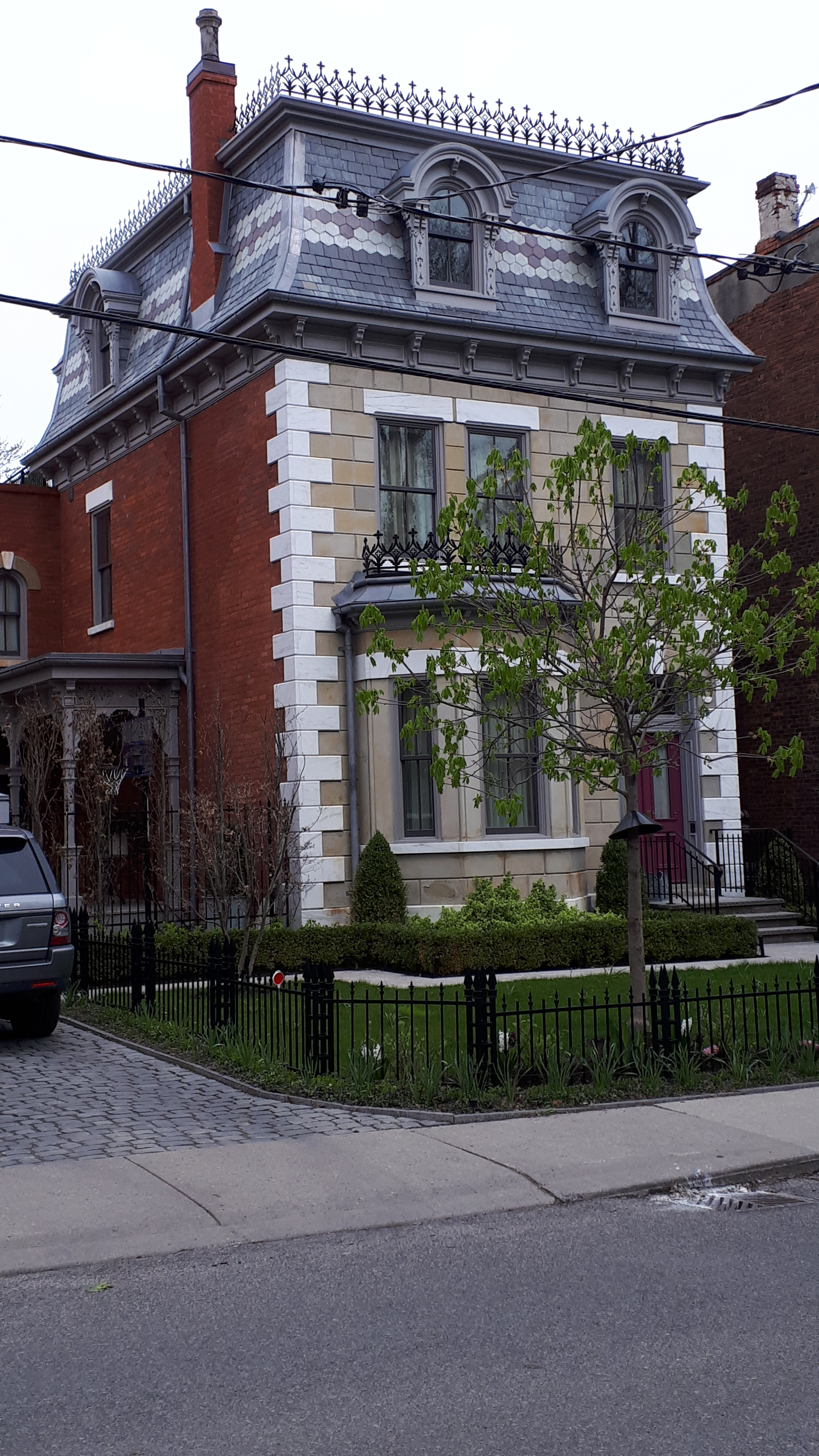
Francis Shields House built in 1877 by Bruce and Hagon Inc.

In the late 19th century, the area was absorbed into the city. It became home to the working class Irish inhabitants who were employed in the industries along the lake shore to the south in Corktown. Brick Victorian-style houses were built throughout the area. The name Cabbagetown purportedly came from stories of new Macedonian and Irish immigrants digging up their front lawns and planting cabbage. During this period, the name Cabbagetown most often applied to the area south of Gerrard Street, with the part to the north still being called Don Vale. It was a working-class neighbourhood, with approximately 50% of the residents renting houses. It reached its peak of prosperity just before World War I, which is from when many of the brick homes in the area date. The various architectural styles visible in the neighborhood range from Second-Empire to Bay-n-Gable and High Victorian Terraces, with excellent examples being Francis Shields' House at 377 Sackville St.

Following events of the war, the area became increasingly impoverished. A large number of poorer residents moved in, many resorting to share one house among multiple families. The nineteenth-century brick houses began deteriorating and, as landlords saw less value in the neighbourhood, they were not maintained. It became known as one of Toronto's largest slums and much of the original Cabbagetown was razed in the late 1940s to make room for the Regent Park housing project. A new immigrant influx also led to the beginning of ethnic diversity in the neighbourhood. The remaining section to the north, then still known as Don Vale, was also slated to be cleared and replaced by housing projects. In 1964 a Toronto Star writer wrote that "Cabbagetown has become a downhill ride and if you're on way up, you don't dare stay there for long unless you live in Regent Park."

The construction of new housing projects was then halted in the 1970s. In Don Mount this effort was led by Karl Jaffary, who was elected to city council in the 1969 municipal election along with a group of like-minded councillors who opposed sweeping urban renewal plans. John Sewell led the effort to preserve Trefann Court, which covered the southern section of the original Cabbagetown. A bylaw was later approved in the 1970s to ban any building higher than four storeys, in response to the high density high-rises being built in neighbouring St. James Town.

== Festivals and Fairs ==
Cabbagetown hosts a number of annual festivals and fairs.

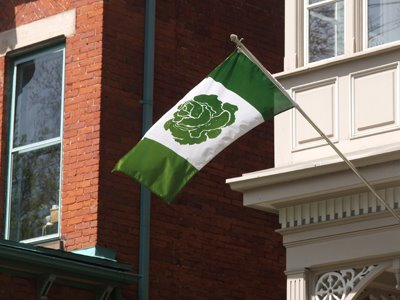
Cabbagetown flag in the community.

The Cabbagetown Festival takes place every year in September at Carlton and Parliament Street to celebrate local businesses and the community. The Canadian Contemporary Dance Theatre (CCDT), a local dance theatre, does a public street performance at the festival every year, and vendors set up food, drinks and crafted products.

The Forsythia Festival takes place on the first Sunday in May at Wellesley Park and includes a parade, food and drink from local vendors and activities for kids.

== Gentrification ==
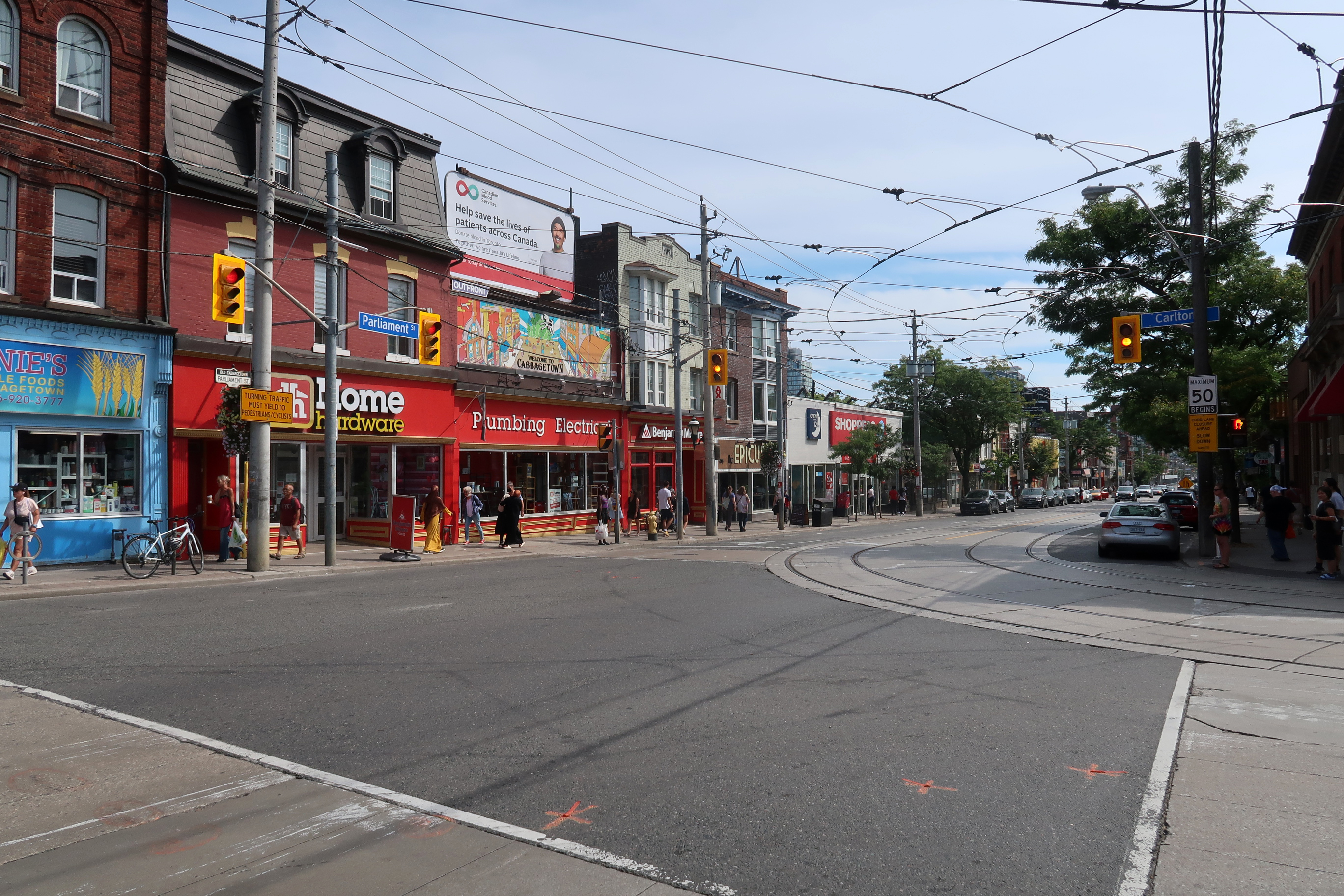
Businesses along Parliament Street

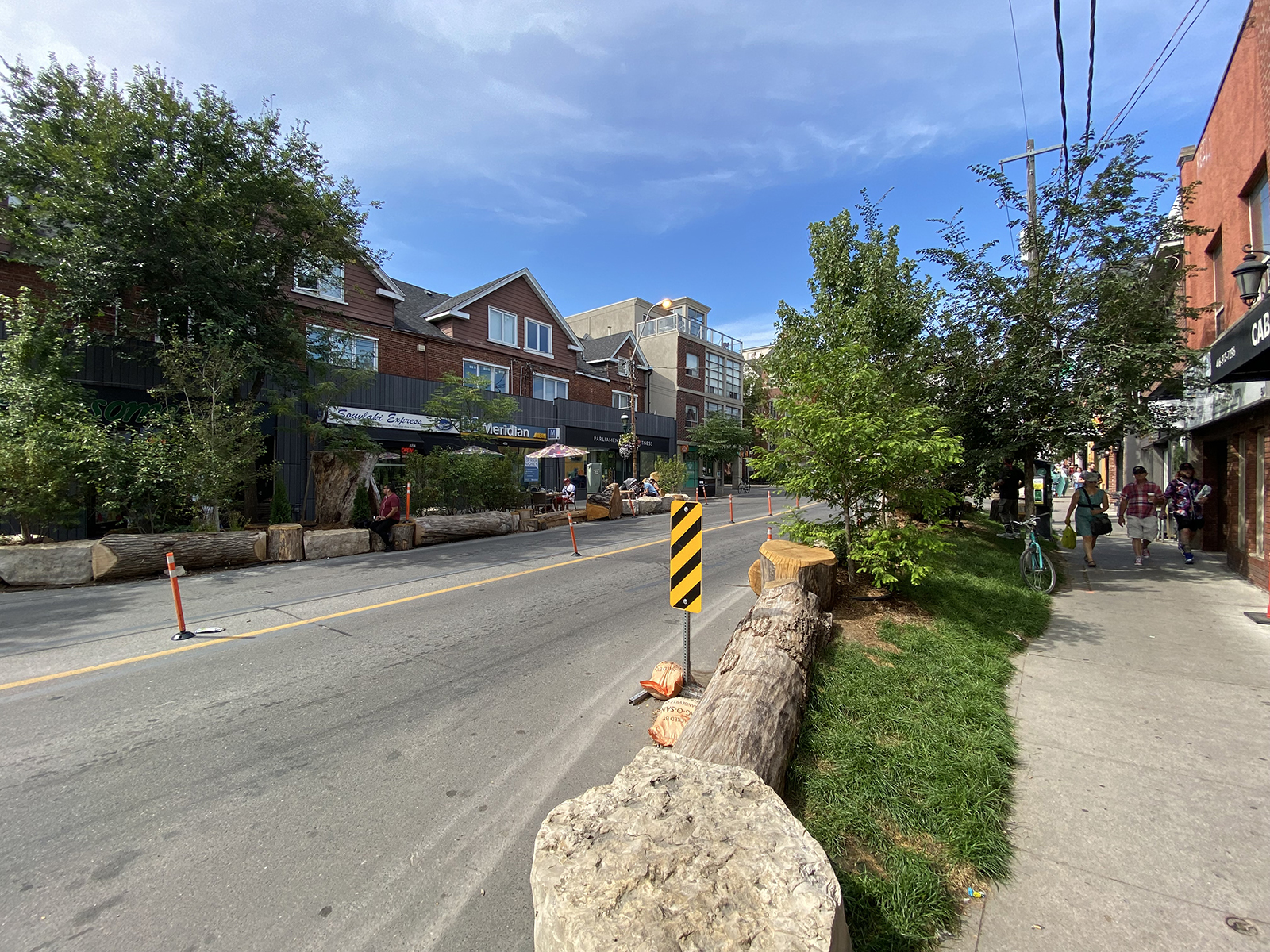
Parliament Street Parkscape project in Summer, 2022

Cabbagetown was heavily gentrified by affluent professionals, beginning in the 1970s. Many residents restored small Victorian row houses and became community activists. Darrell Kent, a resident and local businessman, is recognized by the community as having been the driving force behind the restoration of many of the area’s beautiful and unique Victorian houses. As Kent was a gay real estate agent, gay men and some lesbians made up the earliest gentrifying groups of Cabbagetown. They are still a significant part of the population today, and the area is considered queer-friendly.

In 1983 the Globe and Mail wrote,

Cabbagetown is probably the epitome of successful labelling. The core of the area—generally defined as being bounded by Parliament, Wellesley and Dundas Streets and the Don Valley—was once Toronto's skid row. Today, about a decade after the area was invaded by young professionals, speculators and real estate agents, there are still a few derelicts around to give the area colour. The houses, meanwhile, sell for upward of $200,000.

Thirty-five years after that article was written, most homes in the area sell for well over $1 million.

Vestiges of a 1960s, counter-culture ambiance remain at vintage clothing stores, health food stores and a gestalt therapy clinic. A Victorian farm, once the site of a zoo, is located adjacent to Riverdale Park West, where a weekly farmer's market is held. A short distance away is the Cabbagetown Youth Centre, home of the Cabbagetown Boxing Club, a reminder of an earlier, and rougher, past. In recent years, some businesses from the nearby "gay village" of Church and Wellesley, have relocated to the area, attracted by cheaper commercial rents.

Despite gentrification, residents from public housing projects and affluent home owners mingle at a discount supermarket and a community medical clinic. Panhandling and drug-dealing are part of the urban landscape; so are gourmet shops, upscale boutiques and arts festivals, book launches and wine-tastings at local restaurants. Paradoxically,

The Gerrard and Parliament neighbourhood, located near Dundas and Sherbourne Streets, has the largest concentration of homeless shelters and drop-in centres in Canada. The area is also distinguished by a large number of rooming houses and other forms of low-income housing.

== Notable people ==
- Brent Butt — comedian
- Tarek Fatah — journalist
- Larry Gains — boxer
- Ivaan Kotulsky — artist and photographer
- Phyllis Grosskurth - Academic, Critic and Biographer
- Avril Lavigne — Canadian singer, songwriter and actress
- Amy Millan — indie folk/rock singer and guitarist
- Robbie Robertson — musician, songwriter, film composer, producer, actor, and author
- Tonetta — singer-songwriter and visual artist, born in Cabbagetown
- Kenny Hotz & Spencer Rice — filmed multiple seasons of Kenny vs Spenny in a house located in Cabbagetown
- Noah Richler — author/political candidate and commentator.

As part of a project called "Cabbagetown People," historical plaques have been placed on noteworthy homes. A map of the locations has been erected in Riverdale Park West, and an index of the addresses, with the names of the former residents, is posted on a website devoted to this project. The people listed include:

- Hugh Garner
- Ernest MacMillan
- Betty Oliphant
- Al Purdy
- Gordon Sinclair
- Ernest Thompson Seton
- Thomas P. Kelley — author of The Black Donnellys

== See also ==
- List of annual events in Toronto
- List of neighbourhoods in Toronto
- List of parks in Toronto
