= Scadding Cabin =

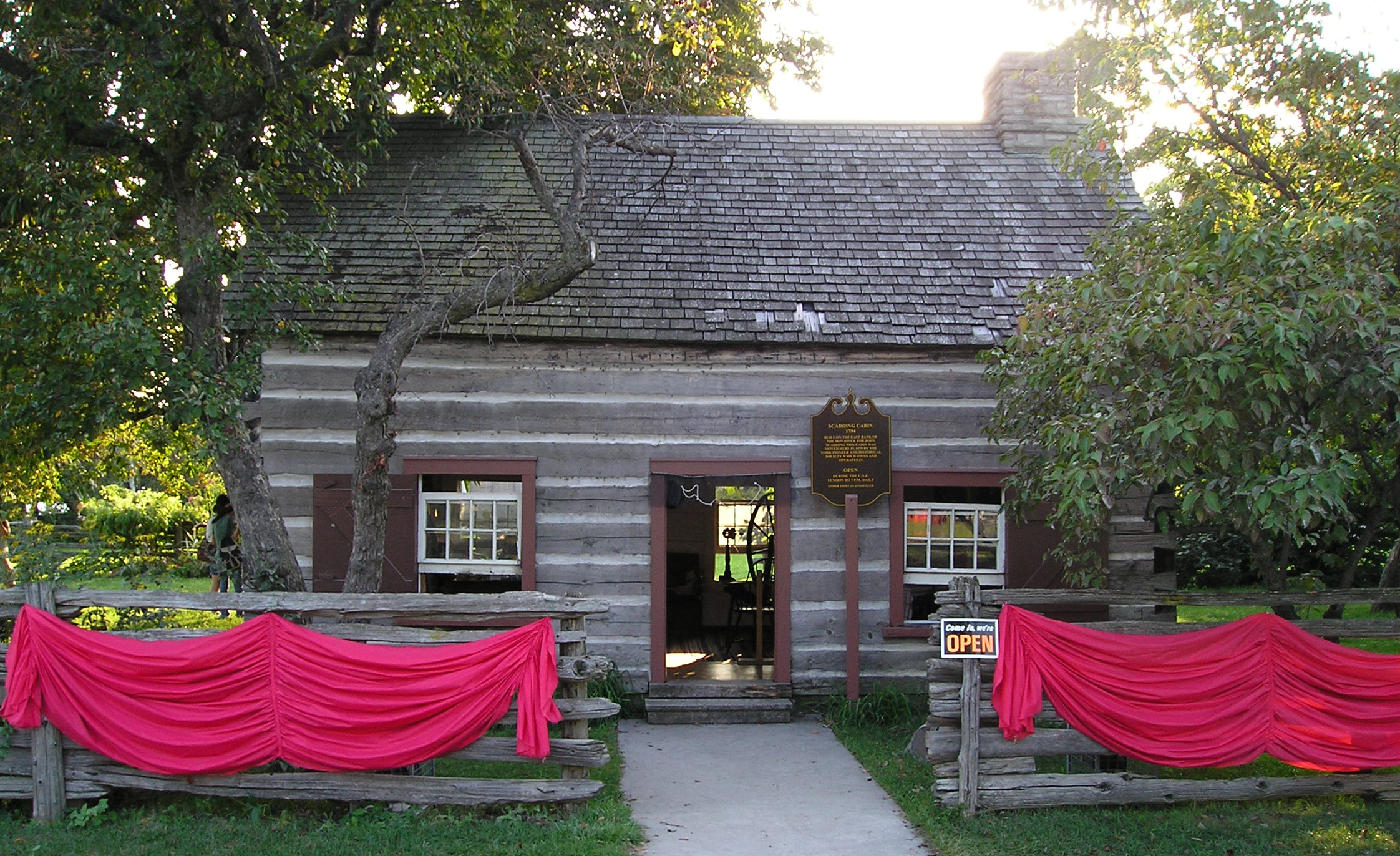
- Entrance to Scadding Cabin

- Cabin location
- 43°37′50.55″N 79°25′26.37″W
- Location: Alberta Circle, Toronto, Ontario, Canada

History
- Built: 1794

Site notes
- Current use: Museum
- Governing body: York Pioneers
- Website: York Pioneers

Scadding Cabin (or Simcoe Cabin) is a 1794 log cabin on the grounds of Exhibition Place in Toronto, Ontario, Canada. It was constructed for John Scadding and is now the oldest surviving building in Toronto.

== History ==
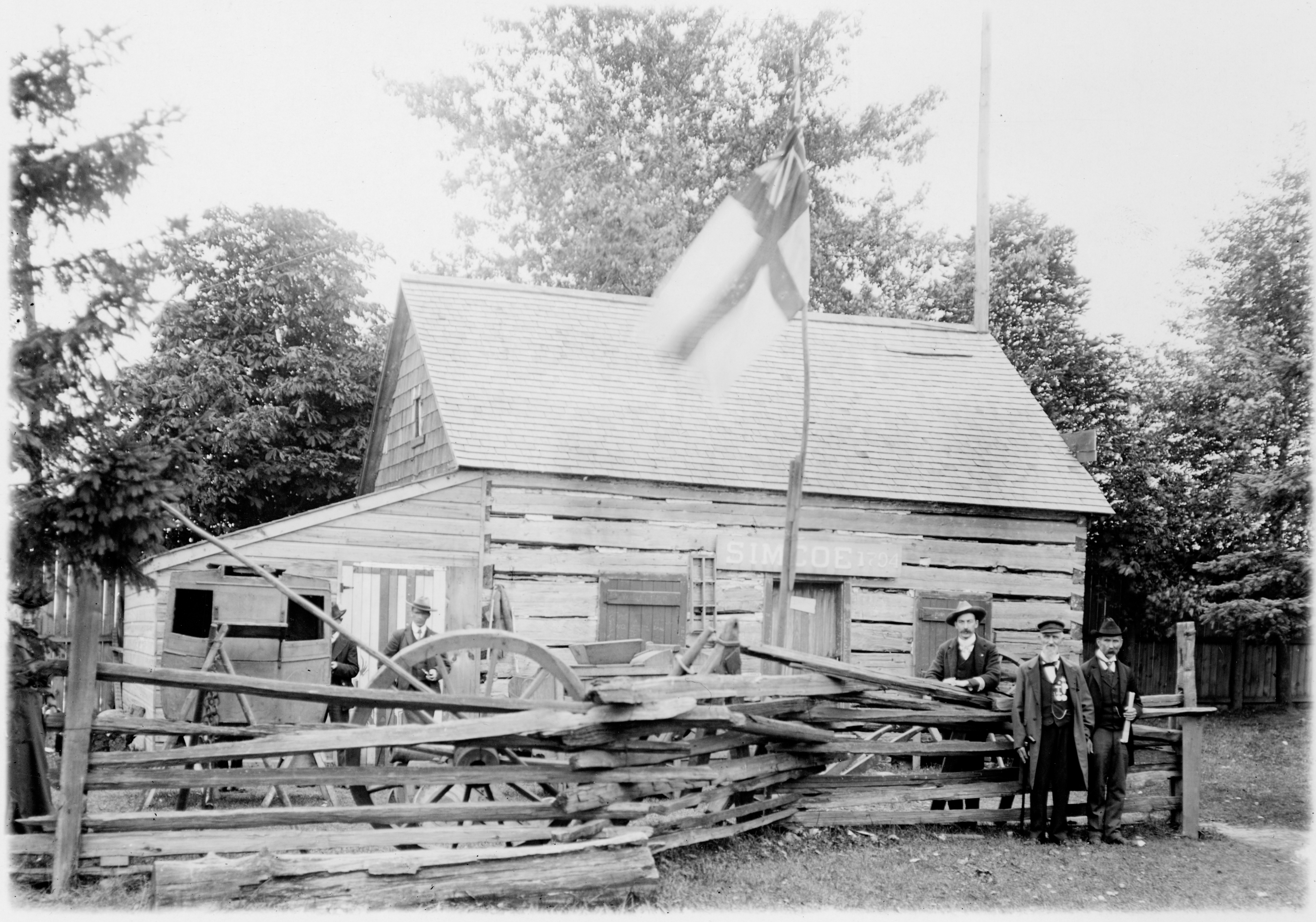
Canadian National Exhibition grounds: Scadding Cabin, 1903, which was moved to this site by York Pioneer and Historical Society, 1903

The cabin was originally built on the property of John Scadding, an immigrant from Devonshire, in order to fulfill his settlement duties to the Crown. The cabin stood at the east side of the Don River south of Queen Street East on a 253-acre land grant that stretched north from Lake Ontario to present-day Danforth Avenue. Scadding lived in the cabin until he returned to England in 1796.

When Scadding returned to York in 1818, he sold his property, and cabin, to a farmer named William Smith, who used the cabin as an outbuilding. The cabin remained in the Smith family until 1879 when the cabin was offered to the York Pioneers. Henry Scadding, son of John Scadding, was a founding member of the historical society.

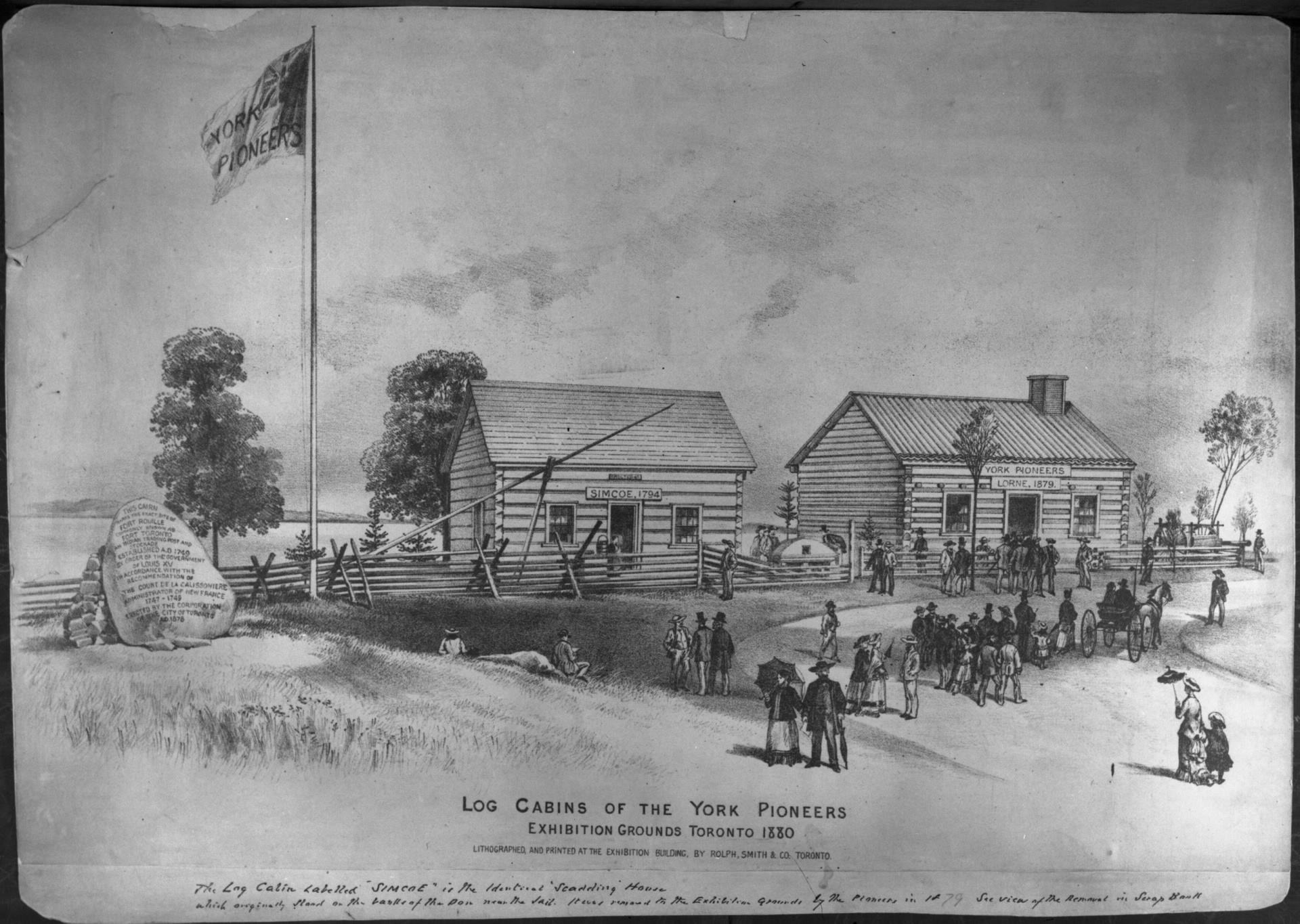
Scadding Cabin at its new location in Exhibition Place, June 1880.

In 1879 John Smith, the owner of the Scadding property, gave Scadding Cabin to the York Pioneers. In 1879, the Toronto Industrial Exhibition began (later the Canadian National Exhibition (CNE) ) and the York Pioneers worked with the Exhibition's founders to move the Cabin to its current site to celebrate the Fair's inauguration. The cabin was dismantled, moved and reconstructed by the York Pioneers on the grounds of the first Industrial Exhibition (now Exhibition Place) on August 22, 1879 near the site of Fort Rouillé.

=== Current use ===
The York Pioneers currently operate Scadding Cabin as a museum. The Scadding Cabin is furnished as a pioneer home from the 1830s to early 1840s, although there are artifacts that date back to the 1790s. The oldest item is a baby's cradle, made by Scadding. Furnishings include two spinning wheels and a wool winder, equipment for making bread and butter, a candle mould, and utensils for cooking on an open hearth.

Scadding Cabin is open during the CNE, held each year from mid-August to the end of the Canadian Labour Day weekend. The cabin is also open through special arrangements and for community events during the summer months such as Toronto's Doors Open. In the past, the cabin has been open during the Luminato Festival and annual CHIN picnic when these events are held at Exhibition Place.

In 2022, rot was found in one of the main log timbers. The York Pioneers raised funds and made repairs to the Cabin in 2023.

== See also ==
- List of oldest buildings and structures in Toronto
- Fort Rouillé
