= John Scadding =

Settler in York

- Born: 1754
- Died: March 1, 1824 (aged 69–70)
- Known for: Clerk to John Graves Simcoe; resident of the Scadding Cabin
- Children: Henry Scadding

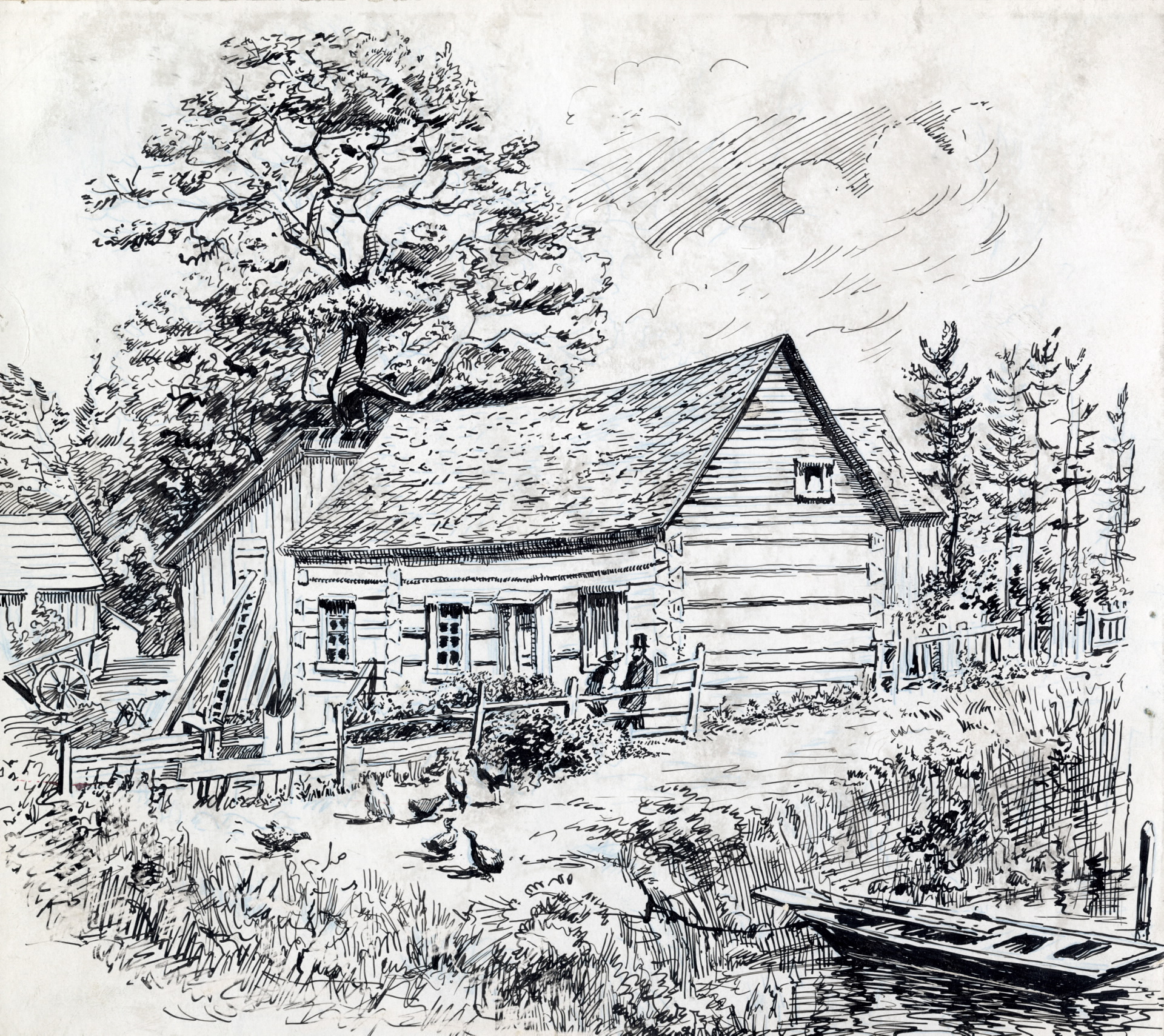
Illustration of the Scadding Cabin

John Scadding (1754 – March 1, 1824) was an early settler in York, Upper Canada (now Toronto, Ontario, Canada). He is remembered for constructing the Scadding Cabin, which is now the oldest surviving building in Toronto. He served as a clerk to John Graves Simcoe, the first Lieutenant Governor of Upper Canada.

== Life and career ==
Scadding arrived in Upper Canada from England in 1791, along with Simcoe, and he was granted a lot on the east side of the Don River in 1793. He built a log cabin (now known as the Scadding Cabin) in 1794, in order to fulfill his settlement duties to the Crown. In 1796, Scadding left York for England with Simcoe and did not return until 1818.

While in England, Scadding managed Simcoe's estate. Around 1806, Scadding married Melicent Triggs (1768 – February 26, 1860), and they had three sons – John Scadding (March 5, 1807 – June 18, 1845), Charles Scadding (October 10, 1809 – June 19, 1892) and Henry Scadding (July 29, 1813 – May 6, 1901). His son Henry became a prominent figure in Toronto and a well-known historiographer of York and early Toronto. Simcoe died in 1806, and Scadding continued to manage the estate for a few years afterwards, during which time his sons were born.

Scadding returned to York in 1818. He built a larger log house and numerous other buildings farther north on his property (near what is now Broadview and Gerrard), including a large barn. He sold the southern portion of the lot and the original log cabin to William Smith. The rest of the Scadding family followed in 1821. Scadding died on March 1, 1824, after a large tree fell on him while it was being cut down.

The remaining portion of Scadding's original land grant, located north of Gerrard, was purchased by the City of Toronto in 1856, and the later buildings were demolished for the Industrial Farm and subsequently the Don Jail. The original log cabin was dismantled in 1879 by the York Pioneers and re-erected on the grounds of Exhibition Place, where it still stands.
