= Connell James Baldwin =

Irish soldier and civil servant

- Born: 1777
- Died: 14 December, 1861 (aged 83–84)
- Military career
- Allegiance: United Kingdom
- Branch: British Army
- Commands: 87th (Royal Irish Fusiliers) Regiment of Foot; 83rd (County of Dublin) Regiment of Foot; 50th (Queen's Own) Regiment of Foot
- Conflicts: Napoleonic Wars

Connell James Baldwin (1777 – 14 December 1861) was an Irish soldier and civil servant. When he was fourteen he joined the Royal Navy, and two years later, after being deemed medically unfit to serve in that branch, the British Army. In 1808, as an ensign in the 87th Foot, he purchased a Lieutenancy in the 83rd Foot. He served in the Peninsular War, where he was wounded four times, and by the end of that conflict was a decorated Captain and the Aide-de-camp to General Thomas Picton.

From 1820 to 1826, when he exchanged from the 50th Foot to half-pay, Baldwin served as a Brigade-Major in Britain and the West Indies. Afterward, he helped organise and command a regiment that supported Pedro I of Brazil.

In 1828 he moved to Toronto Gore Township in Upper Canada, along with some of his soldiers including William John O'Grady. Here he built a church and a school, and was appointed justice of the peace, roads commissioner, and militia colonel. Although identified with the reform movement, Baldwin opposed the rebellion of 1837 and lead 1,200 men, at his own expense, to protect Niagara from rebels. In the process, he incurred debts that haunted him the rest of his life.

A distant cousin of Robert Baldwin, he was a politically outspoken advocate of Irish Catholics, opposing the Orange Order and what was perceived as the conservative's affinity for it. His closest allies in this were the bishops Alexander Macdonell, Michael Power, and Armand-François-Marie de Charbonnel. He ran for election as a reform candidate in 1841 in 2nd York riding against the Orangeman George Duggan, but withdrew due to the threat of violence. In 1841 he sold his Army commission.

During Toronto's 1847 cholera epidemic, Baldwin had his home converted into a hospital for the poor.
