= William John O'Grady =

Irish Catholic priest (died 1840)

William John O'Grady (died c. August 18, 1840) was an Irish Catholic priest and journalist in Upper Canada. He served as chaplain to Connell James Baldwin's soldiers in Brazil, and followed him to Toronto Gore Township in 1828. From January 1829 he was pastor of St. Paul's church in York.

He died at Whitby in 1840.
