= Corporations (Upper Canada) =

There were two types of corporations at work in the Upper Canadian economy: the legislatively chartered companies and the unregulated joint stock companies. These two business forms had different legal standing; chartered corporations had a "separate personality" - they were a legal person quite distinct from its members or shareholders, a legal fiction which protected those shareholders with limited liability. In contrast, joint stock companies were made illegal by the English Bubble Act 1720. Joint stock companies were considered extensive partnerships under common law, and English legislation limited these to a maximum of six partners. Without incorporation, the company was not considered a "separate personality." It could not hold property; this was held by trustees, who usually had to provide a bond or security. Without incorporation, the company could neither sue nor be sued at law. And without incorporation, shareholders were personally responsible for the debts to the company to the full extent of their personal property; shareholders were not protected by limited liability. There were, then, significant legal hurdles that made the joint stock company an unwieldy form of partnership.

Despite the difficulties in the unincorporated joint stock company form, it became increasingly popular in the late eighteenth century in Britain as the means through which public works were carried out. General public feeling was that all corporations, chartered or otherwise, should only be founded for the public benefit. Although a limited number of companies were formed for the purpose of for-profit trade, others were simply a way of controlling forms of common property.

== Joint-stock companies ==
The joint stock company was popular in building public works, since they should be for general public benefit, and would otherwise be sacrificed to "legislated monopolies" with "exclusive privileges" such as the Bank of Upper Canada. As late as 1849, even the "moderate" reform politician Robert Baldwin was to complain that "unless a stop were made to it, there would be nothing but corporations from one end of the country to the other." Radical reformers, like William Lyon Mackenzie, who opposed all such "legislated monopolies," saw joint stock associations as the only protection against "the whole property of the country... being tied up as an irredeemable appendage to incorporated institutions, and put beyond the reach of individual possession."

As a result, most of the joint stock companies formed in this period were created by political reformers who objected to the legislated monopolies granted to members of the Family Compact. The political connection results from the fact the company was a voluntary association that was "also a mini-republic. Typically, each was a self-governing body composed of members of equal standing who had freely consented to join. Members created an association, devised its rules and policies, and elected officers from among their ranks to carry out their wishes."

In Upper Canada, the joint stock company is an interesting example of the voluntary "mini-parliament" because it fostered notions of "responsible government" through its separation of ownership and management. Responsible government usually means cabinet responsibility to the elected House of Assembly; in alternate terms, of management to stockholders. However, responsible government had a second sense in the case of joint stock companies, i.e. the accountability of stockholders to management. Since joint stock companies lacked limited liability, stockholders were responsible for all the company's debts to the full extent of their personal property. They were an incubator of stakeholder democracy. The joint stock company required an unusually high level of "vigilance" from its members, a word borrowed from the "committees of vigilance" later established by the reformers; they remained ultimately responsible for the actions taken by their representatives in parliament and on the board of directors.

See Frederick H. Armstrong, Handbook of Upper Canadian Chronology, rev. ed. (Toronto, Dundurn Press, 1985), Part VII, for a list of the joint stock companies incorporated during this period in Upper Canada.

- Bank of the People: The Bank of the People was a joint stock bank created by radical Reform politicians James Lesslie, James Hervey Price, and Dr John Rolph in Toronto in 1835. It was founded after they failed to establish a "Provincial Loan Office" in which farmers could borrow small sums guaranteed by their land holdings. The Bank of the People was the only bank in Upper Canada not to suspend payments during the financial panic of 1837–8. Many of the shareholders, however, took part in the Rebellion of 1837 and the Family Compact plotted to have it taken over by the Bank of Montreal in 1840.
- Farmer's Bank: Two brash Devonshire businessmen, Capt. George Truscott and John Cleveland Green had served in the British Army in Canada. They formed a private partnership and established the Agricultural Bank at Toronto in 1834. In 1835, they issued a circular calling for shareholders in a new (competing) "Farmer's Bank" with Charles Duncombe as its president. Truscott and Green turned to those opposed to the Bank of Upper Canada for financial support. Although Truscott & Green had touted Charles Duncombe as president of the new bank to solicit reform support, the chair of the general meeting of subscribers on 16 June was the Hon. John Elmsley, legislative councillor, and the largest shareholder in the Bank of Upper Canada. He engaged in a bitter proxy war and managed to take over control of the bank. Elmsley had clear but fragile ties with the Family Compact. He was a retired naval officer; a legislative councillor and former executive councillor; the son of a former chief justice from whom he inherited a large estate; and the son-in-law of Judge Levius Sherwood.
- Farmers' Storehouse Company: The Farmers' Storehouse was organized as an unincorporated joint stock company on the 7 February 1824. The Farmers' Storehouse was both a producers and consumer cooperative. Farmers sold their wheat an flour through the company and purchased their needs from its store. They could also obtain small loans equal to the share capital they held. The Farmers' Storehouse company also tried to establish itself as a bank. They built a warehouse 100 feet long by 20 ft. wide, and 20 ft. high where the St. Lawrence market building now stands in Toronto. The first president of the company was Joseph Shepard, a prominent Reform organizer with close ties to William Lyon Mackenzie. The company had 5 board members, a $3000 capitalization, and was operated by a store-keeper. It was widely emulated throughout the province by the "Newcastle District Accommodation Company" (near Peterborough) and the "Bath Freeholders' Bank" (near Kingston).
- Toronto Mechanics' Institute:
- Toronto House of Industry: In 1834, the United Kingdom passed a new Poor Law which created the system of Victorian workhouses (or "Houses of Industry") that Charles Dickens described in Oliver Twist. Sir Francis Bond Head, the new Lt. Governor of Upper Canada in 1836, had been a Poor Law administrator before his appointment. Head introduced legislation for these workhouses but a small group of reformers and dissenting ministers in Toronto led by James Lesslie and Dr William W. Baldwin founded the Toronto House of Industry as a joint stock company on alternate, humane principles. The Toronto House of Industry was started by the reformers in the 'unused' courthouse on Richmond Street in January 1837 where they had previously met as the "Canadian Alliance Society" of which Lesslie had been president.
- Mississippi Emigration Society: In the wake of the Upper Canada Rebellion, disappointed Reformers formed the Mississippi Emigration Society which proposed to purchase a large block of land at Davenport, Iowa for the erection of a mill, other property to be held in common, and redistribution among shareholders. The organizers included James Lesslie, Peter Perry, Francis Hincks, J. Hervey Price and Thomas Parke. Lesslie, Hincks and Price were all involved in the management of the Bank of the People, and were the designated agents for the company. The committee faced significant obstacles to purchasing a large contiguous block of land. Interest in the Mississippi Land Company slowly eroded throughout 1839, and those interested in emigration did so with their own resources.

=== Churches ===
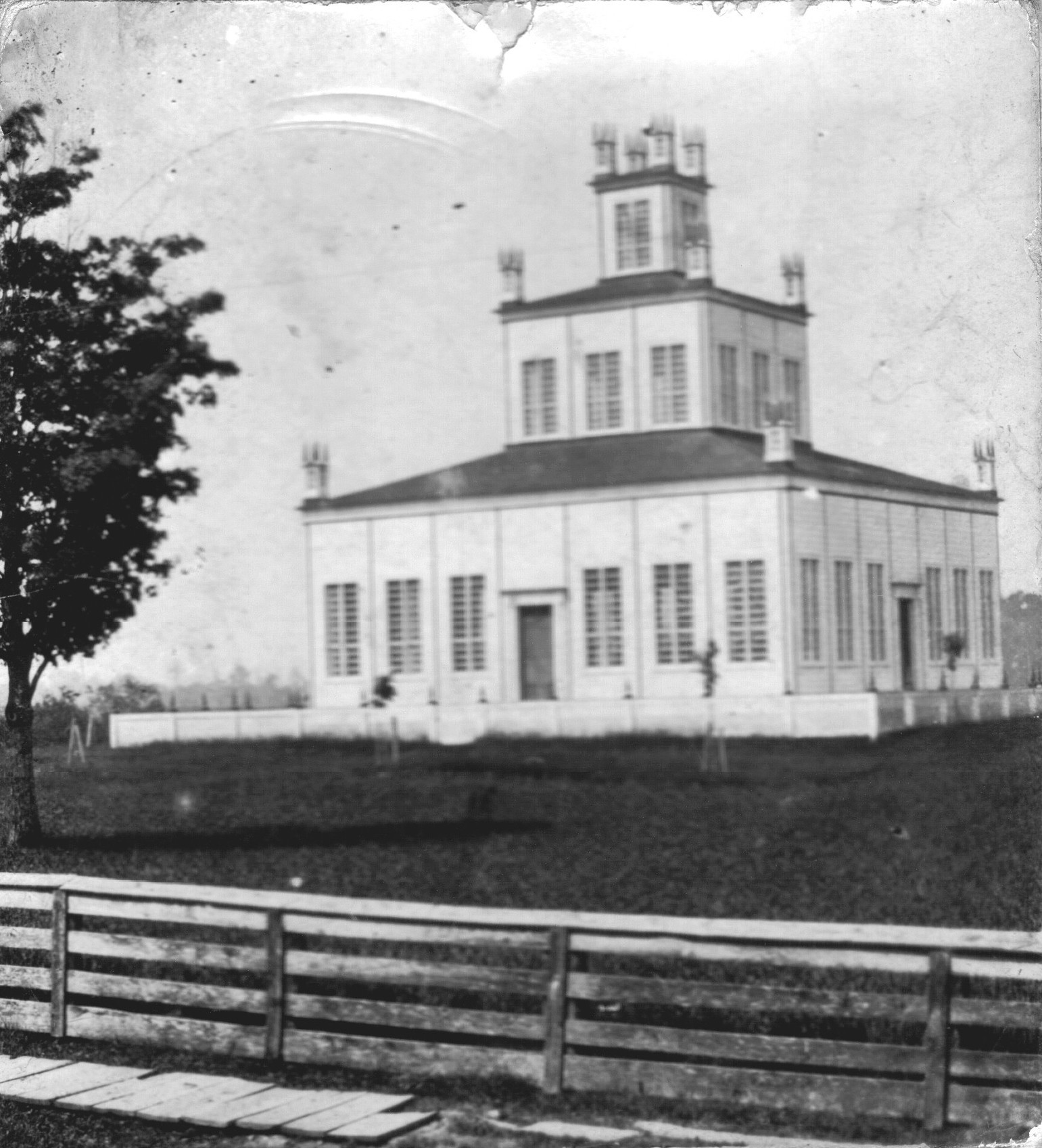
The Sharon Temple, Sharon, Ontario circa 1860.

- The Children of Peace: The Children of Peace were a utopian Quaker sect that emerged during the War of 1812 under the leadership of David Willson. Today, they are primarily remembered for the Sharon Temple, an architectural symbol of their vision of a society based on the values of peace, equality and social justice. The group had no legal standing, hence they formed a joint-stock company in 1832 to manage their Temple and two other churches, as well as other assets, including what is probably Canada's first credit union.

=== Steamship companies ===
- PS Frontenac:
- The Colborne:

== Chartered companies ==
William Lyon Mackenzie frequently complained about the manner in which members of the Family Compact utilized their official positions for monetary gain, especially through corporations such as the Bank of Upper Canada, and the two land companies (the Clergy Corporation and the Canada Company) that between them controlled two sevenths of all the land in the province. The Bank of Upper Canada, for example, had been founded by William Allan and the Rev. John Strachan, key members of the Family Compact, both of whom were Executive and Legislative Councillors. Although they lacked the minimum capital needed to found the bank, they persuaded the government to subscribe for a quarter of its shares. During the 1830s, a third of the bank's board were Legislative or Executive Councillors, and the remaining all magistrates. Despite repeated attempts, the elected Legislature - which had chartered the bank - could obtain no details about the bank's workings.

=== Land companies ===
- Canada Company: The Canada Company was a large private chartered British land development company, incorporated by an act of British parliament on July 27, 1825, to aid the colonization of Upper Canada. The government of Upper Canada sold the company 10,000 km^{2} of land for £341000.
- Clergy Corporation: The Clergy Corporation was incorporated in 1819 to manage the Clergy Reserves, equal in size to the Crown Reserves held by the Canada Company. After the Rev. John Strachan was appointed to the Executive Council, the advisory body to the Lieutenant Governor, in 1815, he began to push for the Church of England's autonomous control of the clergy reserves on the model of the Clergy Corporation created in Lower Canada in 1817. Although all clergymen in the Church of England were members of the body corporate, the act prepared in 1819 by Strachan's former student, Attorney General John Beverly Robinson, also appointed the Inspector General and the Surveyor General to the board, and made a quorum of three for meetings; these two public officers also sat on the Legislative Council with Strachan. These three were usually members of the Family Compact.

=== Bank and insurance companies ===
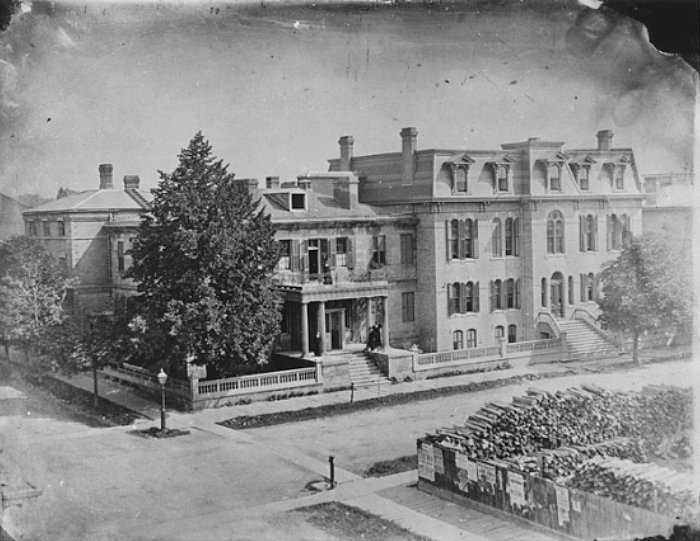
The Bank of Upper Canada Building in 1872 (Adelaide Street, Toronto)

- Bank of Upper Canada: The Bank of Upper Canada was established in 1821 under a Charter granted by the legislature of Upper Canada in 1819 to a group of Kingston merchants. This charter was "stolen" by the more influential Executive Councillors to the Lt. Governor, the Rev. John Strachan and William Allan and moved to Toronto. The bank was closely associated with the group that came to be known as the Family Compact, and formed a large part of their wealth. Complaints about the bank were a staple of Reform agitation in the 1830s due to its monopoly and aggressive legal actions against debtors.
- Bank of British North America: The Bank of British North America was founded in 1835 in London, England with offices in Toronto, Montreal, Quebec City, Saint John, New Brunswick, Halifax and St. John's, Newfoundland.
- British America Fire and Life Assurance Company
- Commercial Bank of the Midland District: The Bank of Upper Canada used all of its influence to prevent any other bank from being chartered in the province. This monopoly was crucial to keeping its notes in circulation and boosting its profits. They succeeded only until 1832 when the Commercial Bank of the Midland District was chartered in Kingston.
- Home District Savings Bank: Banks in this period did not have savings accounts. In order to encourage the working poor of the city to save for periods of unemployment, the Lt. Governor pushed for the establishment of a Home District Savings Bank on June 5, 1830 "for the earnings of Journeymen Tradesmen, Mechanics, Servants, Labourers."

=== Transportation companies ===
- Desjardins Canal: The Desjardins Canal, named after its promoter Pierre Desjardins, was built to give Dundas, Ontario, easier access to Lake Ontario and the Great Lakes system of North America. The project to build Desjardins Canal continued for ten years, from 1827 to 1837. It was a local operation with limited objectives and attracted financial backers and political support almost exclusively from within Upper Canada.
- Toronto and Lake Huron Railroad company:
- First Welland Canal: The Welland Canal is a ship canal in Canada that extends 42 km (26 mi) from Port Weller, Ontario, on Lake Ontario, to Port Colborne, Ontario, on Lake Erie. An act of the Legislature formed the Welland Canal Company on January 19, 1824, with a capitalization of $150,000 and William Merritt as the financial agent. As part of his fundraising duties, he travelled extensively, including the United States and Great Britain. Capital for the canal came primarily from New York, but control of the board of directors was vested in the Family Compact.

=== Trading companies ===
- Hudson's Bay Company
