= Agriculture in Upper Canada =

Upper Canada (now Ontario) had few exports with which to pay for its imported manufactured needs. For those who settled in rural areas, debt could be paid off only through the sale of wheat and flour. However, for much of the 1820s, the price of wheat went through cycles of boom and bust depending upon the British markets that ultimately provided the credit upon which the farmer lived.

In the decade 1830-9, exports of wheat averaged less than £1 per person a year (less than £6 per household), and in the 1820s just half that.

== The wheat staple hypothesis ==
Early Canadian economic historian Harold Innis argued that Canada developed as it did because of the nature of its staple commodities: raw materials, such as fish, fur, lumber, agricultural products and minerals, that were exported to Europe. This trading link cemented Canada's cultural links to Europe, but made Canada dependent. The search for and exploitation of these staples led to the creation of institutions that defined the political culture of the nation and its regions. His conceptual use of "heartland" and "hinterland" relations is similar to the "dependency theory" of Andre Gunder Frank. Innis's concepts were taken up by other historians such as Donald Creighton, who examined the development of the staples trade with Britain in the Commercial Empire of the St. Lawrence (1937).

More recently, historian Douglas McCalla has questioned the staples hypothesis, arguing that an indigenous settler capitalist development process resulted in the province's economic growth.

== Settlement ==
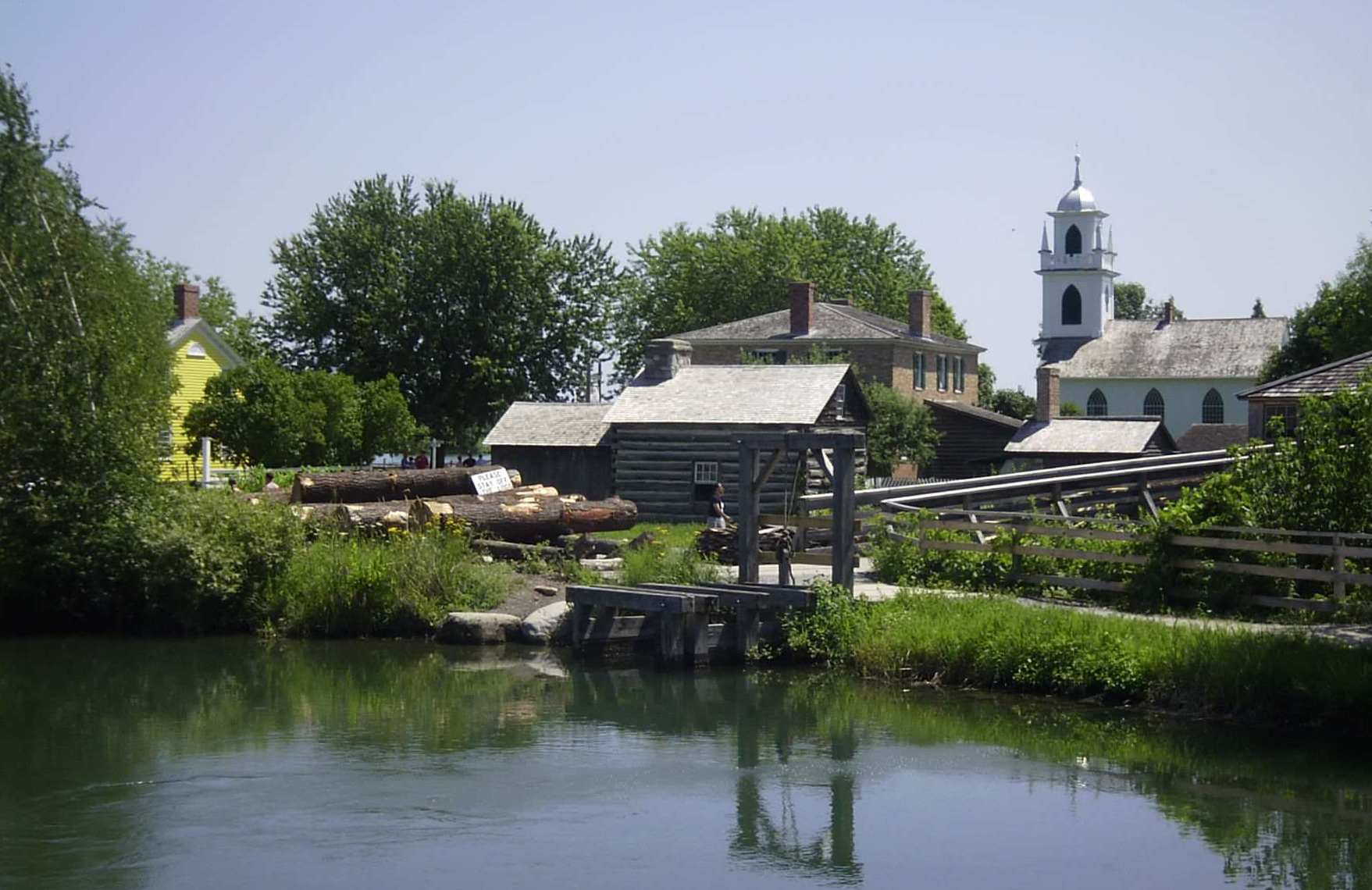
Upper Canada Village, a heritage site preserving early Upper Canada's farming past

Crown land policy to 1825 was not geared towards establishing a land market. It rewarded the "United Empire Loyalists" with large, unencumbered grants in the thousands of acres. These grants "permitted a cash-strapped society to reward those who had served it and to pay in a currency that all valued. Lt. Governor Simcoe also saw this as the mechanism by which an aristocracy might be created." These Loyalists, who tended also to be Justices of the Peace, were thus wealthier, and tended to adopt the more capital-intensive "improved agriculture" of the gentlemanly farmers of the United Kingdom. Those who did not receive free land were forced to become "wheat miners."

=== Land sale system ===
The greater portion of British emigrants, arriving in Canada without funds and the most exalted ideas of the value and productiveness of land, purchase extensively on credit ... Everything goes on well for a short time. A log-house is erected with the assistance of old settlers, and the clearing of forest is commenced. Credit is obtained at a neighbouring store ... During this period he has led a life of toil and privation ... On the arrival of the fourth harvest, he is reminded by the storekeeper to pay his account with cash, or discharge part of it with his disposable produce, for which he gets a very small price. He is also informed that the purchase money of the land has been accumulating with interest ... he finds himself poorer than when he commenced operation. Disappointment preys on his spirit ... the land ultimately reverts to the former proprietor, or a new purchaser is found.

-- Patrick Shirreff], 1835

The land grant policy changed after 1825. The provincial administration faced a financial crisis that otherwise required raising local taxes, thereby making it more dependent on a local elected legislature. The state ended its policy of granting land to "unofficial" settlers and implemented a broad plan of revenue-generating sales. The Crown replaced its old policy of land grants to ordinary settlers in newly opened districts with land sales by auction. It also passed legislation that allowed the auctioning of previously granted land for payment of back-taxes. Large areas of land passed to speculators.

This sales policy meant that the second generation of 'later Loyalists' and new immigrants required substantial amounts of capital to start a new farm. The cost was between £100 and £200 plus the cost of the land.

The average cultivated farm size was about 30 acres of cleared land, and it would take a farmer a lifetime to accomplish that. Clearing rates averaged between 1.47 and 3.18 acres per year.

The annual adult consumption of food in the 1830s would include 13 bushels of wheat, 120-160 lbs of pork, 60 pounds of beef, 30 pounds of lamb and 30 bushels of potatoes. A child would eat half that. With an average household having 6.5 people, they would need 62 bushels of wheat for themselves. This is roughly the product of 2.5 acres of land. A 25-acre farm would thus produce 132–188-bushel marketable surplus, raising between £5 and £45 depending on wheat prices assuming they were in full production - unlikely in the early years. In fact, the average was between £2 and £6 in the 1830s.

25 acres of land would cost between £70 and £140, and most private mortgages never exceeded seven years. Annual mortgage costs thus ranged from £10 to £20 plus interest. Most farmers would purchase at least 50 acres of land doubling these figures. New farmers with smaller acreages had very thin profit margins. Frequent indebtedness and bankruptcy were common. The only alternative for many was to adopt an environmentally destructive form of 'wheat mining' whereby they maximized their output of wheat to pay off debts.

=== Wheat mining ===
"Wheat mining" refers to the environmentally damaging practice of repeated sowing of wheat on a plot of recently cleared land despite rapidly decreasing yields due to soil exhaustion. The technique was used by poor farmers trying to accumulate capital, and who would sell the exhausted land to new immigrants willing to pay for cleared acreage. Yields could drop from a maximum of 300 bushels of wheat on new land, to an average of 25 bushels. The wheat miner would use about 50% of the average 25 acre cleared farm for wheat farming, as opposed to those who would rotate crops and allow land to lie fallow, who used only a third of their acreage.

== Gentlemanly farming ==
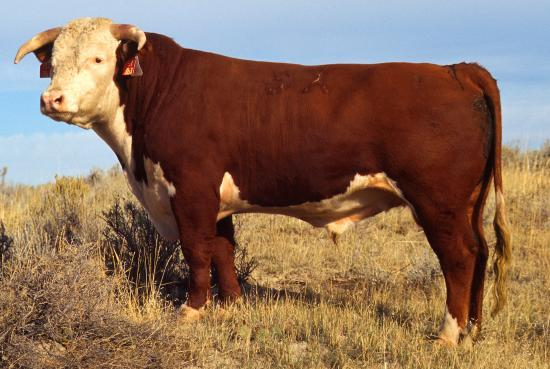
A Hereford bull of the type imported after 1817

"Improved farming" refers to a capital-intensive form of farming introduced by the "improving landlords" of Great Britain - the aristocracy who had large estates that they were beginning to farm as capitalist enterprises. These improved farming methods were introduced to Upper Canada by the half-pay military officers from aristocratic background who tended to become magistrates in Upper Canada and build large estates. "Mixed or improved farming was one part of a total life-style... As well as permitting them to practise improved farming and to develop a reasonably elegant life-style, their financial independence allowed them the leisure time necessary for them to act as 'leaders' of their community." The improved methods included the use of fallow, fertilizer and crop rotation. They followed a pattern of mixed farming, with an emphasis on animal husbandry, rather than mono-cropping wheat. They introduced hybrid animals, often at great cost, from the United Kingdom. For an example of these hybrid seeds see:

- William Custead "Catalogue of fruit & ornamental trees, flowering shrubs, garden seeds and green-house plants, bulbous roots & flower seeds, cultivated and for sale at the Toronto Nursery, Dundas Street, near York" (York (Toronto): William Lyon Mackenzie, Colonial Advocate Press, 1827), 18 pp.

=== Farm labour ===
Mixed farming was also labour-intensive. Gentlemanly farmers had the resources to hire farm workers. They complained however about the high cost of that labour. They thus pushed the government to increase the cost per acre of its land sales, to force more immigrants to seek employment rather than buy their own farms. They also encouraged the "assisted immigration" of Britain's poor, a process described as "shovelling out the paupers."

=== Formation of estates ===
Members of the Family Compact were interested in building up estates in which they imitated the "improved farming" methods of the English aristocracy. The cities of Toronto and Hamilton were surrounded by the estates of the Family Compact.

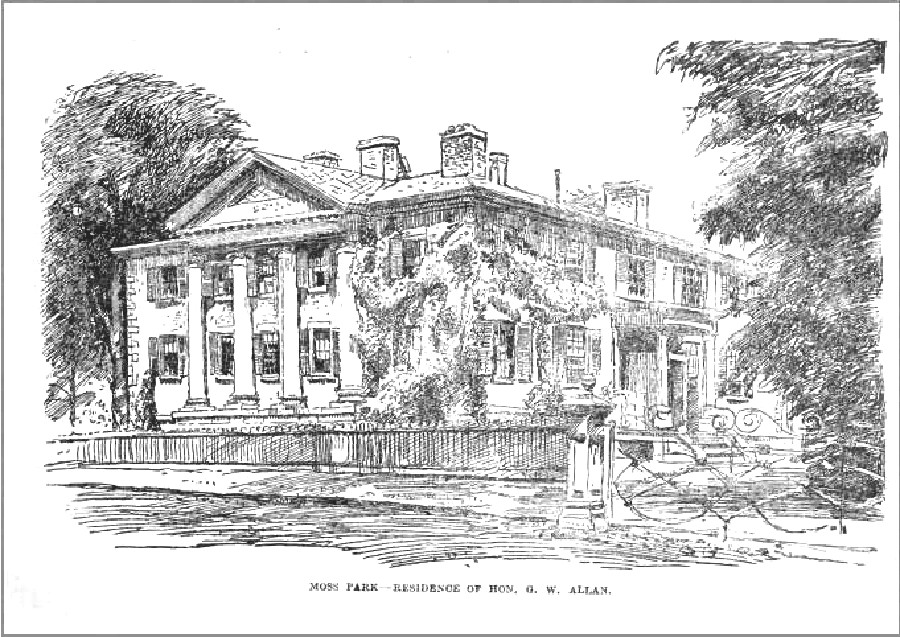
'Moss Park', 1889, the estate of William Allen

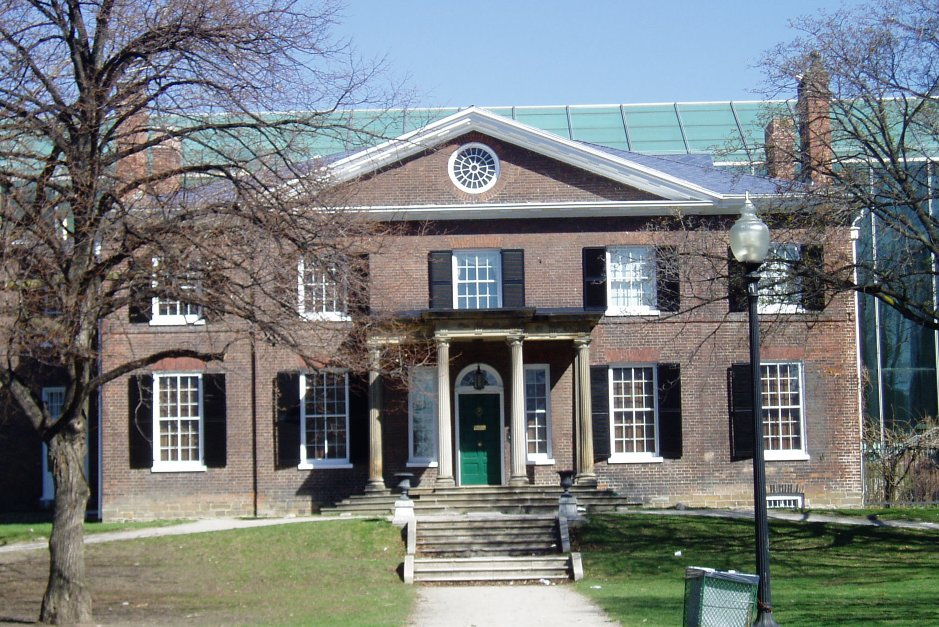
The Grange, estate of D'Arcy Boulton Jr.

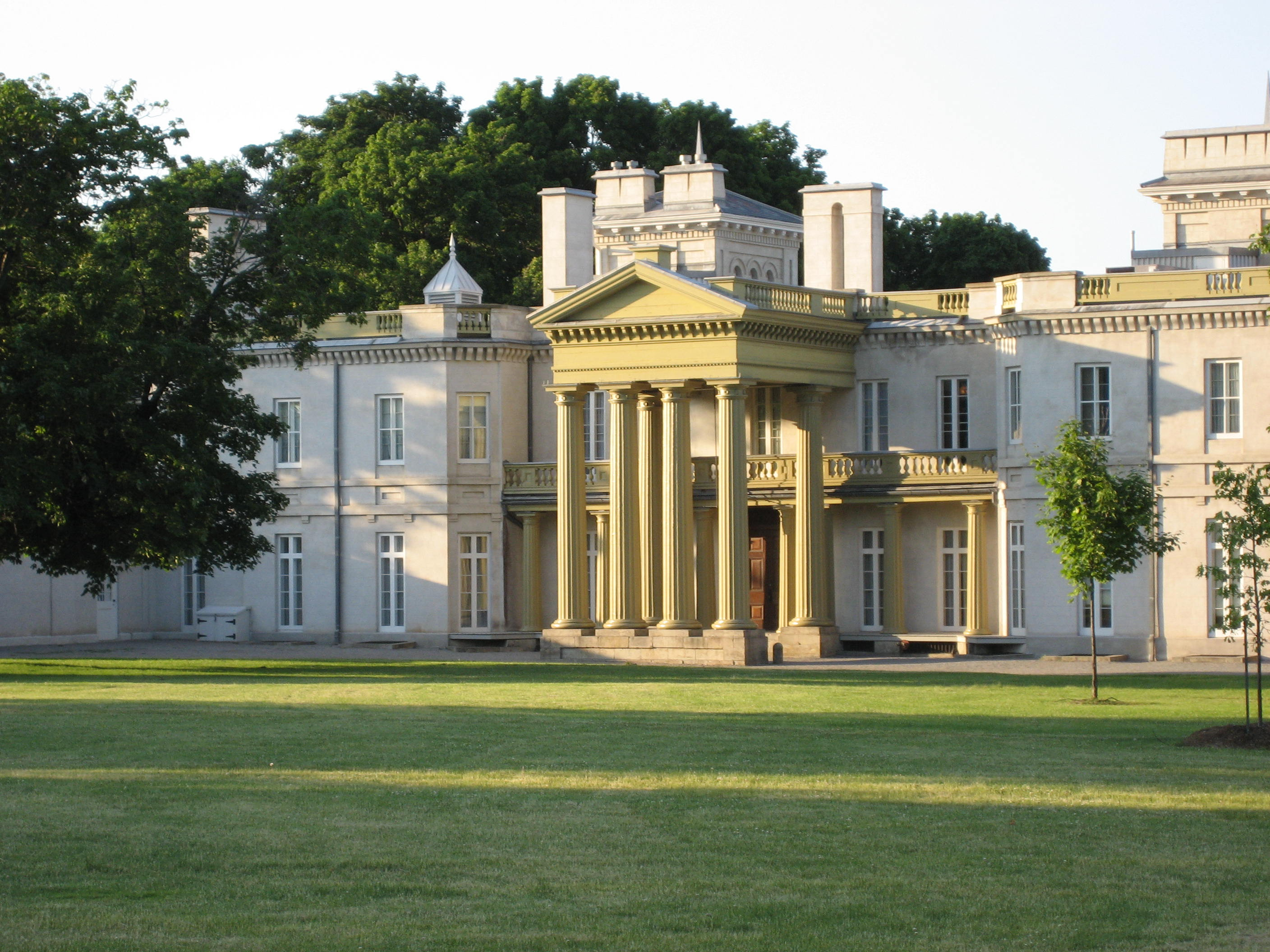
Dundurn Castle, Hamilton, estate of Sir Allen McNab

=== Agricultural Societies ===
Agricultural Societies were formed early in the province's history as a way of encouraging mixed farming, and animal husbandry in particular. Practical farming was not the concern of these "philosophical" agricultural societies for gentlemen. These societies received state subsidies to award prizes to the best animals - usually expensive imported breeds unavailable to ordinary farmers. The first was formed in Hamilton and lasted from 1791 to 1806. A number of other small societies popped up and disappeared, and it was not until the Legislature passed a law subsidizing district agricultural societies in 1830 that they took off. Societies were formed in the Home, Western, Johnstown, Eastern and Gore districts. Others were formed in the Bathurst district in 1832, Prince Edward in 1833 and London in 1836. Grants to these societies totalled £1,607 in 1841.

== Subsistence-surplus farming ==
=== Role of the market ===
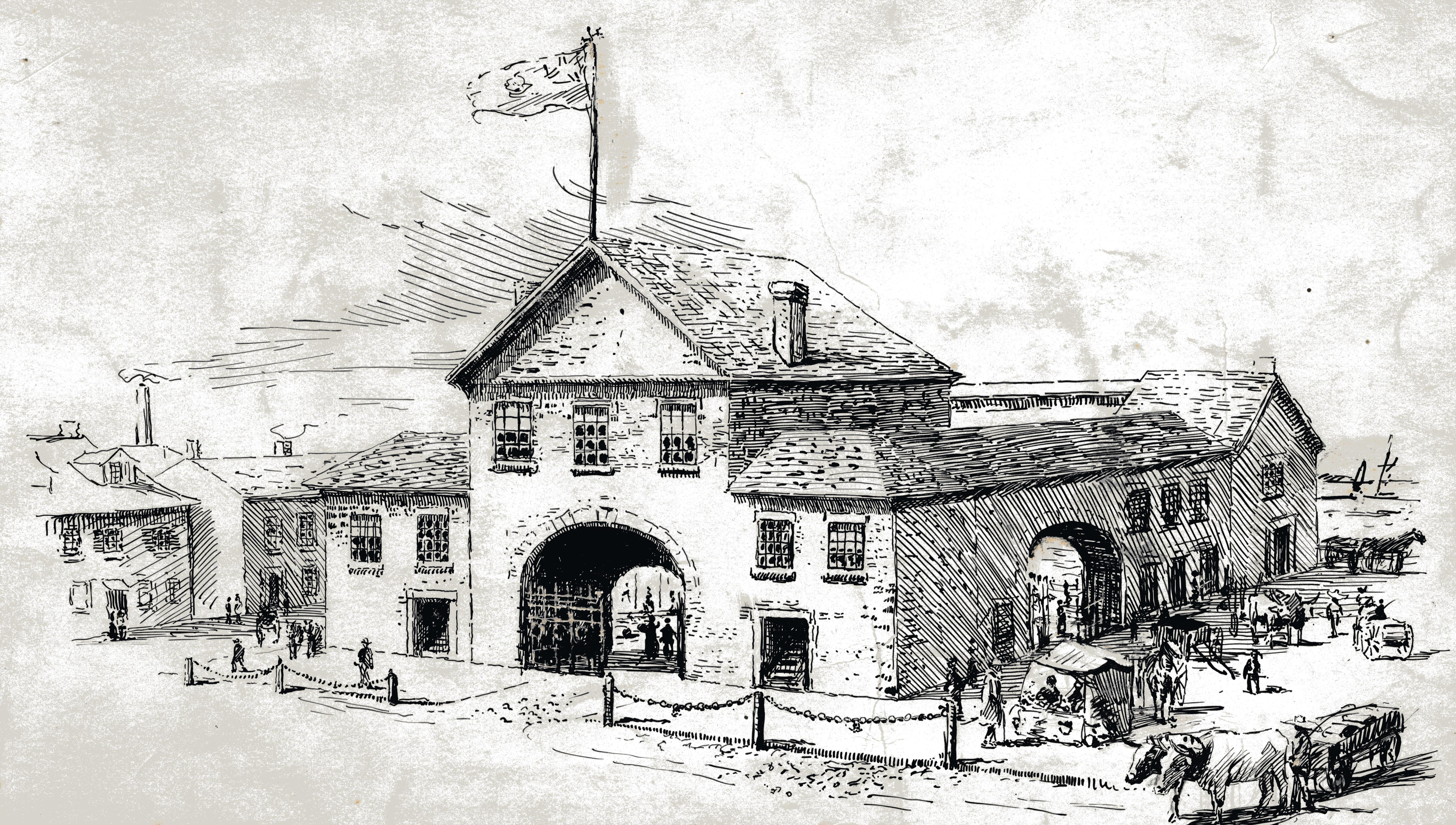
Second market in York (Toronto)

Both wheat miners and gentleman farmers depended upon the market. Many farmers, however, sought to limit their dependence on the market, and on merchants in particular. Those merchants used the laws for imprisonment for debt to extort extra profit from farmers.

The presence of markets is not, in itself, an incentive to capitalist production. Hutterite farmers in Western Canada for example, are religious communists who sell their crops collectively in the market. In communities in the American northeast farmers sought to maintain their economic and political autonomy from merchants by providing for their own subsistence without having to purchase in the market. This practice of ensuring that the consumption needs of the family and community are met first before entering the marketplace to sell what was left over is referred to as a subsistence-surplus farming strategy. This is not saying that these farmers are self-subsistent. Non-market exchanges (barter) within the community provide those elements which no single farm household could produce for itself. These circumstances were typical of early trade in the province.

Local non-market exchanges were usually expressed in prices, but these prices appear to have been standard, and rarely in cash. The exchanges took place over lengthy periods and were rarely equal in value. The local community, including the local merchant, were thus tied together by multiple ties of debt and credit which were reconciled only after lengthy periods, and usually without cash. For example, "Alexander McMartin, a merchant and miller at Martintown, in the Eastern District, and Donald McNaught, a carpenter. In March 1852 they reckoned their mutual dealings for the past seven years. During that period, McNaught had earned £53 by his craft and run up £47 in charges at McMartin's enterprises. Here an exchange of £6 could settle £100 worth of transactions."

Numerous studies have shown that the first half of the nineteenth century was not necessarily characterized by grand changes in the degree of market participation by farmers, but by increasingly well-integrated national and international markets regulated by elites using laissez-faire principles. That is, farmers did not change their mix of subsistence and market production to any great degree; but the market that they sold in became increasingly well organized, and international in scope bolstered by a host of new financial service institutions such as banks and insurance companies.

=== Subsistence first ===
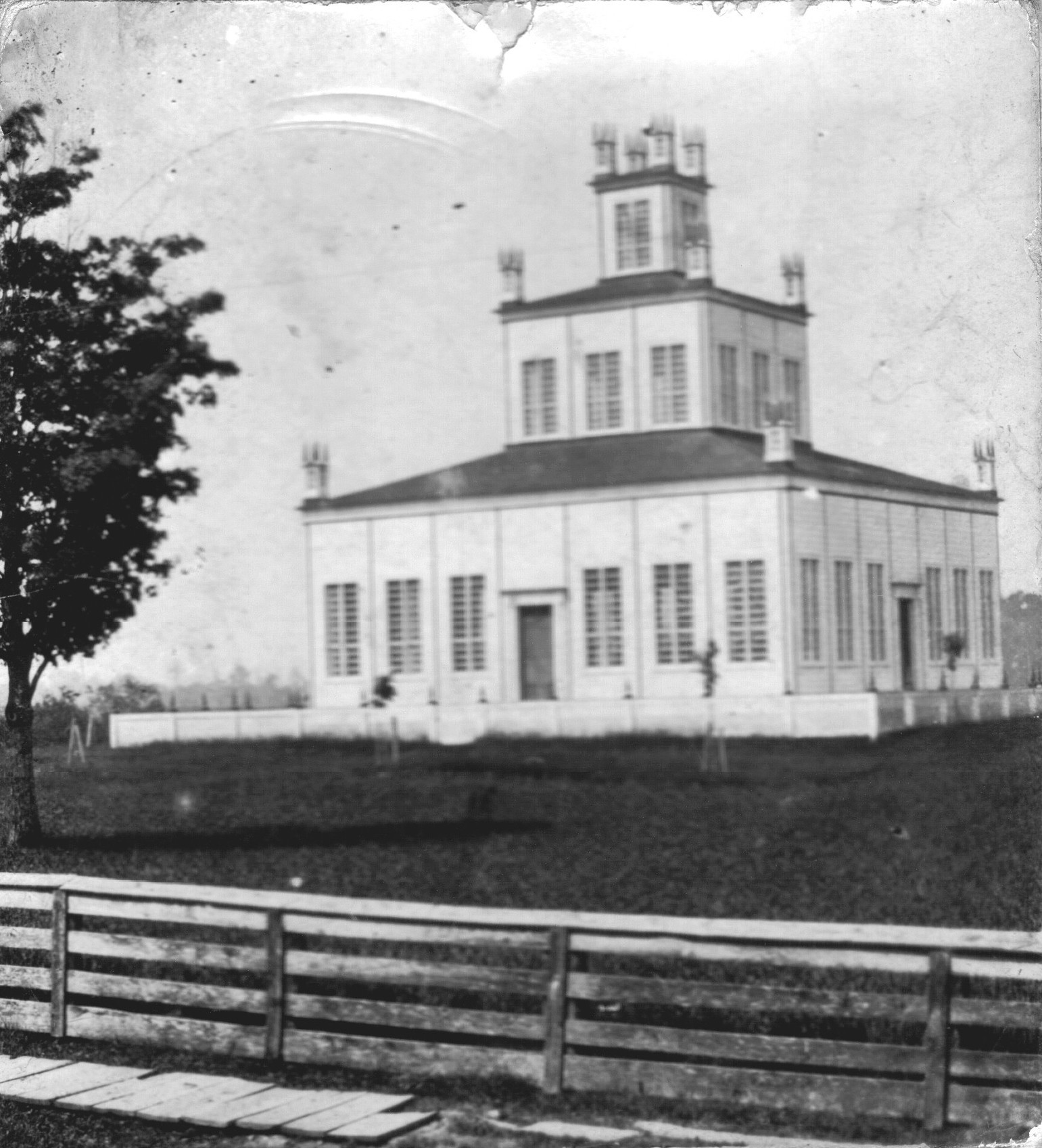
The Temple of the Children of Peace in Hope (Sharon)

The importance of high-lighting the Subsistence-surplus strategy lies in the non-market mentality of the farmer who resists market cues and cannot be considered a profit maximizing individualist. By prioritizing subsistence first, the farmer may give up opportunities for profit because they are embedded in community networks based on mutual exchange and cooperation. Rather than risk all for higher profits in a highly variable and unpredictable market, farmers will prioritize the needs of the larger local community that provides them support in times of need. A highly visible example of these strategies is the community of Hope (now Sharon) where a small religious group of former Quakers started Canada's first credit union and ran Canada's first agricultural co-operative, the Farmers' Storehouse company. They also had Canada's first homeless shelter. All of these community building efforts were supported by the group's elders, who rejected profit making and invested in their community instead. These institutions were designed to preserve the younger members from undue pressure from the merchants and market.

=== Work bees ===
A "work bee" was a labour exchange between farm households. The work bee replaced the need to hire labour, which was expensive and hard to find. When large tasks like harvesting, clearing land or building a house had to be accomplished, a family would invite neighbours to help with the speedy completion of the task. The labour contributed was unpaid, but when those individuals had a bee of their own, there was a strong moral compunction to return the favour. The networks of farm families tied together by labour exchanges of this kind helped define communities and give them a sense of shared purpose. The same groups would also be called for community-building purposes such as school or church construction.

=== Cooperatives ===
The work bee was a form of cooperative labour exchange. Other kinds of exchanges could also be organized cooperatively. One example is the Farmers' Storehouse company organized in Toronto in 1825. The Farmers' Storehouse was both a producers and consumer cooperative. It served all the farmers of the old Home District (current York Region). Farmers sold their wheat and flour through the company and purchased their needs from its store. They could also obtain small loans equal to the share capital they held.

It was widely emulated throughout the province. The "Newcastle District Accommodation Company" (near Peterborough) and the "Bath Freeholders' Bank" (near Kingston) were a similar form of marketing cooperative and credit union.

== Market and moral economy strategies ==
Although markets developed throughout Upper Canada, by mid-century "only a small fraction of farms was producing a marketable surplus great enough to provide for more than just the local non-agricultural population." Upper Canada's economic history is surely more complex than a history of the triumph of the market might reveal. Given the minor role of the market in the household economy, should we expect the farmer to behave as a merchant would? Rather than narrowly defining farmers as either market, or subsistence oriented, we should see where they fall on the scale between the two and ask what social dynamics emerge from the often-contradictory demands which result. Upper Canada should be compared to the North-eastern United States at the time, from which most of the Upper Canadian farmers came.

Christopher Clark has characterized this period in the North-eastern United States in terms of a moral economy in which local communities regulated the economic activity of their members according to community standards, and so muted the individualizing effect of the market. First elaborated by English historian E.P. Thompson, the concept of a moral economy was developed further in anthropological studies. Thompson wrote of the moral economy of the poor in the context of widespread food riots in the English countryside. These riots, he argued, were well-orchestrated acts that demonstrated a common political culture rooted in feudal rights to "set the price" of essential goods in the market; moral economists held that a traditional fair price was more important to the community than a "free market" price. The poor punished large farmers who sold their surpluses at higher prices outside the village while there were still those in need within the village. The concept of a moral economy has been linked by others (with Thompson's approval) to subsistence agriculture and the need for subsistence insurance in hard times. Clark thus calls for the re-examination of the transition to capitalism in rural America as a shift from a moral economy rooted in subsistence production to a capitalist economy rooted in the production of goods for market exchange. He views the moral economy, and the subsistence agriculture of rural America, as something supplanted by a cash-cropping free market farm economy only over a long period of social conflict in the early nineteenth century.

Given that the North-eastern US and Upper Canada were tied in the same international markets, were settled by the same extended families, and utilized the same farming techniques and strategies, Clark's results probably hold for Upper Canada as well.

=== Market resistance & rebellion ===
Most "social and economic historians have tended to emphasize the role of riot and protest in asserting the older values of the 'moral economy' against the capitalist market". However, Subsistence-surplus farmers could resist being integrated in markets by strengthening their existing co-operative practices, such as work bees and mutual credit. Resistance could also take the form of "Friendly Societies." Friendly Societies were democratically organized self-help community insurance organizations designed to alleviate tragedies arising from accident, sickness and old age. Regular contributions to a common fund entitled the society member to relief under prescribed circumstances thereby preserving that member's respectability in the face of calamity. Legislation had been passed in Britain in 1793 giving the Friendly Societies legal standing while confirming the illegality of other forms of popular organization. The act legalizing Friendly Societies came in a period of great public unease and economic distress, with the French Revolution as backdrop. These co-operative ventures were increasingly organized under the banner of Owenite socialism during the 1820s.

== See also ==
- History of agriculture in Canada
