= James Lesslie =

James Lesslie (November 22, 1802 – April 19, 1885) was an Ontario bookseller, reform politician and newspaper publisher. His career was closely associated with - and somewhat overshadowed by - William Lyon Mackenzie, the Reform agitator, mayor of Toronto, and Rebellion leader. However, as a leader himself, Lesslie took a prominent role in founding the Mechanics Institute (for adult education), the House of Refuge & Industry (a shelter for the unemployed), the Bank of the People, as well as the political parties known as the Canadian Alliance Society and Clear Grits. In many way, he defined the Reform movement in Upper Canada without having reverted to the violent methods of Mackenzie. His legacy may thus have lasted longer.

== Early life ==
James Lesslie was born in Dundee, Scotland in 1802, the son of Edward Lesslie, a bookseller. James emigrated to Kingston, Upper Canada in 1822 as part of a plan to relocate the family business to Canada. He was joined by brothers John, George, Charles, William and Joseph between 1820 and 1823. Lesslie and Sons operated stores in York (later Toronto), Kingston and Dundas. James took over the Toronto store with his brother Joseph, from brother John, in 1832. The stores expanded from books and stationery to include pharmaceutical products.

== Reform activity ==
In many respects, Lesslie's life ran in parallel to Mackenzie's, from their birth in Dundee, their immigration to Upper Canada, their albeit brief business partnership, to their lifelong commitment to Reform politics. Lesslie was an astute politician, and helped found many of the city's working-class institutions, from the Mechanics Institute to the House of Refuge and Industry. He was also a city Alderman when Mackenzie was mayor, and the president of the Political Union that supported Mackenzie's legislative battles.

=== Mechanics Institute ===
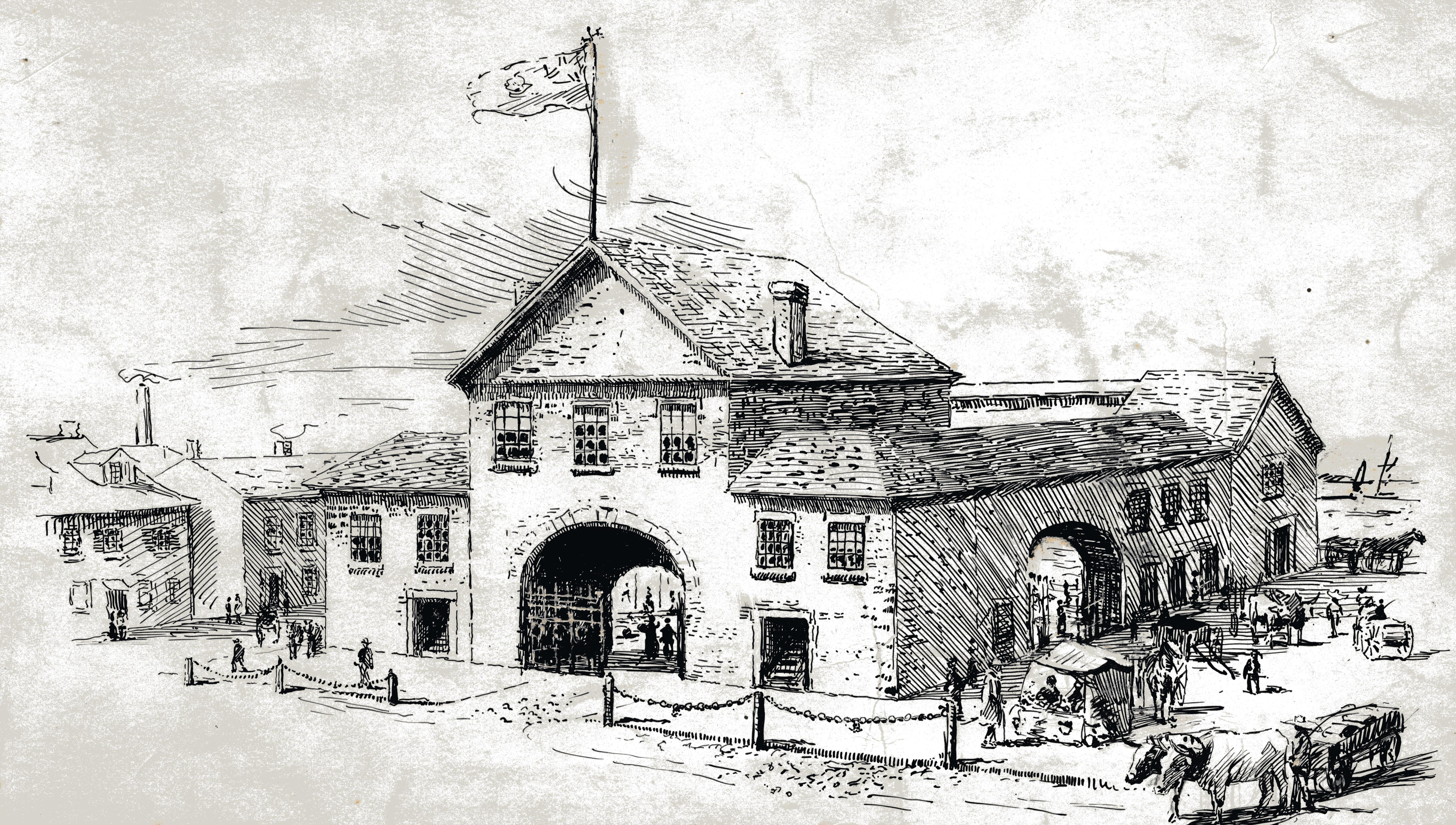
The Mechanics Institute in the Second Market building in York (Toronto)

In 1830, Lesslie worked with an English immigrant tenant, Joseph Bates, to found the York (Toronto) Mechanics Institute based on Bates' experience in London. Lesslie had experience with a similar "Rational Institution" in Dundee that he attended with Mackenzie in his youth. The London Mechanics Institute had been founded by a number of English trade unionists, such as William Thompson and Thomas Hodgskin, to provide adult education for the city's "mechanics" (artisans and journeymen). The Institute became the Toronto Public Library in 1883. The Mechanics' Institute had a difficult start due to opposition from the local elite, the Family Compact. Lesslie recorded in his diary that it was "viewed with suspicion by some of our Gentry & some of its professed & warmest friends seem to be influenced by them. - The intelligence of the lower Classes they and their system would if possible keep under. - their Lord and Slave system is not to be grafted upon the people of U.C.".

=== City Alderman ===
"Muddy York" was municipally governed by the Court of Quarter Sessions, composed of appointed magistrates; these men were part of the Family Compact. But the town's growth made the sheer volume of work impractical for a part-time body. In 1833, several prominent reformers petitioned the House to have the town incorporated (Upper Canada's first), which would also have made the position of magistrate elective. The Reformers' goal was a democratically accountable municipal government. The Tory-controlled House struggled to find a means of creating a legitimate electoral system which might, nonetheless, minimize the chances of Reformers being elected. The bill passed on March 6, 1834, and proposed two different property qualifications for voting; a higher one for the election of aldermen (who would also serve as magistrates), and a lower one for common councillors. Lesslie was elected an Alderman to the first city council. This council, in turn, elected William Lyon Mackenzie mayor, and made the Second Market Building their home.

=== Canadian Alliance Society ===
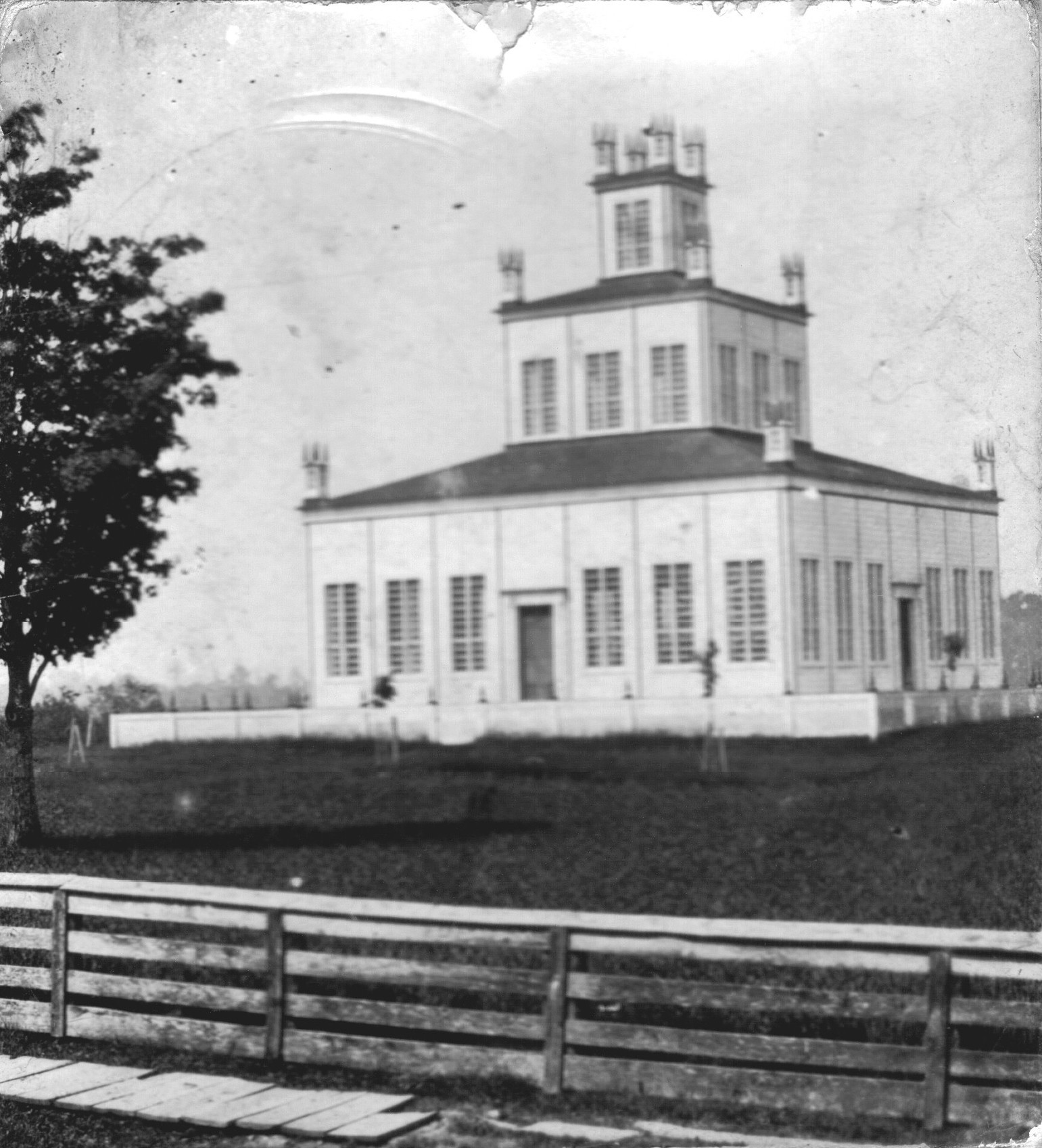
The Sharon Temple of the Children of Peace

Reformers in Upper Canada organized a "Grand Convention of Delegates" to nominate reform candidates for the election in 1834. They were very successful and all five reform candidates won, including Mackenzie. In January 1835, shortly after the elections, the reformers organized the Canadian Alliance Society. It was a Political Union designed to organize petition campaigns, not a political party. Lesslie was elected its president, and Timothy Parsons its secretary. These two were also leaders in the Toronto Mechanics Institute. The Canadian Alliance Society adopted much of the platform (such as secret ballot & universal suffrage) of the Owenite National Union of the Working Classes in London, England, that were to be integrated into the Chartist movement in England. The Canadian Alliance Society shared the same space in the Second Market Building as the Mechanics Institute and the Children of Peace, an active reform religious group from the village of Sharon, Ontario. The first petition campaign of the Canadian Alliance Society originated with the Children of Peace, and asked for a "Provincial Loan Office."

=== Bank of the People ===
The petitioning campaign for a "Provincial Loan Office" that would lend farmers small amounts was ultimately unsuccessful. However, Dr Charles Duncombe did establish the legality of unchartered joint-stock banks, which would allow the Reformers to establish their own bank over the opposition of the Family Compact. James Lesslie spearheaded the founding of the Bank of the People, serving as general manager and later president after John Rolph. The Bank of the People was the only bank in Upper Canada not to suspend payments during the financial panic of 1837–8. Many of the shareholders, however, took part in the Rebellion of 1837 and the Family Compact plotted to have it taken over by the Bank of Montreal in 1840.

=== Toronto House of Industry ===
In 1834, the United Kingdom passed a new Poor Law which created the system of Victorian workhouses (or "Houses of Industry") that Charles Dickens described in Oliver Twist. Sir Francis Bond Head, the new Lt. Governor of Upper Canada in 1836, had been a Poor Law administrator before his appointment. Fearing that Head wanted to introduce these workhouses in Toronto, a small group of reformers and dissenting ministers led by James Lesslie and Dr William W. Baldwin founded the Toronto House of Industry on alternate, humane principles. The Toronto House of Industry was started by the reformers in the ‘unused’ courthouse on Richmond Street in January 1837 where they had previously met as the "Canadian Alliance Society" of which Lesslie had been president. The Toronto House of Refuge and Industry appears to have been founded on the model of the Owenite Socialist "Home Colonies". A constant struggle between the ruling elite, the "Family Compact," and the Reformers to gain control of the institution prevented this plan from ever fully being implemented.

=== Rebellion & Mississippi Emigration Society ===
Although Lesslie appears to have taken no part in the Upper Canada Rebellion, he was arrested in December 1837; he was released two weeks later. He and other disappointed Reformers then formed the Mississippi Emigration Society which proposed to purchase a large block of land at Davenport, Iowa for the erection of a mill, other property to be held in common, and redistribution among shareholders. The organizers included Lesslie, Peter Perry, Francis Hincks, J. Hervey Price and Thomas Parke. Lesslie, Hincks and Price were all involved in the management of the Bank of the People, and were the designated agents for the company. They approached President van Buren in Washington to obtain a large grant in the Iowa territory. The committee had found significant obstacles to purchasing a large contiguous block of land; squatters’ had pre-emptive rights to the land they had settled, and competition from land sharks and speculators added to the problem. Interest in the Mississippi Land Company slowly eroded throughout 1839, and those interested in emigration did so with their own resources.

After hearing of possible changes following Lord Durham's assignment as governor general, Lesslie decided to remain in Upper Canada.

=== Clear Grits ===
In 1842, Lesslie took over the operation of the Toronto Examiner from Francis Hincks, with whom he had worked in the Bank of the People. After George Brown established The Globe in 1844, the Examiner began to take a more radical stance, later aligning itself with the Clear Grits. The paper lobbied for the abolition of the clergy reserves and the separation of church and state. In 1855, after a number of competing newspapers had been established, Lesslie sold the Examiner to George Brown.

Lesslie sold off his business interests around the same time. He served several terms as school trustee and also served as a justice of the peace.

He died in the village of Eglinton, now part of Toronto, in 1885.
