= House of industry =

A house of industry was a charitable institution established in the 18th and 19th centuries various cities in the British Empire under the Poor Law to offer relief to the destitute. Originally, these institutions took the form of workhouses which would forcibly lodge the poor and put them to work. Later, they would offer temporary and permanent lodging, food, fuel, and other assistance to the poor.

Examples include:

- House of Industry (Bulcamp)
- House of Industry (Dublin)
- Toronto House of Industry
