= Toronto House of Industry =

Coordinates: 43.6568°N 79.38615°W

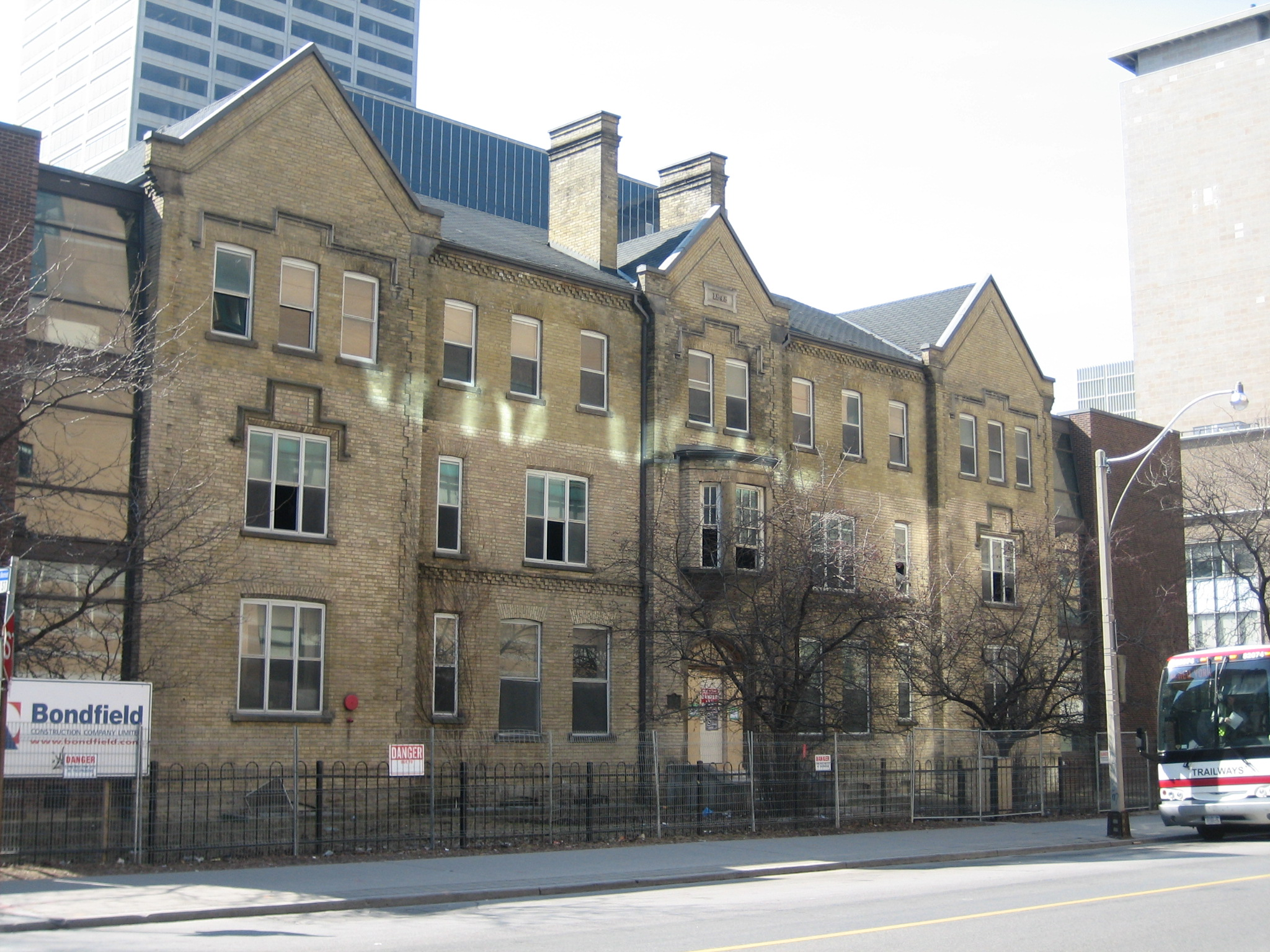
- The Toronto House of Industry building in 2009
- Interactive map of the Toronto House of Industry area

General information
- Opened: 1848

Design and construction
- Architect: William Thomas

In 1834, the United Kingdom passed a new Poor Law which created the system of Victorian workhouses (or "Houses of Industry") that Charles Dickens described in Oliver Twist. Sir Francis Bond Head, the new lieutenant-governor of Upper Canada in 1836, had been a Poor Law administrator before his appointment. Fearing that Head wanted to introduce these workhouses in Toronto, a small group of reformers and dissenting ministers led by publisher James Lesslie and Dr. William W. Baldwin founded the Toronto House of Industry on alternate, humane principles. The Toronto House of Industry was started by the reformers in the ‘unused’ courthouse on Richmond Street in January 1837 where they had previously met as the "Canadian Alliance Society" of which Lesslie had been president. The Toronto House of Refuge and Industry appears to have been founded on the model of the Owenite Socialist "Home Colonies". A constant struggle between the ruling elite, the "Family Compact", and the Reformers to gain control of the institution prevented this plan from ever fully being implemented.

In 1848, a building for the House of Industry was erected at the corner of Elm Street and Elizabeth Street, in the middle of the Toronto district known as The Ward, which housed a highly dense slum populated by successive waves of immigrants. Architect William Thomas won a competition to design the building. Thomas declined his commission and donated the plans. In 1899, a third storey was added, designed by E. J. Lennox in Thomas' style.

The House of Industry provided permanent and temporary lodging as well as food and fuel to the needy in the community, who often were required to do chores in return for help. It also assisted abandoned or orphaned children, often placing them as indentured servants in homes and farms in and around Toronto.

By 1947, the clients of Ontario's houses of industry were predominantly the elderly poor and the Toronto House of Industry building was converted into a home for the elderly and renamed Laughlen Lodge after Arthur and Frances Laughlen. When new senior citizens' housing was constructed 1975–83, in association with the Rotary Club of Toronto, the north section of the old House of Industry was preserved as part of the Rotary-Laughlen Centre.

== See also ==
- House of industry
