= House of Industry (Bulcamp) =

Workhouse in Suffolk, England

The House of Industry was a workhouse in Bulcamp, Blythburgh, Suffolk, England.

The construction was started in 1765 to the design of Thomas Fulcher of Debenham.

== See also ==
- House of industry
