= Bank of the People =

17th century bank in Upper Canada

- Type: Joint-Stock Bank
- Founder: James Lesslie
- Fate: Absorbed by Bank of Montreal
- Successor: Bank of Montreal
- Headquarters: Toronto, Upper Canada
- Key people: James Leslie, Dr John Rolph, Francis Hincks

The Bank of the People was created by radical Reform politicians James Lesslie, James Hervey Price, and Dr John Rolph in Toronto in 1835. It was founded after they failed to establish a "Provincial Loan Office" in which farmers could borrow small sums guaranteed by their land holdings. The Bank of the People was the only bank in Upper Canada not to suspend payments during the financial panic of 1837-8. Many of the shareholders, however, took part in the Rebellion of 1837 and the Family Compact plotted to have it taken over by the Bank of Montreal in 1840.

== Bank Wars 1835-1838 ==
=== Chartered vs Joint Stock Banks ===
Until 1835, every bank in Upper Canada required a legislated charter which established it as a legal person able to sue, and be sued at law. Only two Banks had been chartered: the Bank of Upper Canada and the Commercial Bank of the Midland District. Both banks were controlled by the "Family Compact" who used their control of the currency supply and credit to control trade and ultimately, the farmers. They had a "licensed monopoly" to print paper money, which reduced competition.

In 1835, Dr Charles Duncombe, a Reform politician in the Legislative Assembly, was part of a "Select Committee on Currency" that offered a template for the creation of joint stock banks based on several successful Scottish banks. The Scottish bank system had always differed from the English system. The difference between the English chartered banks and the Scottish joint stock banks lay almost entirely on the issue of stockholder liability and its implications for the issuance of bank notes. The joint stock banks lacked limited liability, hence every partner in the bank was responsible for the bank's debts to the full extent of their personal property. The chartered banks, in contrast, protected their shareholders with limited liability and hence from major loss; they thus encouraged speculation. The chartered banks would loan out many more banknotes (little more than bank issued I.O.U.s) than they had specie (legal tender) to exchange for those notes once redeemed. The more banknotes they loaned out the more interest they made, but at the increased risk of bankruptcy. Protected by limited liability, their shareholders put profit above risk.

The Scottish joint-stock banks, in contrast, followed a "hard money policy", whereby they would issue a banknote only if they had enough specie to cover it. They avoided speculative risk because if they failed, their shareholders were responsible for the full loss. Since the banks did not require a legislated charter, many more banks could be founded, and they were more competitive, thereby endangering the solvency of the speculative chartered banks.

=== The Bank of the People ===
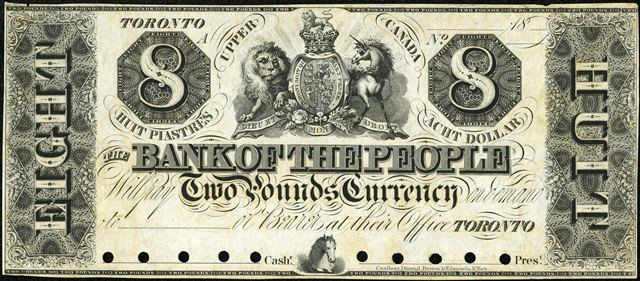
Eight dollar note issued by the Bank of the People

Dr. Duncombe's report opened the legal door for new banks to be founded. The Reformers' abandoned their attempt to establish a "Provincial Loan Fund" for farmers in the Legislative Assembly, and instead turned their efforts to creating a new joint-stock bank. The first bank to be proposed was the Farmer's Bank. However, in a bitter shareholder proxy battle, control of the bank was won by the Hon. John Elmsley Jr., a member of the Family Compact. He was one of the largest shareholders in the Bank of Upper Canada.

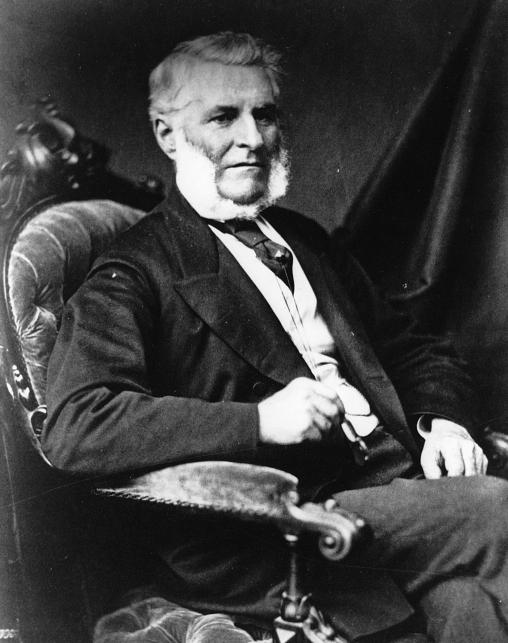
Sir Francis Hincks, Bank of the People Cashier and later premier of Canada West

William Lyon Mackenzie argued that the Bank of Upper Canada "served the double purpose of keeping the merchants in chains of debt and bonds to the bank manager, and the Farmer's acres under the harrow of the storekeeper. You will be shewn how to break this degraded yoke of mortgages, ejectments, judgments and bonds. Money bound you - money shall loose you" (Correspondent & Advocate 30-7-1835).

Inspired, the Reformers, led by James Lesslie, a prominent Toronto businessman and Reform city alderman, then founded the Bank of the People on Nov. 4, 1835, seeking to limit shareholders to known Reformers. Dr John Rolph was elected president, and James Lesslie the cashier (manager). Among its stockholders were David Willson and the Children of Peace who operated the first credit union in Canada in their village of Hope. Sir Francis Hincks, head cashier at the Farmer's Bank, later became cashier at the Bank of the People and Lesslie became president.

One loan from the bank stood out: they gave William Lyon Mackenzie £200 to found the Constitution newspaper on July 4, 1836 to organize the democratic reformers of Upper Canada.

The new bank was soon to prove its distinctiveness. Despite offering 5% interest on deposits, it was able to deliver a 6% dividend in 1837, in spite of paying off £1,200 in start-up costs. It managed to do this despite the general economic downturn, and without resorting to widespread litigation. The Bank was located in a house on New (Jarvis) Street owned by James Beaty, a reform city councillor.

During the financial panic of 1837-8, the Tory dominated Legislative Assembly banned all further joint-stock banks, even though it was the speculative chartered Bank of Upper Canada that was insolvent and required a government bailout. The Bank of the People survived the panic unscathed and without recourse to government protection.

The bank was purchased by the Bank of Montreal in 1840. Like the other Canadian chartered banks, it issued its own paper money. The Bank of Canada was established through the Bank of Canada Act of 1934 and the banks relinquished their right to issue their own currency.

=== Related Banks ===
The name selected by the reformers, the Bank of the People, reflects their emerging strong ties and shared strategies with reformers in Lower Canada, who were founding a similarly named bank in Montreal at the same time, in an effort to break the Bank of Montreal's monopoly there. La Banque du Peuple was formed under the title of Viger, Dewitt & Company, organized as a société en commandite, the French form of joint stock company. The Montreal bank's founders were Louis-Michel Viger, a Montreal lawyer and popular Patriote politician, and Jacob DeWitt, a wealthy American-born hardware merchant, ship owner and reform politician. They drew their clientele from among the French farmers and artisans.
