= Farmer's Joint Stock Bank =

- Company type: Joint stock company
- Industry: Banking
- Founded: 1835 in Toronto, Upper Canada
- Founders: George Truscott; John Cleveland Green
- Defunct: 1854
- Fate: Closed
- Key people: 1st President: Sir Francis Hincks

The Farmer's Joint Stock Bank was a bank that operated in Upper Canada, and later in the Province of Canada, from 1834 to 1854.

== History ==
Following the 1821 legalization of small notes and bills of exchange in Upper Canada, the Bank was formed in 1834 as a private bank by George Truscott and John Cleveland Green in Toronto, Upper Canada. Francis Hincks, a journalist and colonial administrator, was invited to become its first cashier. (Note: In essence, its first general manager.'"`UNIQ--ref-00000008-QINU`"') In 1835, it was taken over by a group of Reformers (Note: Truscott and Green, the original founders, had also started the undercapitalized Agricultural Bank'"`UNIQ--ref-0000000A-QINU`"') and constituted as a joint-stock company called the Farmers' Joint Stock Banking Company by deed of settlement. The first board of directors appointed John Elmsley, a member of the Family Compact, (Note: son of John Elmsley (1762-1805), and also a director of the Bank of Upper Canada until 1834'"`UNIQ--ref-0000000D-QINU`"') to be its first president, which forced Hincks and other Reform investors to leave and found the Bank of the People in December 1835. (Note: later becoming part of the Bank of Montreal) When Upper Canada moved in 1837 to restrict the ability of institutions other than incorporated banks to issue their own banknotes, the Bank was exempted.

A financial crisis that affected Upper Canada in 1837 resulted in a suspension of the Bank's activities for two months at the end of that year. In 1838, it was barred from issuing banknotes that were not payable on demand.

Economic conditions, together with poor management and political intrigue, led to a move by the board to wind up the Bank in January 1844, which was not completed until December 1848 with its sale to new owners. William Brown Phipps, who had been Manager since 1841, returned to become Manager of the revived Bank in March 1849. In June 1849, it flooded Toronto and Buffalo with new issues of its banknotes, which were subsequently boycotted by merchants. It was finally closed in 1854.

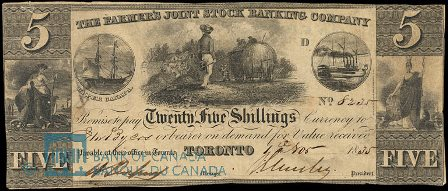
$5/25s. note, as valued under the Halifax rating, from 1835

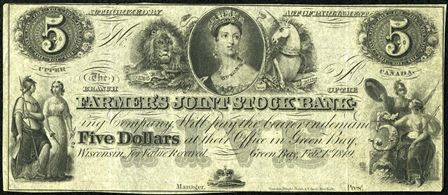
$5 note issued in 1849 from its Green Bay, Wisconsin office

== Sources ==
- "Deed of Settlement of the Farmers' Joint Stock Banking Company" (PDF). torontopubliclibrary.ca. 1835.
- Breckenridge, Roeliff Morton (1895). "The Canadian Banking System, 1817-1890". Publications of the American Economic Association. 10 (1). American Economic Association: 13–476. JSTOR 2560443.
- Ryan, Christopher D. (2004). "William Brown Phipps, Private Banker" (PDF). Canadian Revenue Newsletter (44). Canadian Revenue Study Group, British North America Philatelic Society: 2–3, 6. ISSN 1488-5255.
