= James Hervey Price =

Attorney and political figure in Canada West

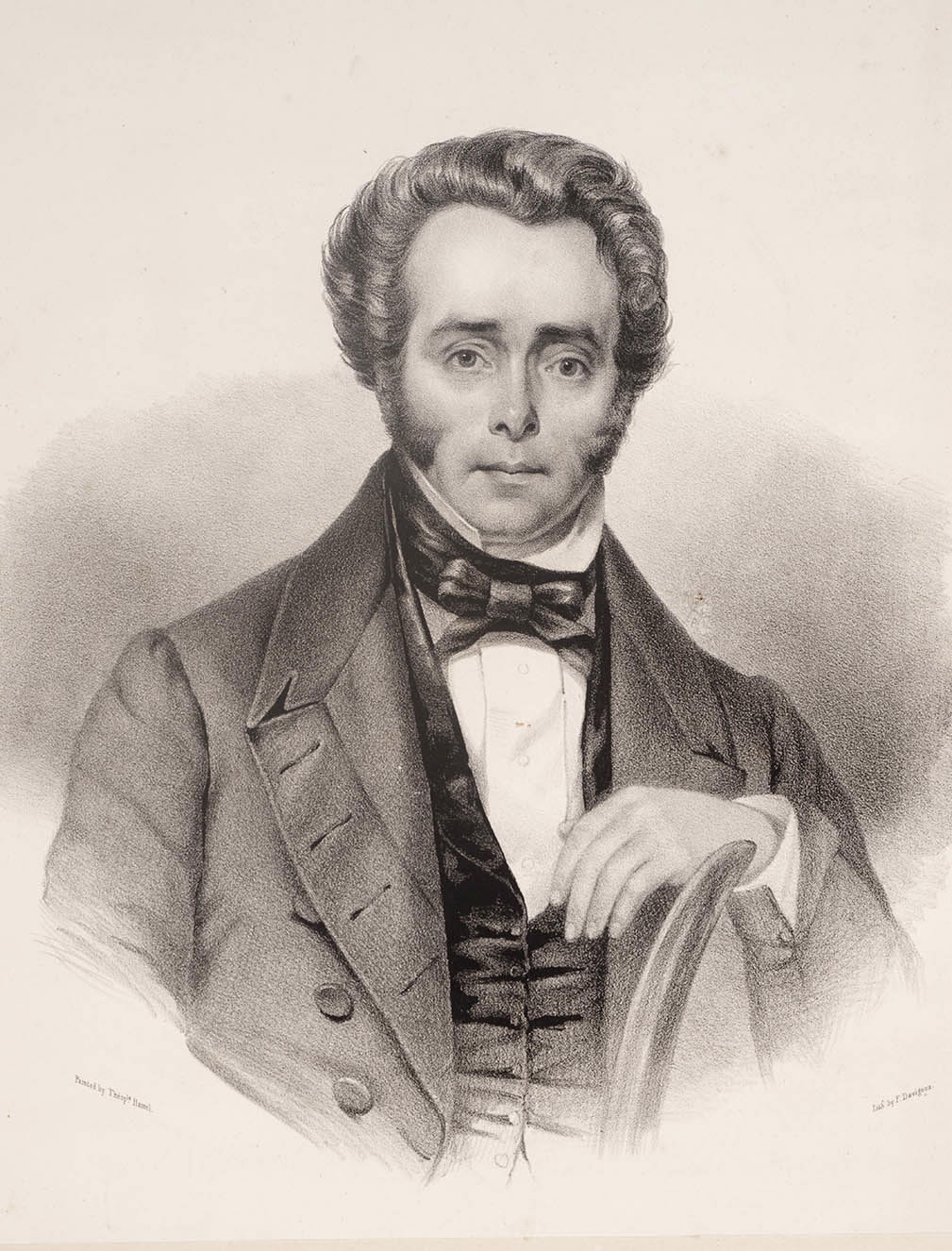

Member of the Legislative Assembly of the Province of Canada for York–1st
- In office 1841–1851
- Preceded by: New position

Personal details
- Born: 1797 Cumberland, England
- Died: 13 July 1882 (aged 84–85) Shirley, Southampton, England

James Hervey Price (1797 – 13 July 1882) was a Canadian attorney and political figure in Canada West. He was born and grew up in Cumberland, United Kingdom, and studied law at Doctors' Commons. He moved to Upper Canada in 1828 and became an attorney in 1833. He was appointed the city of Toronto's first city clerk in 1834 and the following year built a house north of Toronto that he named Castlefield. In 1836 he was elected as a city councillor for St. David's Ward in Toronto but was defeated the following year. Although he considered himself a Reformer, he did not participate in the Upper Canada Rebellion. In 1841 he was elected to the first Parliament of the Province of Canada, representing the 1st riding of York as a Reformer. He served as the commissioner of Crown lands from 1848 to 1851 when he was defeated in his reelection campaign for his seat in the Parliament. He withdrew from politics and worked as an attorney until his retirement in 1857. In 1860 he returned to Britain to Bath, and died in Shirley, Hampshire, in 1882.

== Early years ==
Price was born in Cumberland, in the north of England, in 1797 and studied law at Doctors' Commons in London. He married Elizabeth Anne Rubergall in his early 20s, sometime before 1822. They would have at least four children together. Their first son was born sometime before his arrival to Upper Canada.

== Immigration to York and municipal politics ==
Price immigrated to Upper Canada in 1828 with his wife, his son and his sister-in-law Mary Anne. He lived in Dundas and York while studying law with George Rolph and William Henry Draper. He was admitted to practice as an attorney in 1833 although never worked as a barrister.

He was appointed the first city clerk for Toronto on 3 April 1834, but resigned on 26 February 1835, after Reformers were defeated in that year's municipal elections. He helped create the Bank of the People in 1835 and served as its secretary and solicitor. That year he purchased 210 acres (85 ha) of land north of Toronto to build a house that resembled his childhood home and called it Castlefield. In 1836 he co-signed a loan with William Lyon Mackenzie to create the Constitution, Mackenzie's new Reform-aligned newspaper. That same year he met with the newly appointed Lieutenant Governor Francis Bond Head to petition for responsible government and legislative control of the appointment of members to the executive council. When Bond Head rejected their petition, Price contributed to funds to support Charles Duncombe's trip to the British Colonial Office to protest Bond Head's actions. He later spoke out against Duncombe's selection for the trip, believing leaders were giving the impression that Duncombe was chosen by reformers supporters and not the leadership. That same year Price was elected as a city councillor for Toronto from St. David's Ward. He was defeated in his reelection in 1837.

== Upper Canada Rebellion ==
Price supported the 1837 declaration by Toronto Reformers that protested the government structure of Upper Canada. He was uninvolved with the preparations of the Upper Canada Rebellion but his home was the site of a Reformers meeting on 4 December. When Reformers marched toward Toronto on 5 December William Botsford Jarvis asked Price to bring the Lieutenant-Governor's offer for a truce. Price refused, stating he did not want others to think he was joining the rebels and suggested Robert Baldwin or John Rolph be sent instead. It was rumoured that Mackenzie, upon the rebellion's defeat on 7 December, hid in a large crib in Price's kitchen while the cook asked officers not to wake the babies. He was arrested after the rebellion and jailed for 13 days while government officials searched his office for evidence of his involvement with the rebellion. He was forced to repay the loan for the Constitution because of Mackenzie's exodus to the US. In 1838 he co-founded the Mississippi Emigration Society which offered land in Iowa for Reformers who wanted to emigrate from Canada.

== Provincial politics ==
In 1841, he was elected to the Legislative Assembly of the Province of Canada for the 1st riding of York as a Reformer, defeating John William Gamble. He criticized Governor-General Charles Theophilus Metcalfe for ignoring the executive council's advice in making patronage appointments. In 1844 he sold his home to Franklin Jackes since he was spending most of his time at the Canadian legislature and was not living in Toronto. In March he joined the Reform Association to oppose Metcalfe's appointment of a Speaker of the House in the Canadian Parliament without consulting the executive council. Price was appointed commissioner of Crown lands from 20 April 1848, to 27 October 1851, in the Baldwin-LaFontaine government. During this time he proposed bills to eliminate clergy reserves but avoided representing the government in his proposals as a favour to his ally Robert Baldwin. He supported the Rebellion Losses Bill and upon its passage, his home in Montreal was attacked by a mob protesting the bill. In 1851, in his capacity as commissioner of Crown lands, he renamed the town of Saugeen in Canada West as Southampton, named after the British city of the same name.

In the 1851 election for the 4th Parliament of the Province of Canada, Price sought to be renominated as the Reform candidate for York South, but David Gibson was selected instead. Price continued his campaign but Mackenzie worked to unseat Price, accusing Price of betraying Reform values in order to secure political power. Price was defeated in the election by John William Gamble and blamed Reformers for his loss. He campaigned in the 1854 provincial election using Baldwin's policies but struggled to control his alcohol consumption, lost the campaign, and withdrew from politics.

== Later life and death ==
Price stopped practising law in 1857 and left Toronto in 1860 to live in Bath, England. He died in Shirley, near Southampton, England, on 13 July 1882.

== Political and religious views ==
Price was introduced to the Reform movement by Jesse Ketchum, who married his wife's sister Mary Anne. He wanted to dissolve the Province of Canada and believed Reformers should advocate for more independence from Britain so the Canadian provinces could govern their own affairs. In the Parliament of Canada, Price was aligned with Robert Baldwin and the moderate Reformers. He supported the creation of elective district councils to stop the violence at election polls but opposed measures that allowed the governor-general to appoint members to the councils.

Price was a congregationalist and attended service at Zion Church. He fought to stop the distribution of land to religious institutions as clergy reserves. Price was a voluntaryist and wanted state schools and universities to be secular.

== Works cited ==
- Cross, Michael S. (2012). A biography of Robert Baldwin : the morning-star of memory. Don Mills, Ontario: Oxford University Press. ISBN 978-0-19-544954-9.
- Gates, Lillian F. (1996). After the Rebellion: The Later Years of William Lyon Mackenzie. Dundurn Press. ISBN 978-1-55488-069-0.
- Godfrey, Charles (1993). John Rolph: Rebel with Causes. Madoc, Ontario: Condam Publishing. ISBN 0921453043.
- Rayburn, Alan (2010). Place names of Canada. Don Mills, Ontario: Oxford University Press. ISBN 978-0-19-543153-7.
- Schrauwers, Albert (2009). 'Union is Strength': W.L. Mackenzie, The Children of Peace and the Emergence of Joint Stock Democracy in Upper Canada. Toronto: University of Toronto Press. ISBN 978-1-4426-9327-2.
- Wilton, Carol (2000). Popular Politics and Political Culture in Upper Canada, 1800-1850. Kingston, Ont.: McGill-Queen's Press - MQUP. ISBN 978-0-7735-2053-0.
- Wise, Leonard A. (2000). Toronto street names: an illustrated guide to their origins. Willowdale, Ont.: Firefly Books. ISBN 978-1-55209-386-3.
