= Harold Adamson (police officer) =

Canadian police officer

Chief of the Metropolitan Toronto Police
- In office 1970–1980
- Preceded by: James Page Mackey
- Succeeded by: Jack Ackroyd

Personal details
- Born: 1921 Scarborough, Ontario, Canada
- Died: December 6, 2001 (Age 80) Toronto, Ontario, Canada

Harold Adamson (1921 – December 6, 2001) was a Canadian police officer, Chief of the Metropolitan Toronto Police in the 1970s. He served as a police officer for 41 years, until his retirement in 1980.

Adamson's first foray into law enforcement was at the age of 18 when he came across a burglar in his home and hit him with his Lunch box. He joined the Scarborough Police Department the next year, rising to the rank of Deputy Chief.

In 1953, he came to public attention when, as a police inspector, he investigated the disappearance of Scarborough teenager Marion McDowell, organizing what was then the largest manhunt in Toronto history for the missing girl. The case was never solved.

By 1956, the Scarborough Police Department was amalgamated with other Toronto-area police forces to become the Metropolitan Toronto Police in 1957. In 1970 he became the new force's third chief with the retirement of James Page Mackey.

The police force in the 1970s had to cope with a growing population, rising crime rate, and declining respect for authority. The Toronto Police faced public anger and charges of racism following the fatal shooting of Albert Johnson by a police officer in 1979. A royal commission under Justice Donald Morand investigated the police during his tenure and found acts of police brutality and police officers giving false testimony under oath.

Mel Lastman, mayor of the Metropolitan Toronto borough of North York in the 1970s, said that Adamson responded to complaints of "outlawed displays of bigotry on the force, instituted new procedures following the Morand report into allegations of police brutality and commissioned the Hickling Johnson Report on adapting to the future." Adamson also pushed to recruit more minorities, and oversaw changes such as improving officer training, and expanding work among youth in crime prevention.

On October 5, 2005, nine days before his 58th birthday, Adamson's son, retired Staff-Sergeant Edward William John "Eddie" Adamson, committed suicide, suffering from post-traumatic stress disorder as a result of his failed efforts to save a fellow officer during a hostage situation on March 14, 1980. In 2008, the Workplace Safety & Insurance Board declared officially his death was ruled a work-related injury. His family was informed in April 2017 that his name will be placed on the Police Service Honor Roll. Eddie's daughter, Julie, is a retired Staff Sergeant with York Regional Police.

Of being police chief, Adamson once said, "this is a job that will never give you a swelled head. I didn't accept it with any great degree of relish. It was very nice to be made chief of police, but I certainly knew I wasn't in for any picnic."
