= Toronto Police Service Youth in Policing Initiative =

Summer job program in Toronto, Canada

The Toronto Police Service's Youth In Policing Initiative (YIPI) is a program jointly created by Ontario's Ministry of Children and Youth Services, the Toronto Police Services Board and the Toronto Police Service. The summer job program looks to improve the relationship between young people in Toronto's priority neighbourhoods while offering employment and the opportunity for youth to attain and improve teamwork and life skills.

== Program background ==
Created in 2006 following Toronto's Summer of the Gun, in which 27 people living in and interacting around various inner-city communities were victims of gun violence between June and September 2005, the Youth in Policing Initiative was one of the programs that received a portion of the $210 million distributed for the creation of community and youth programs in the 13 priority neighborhoods by the governments of Ontario and Toronto. The initiative is a part of the “Summer Jobs for Youth” program created by Ontario's Ministry of Children and Youth Services provides up to 8 weeks of full-time summer employment for youth in a variety of areas. Beginning in July 2006, the YIPI began with and continues to employ 150 summer students who are required to wear business dress attire to promote a sense of professionalism while on the job during their employment for the months of July and August.

Applicants to the program must be legal to work in Canada, between the ages of 14 and 17, returning to school in September and residing in one of the identified priority neighbourhoods.

== Priority neighbourhoods ==
Toronto's 13 priority neighbourhoods include:

- Jane-Finch
- Jamestown
- Malvern
- Kingston-Galloway
- Lawrence Heights
- Steeles-L'Amoreaux
- Eglinton East-Kennedy Park
- Crescent Town
- Weston-Mt. Dennis
- Dorset Park
- Scarborough Village
- Flemingdon Park-Victoria Village
- Westminster-Branson

The neighbourhoods were first classified as being in great need of social programs in Poverty by Postal Code, a report authored by the United Way in 2001 which categorized the communities according to the availability of key services such as community centres and employment services as well as the median household income, household education levels and the average household of knowledge of either English or French. Oftentimes, in addition to these attributes, the communities are claimed by local gangs such as the Five Point Generals who are based out of the Weston-Mt. Dennis area.

== Program details ==
In fostering the construction of positive and lasting relationships between the often marginalized youth and police officers who are often mistrusted by these communities, students, who are referred to as “Yipis” are stationed at the majority of the 17 Toronto Police divisions spread across the Greater Toronto Area including the Marine and Mounted units and the College St. headquarters. Along with administrative work, Yipis are often also responsible for organizing and participating in community initiatives that help to promote a more positive understanding of the Toronto Police Service and its members. During the first week and periodically throughout the 6 week program, all of the YIPI students report to headquarters to attend workshops and presentations facilitated by employment service groups, police officers and guest speakers.

Leadership is encouraged in all aspects of the program with students conducting and leading tours of their respective divisions for other YIPI students, creating online public service announcements, publications and commercials in the Media department, running summer camps with local divisions and creating and distributing a bi-weekly newsletter chronicling the activities of YIPI students. YIPI students are also given the opportunity to work with outside organizations such as the Toronto Blue Jays and the Toronto Community Housing Corporation who use YIPI students in volunteer positions for their Rookie Ball program. At the end of each summer session, surveys are conducted with YIPI students to gauge the impact of the program and its overall utility. Although students are limited to work for one session with the police, they can apply to be YIPI mentors for future sessions.
