= John Chisholm (police officer) =

Canadian police chief (c.1896–1958)

Chief of the Metropolitan Toronto Police
- In office 1957–1958
- Preceded by: Position established
- Succeeded by: James Page Mackey

Chief Constable of the Toronto Police Department
- In office 1946–1957
- Preceded by: Dennis Draper
- Succeeded by: Position merged

Personal details
- Born: c. 1896 Dundee, Scotland
- Died: July 4, 1958 High Park, Toronto, Canada
- Spouse: Vera May Phillips
- Occupation: Police officer

John C. "Jock" Chisholm (c. 1896 – July 4, 1958) was the first chief constable of the Toronto Police Department and Metropolitan Toronto Police Force until his death in 1958. Chisholm was the first Toronto chief to be appointed with policing experience.

Chisholm's father was a lay preacher in Dundee City Prison when John was growing up, giving him an interest in criminology. He was educated at the High School of Dundee.

== Career ==
He served in World War I with the artillery in Mesopotamia (modern Iraq) and, after the war, decided to enter policing. After finding no openings with the Hong Kong Police, he came to Canada where he joined the Toronto Police Department in 1920 he became an acting detective in three years, skipped a rank, to become detective sergeant in 1930 and went on to become the youngest inspector and then youngest deputy chief in the department's history in 1945 before becoming chief constable on the City of Toronto Police Department in January 1946.

Chisholm was found dead in his automobile in High Park having killed himself by a single shotgun wound to the head. He had been suffering from ill health since the previous Christmas - Police Commission Chairman C. O. Bick told the Daily Star that his "nerves" were bad, and had been rumoured for several weeks to be considering submitting his resignation. He had also been in severe pain for several months since suffering a fall.

The Metropolitan Toronto Police Force had been created in 1957 by the merger of 13 police forces with Chisholm, who had led the Toronto Police Force as Chief Constable since 1946, put in charge of the new, much larger, organization as Chief of Police.

Chisholm had often clashed with Bick, the first chairman of the new Metropolitan Toronto Police Commission, particularly over questions of authority. Bick asserted that "under the Police Act, the control of the police department is in the hands of the commission", not the chief. Chisolm was unable to cope with the strain of managing the merging of thirteen separate police departments and this is thought to have led to his suicide.
