= Jack Ackroyd =

Canadian law enforcement official (1925–1992)

Chief of the Metropolitan Toronto Police
- In office 1980–1984
- Preceded by: Harold Adamson
- Succeeded by: Jack Marks

Head of the Liquor Control Board of Ontario
- In office 1984–1991
- Preceded by: George Kitching
- Succeeded by: Andy Brandt

Personal details
- Born: 1925
- Died: September 29, 1992 (aged 66–67) Toronto, Ontario, Canada
- Spouse: Ethelyn Elizabeth "Lyn" (née Brown) Ackroyd
- Children: Karen, Vivyan, Earl (1st marriage); Lynda, Kevin (step-children)

John Wesley Ackroyd (1925 – September 29, 1992) was a prominent Canadian Chief of Police and high level Ontario civil servant. He served as the chief of the Metro Toronto Police Force from 1980 to 1984. Known as an ideas man, and 'kind cop' he introduced community policing when he was the deputy chief. Though later, during his term as the chief, the biggest mass civilian arrest since the Second World War occurred in Toronto's Gay district. Following his retirement from the police force, he was head of the Liquor Control Board of Ontario from 1984 to 1990, where he modernized the retail operations and its marketing.

== Policing career ==
Jack Ackroyd joined the Toronto Police Department as a cadet, in 1941. He rose through the ranks and by the mid 1970s, he was a deputy police chief. During this period he earned the nickname "Kojak", after the 1970s TV show and character Kojak. One of his biggest accomplishments was introducing "community policing" to the Metro force in the late 1970s. This so-called "more humane" style of policing was lauded by the media and politicians alike. Ackroyd will be remembered for this major innovation and for the following dark incidents that occurred on his watch.

=== 1977 Yonge Street clean-up ===
During the spring and summer of 1977, Toronto's city and metro councils were under pressure to do something about the sex trade and sex shops that were housed in the area along Yonge street from Queen to Bloor streets following the death of the twelve-year-old shoe-shine boy, Emanuel Jaques. The crisis was more political than real; nevertheless, under pressure from Toronto mayor David Crombie, Ackroyd had to plan and implement a neighbourhood sweep on the scale of the 1968 Yorkville sweep. Like in the Yorkville "crisis", Yonge street did not pose a major policing problem. The police were not raising a fuss for something to be done, it was the politicians, this time led by Crombie. Another factor driving this sweep was economic, as the newly opened Eaton Centre did not want this 'riff-raff' near its business establishment. So, over the course of a few months, Ackroyd – following the political directives issued by city council and the provincial government – ordered his officers to step up their patrols on this commercial strip and forced the closure of many shops and arrested prostitutes and their clients.

=== 1981 Bathhouse raids ===
Jack Ackroyd became the Metro Force's Chief of Police in 1980 following the tenure of Harold Adamson (police chief). Again political – not policing – concerns overshadowed how the Gay Community around the Church and Wellesly area should be monitored. During Ackroyd's first year as the chief, there was both a municipal election in November 1980, and a provincial one in March 1981.

Ackroyd, in an interview with the Toronto Star, talked about how police officers should act professionally, despite their personal prejudices:

We can't force people to give up their prejudices or their biases, not even policemen. But a cop has to be prepared to be professional. ...I might have some personal prejudices about the lifestyle choice of homosexuals, but that cannot enter into my work. Legally and morally, they are entitled to the protection of the police department.

A few days later on February 5, 1981, under his reign as police chief, one of Canada's largest civilian round-ups occurred in the city's gay ghetto. It was the infamous "Bathhouse raids" and as the CBC reported "the largest mass arrest in Canada since the October Crisis of 1970." 286 people were arrested, and Ackroyd defended it by the fact that there were several criminal code violations and that he "...as Chief, have no other course of action but to go along with the direction of the Crown Attorney."

Large protests followed these raids, and the raids became a rallying symbol for the Gay community. Because the raids took place in the middle of a provincial election, it was seen by many observers including the Toronto Star, that the raids were politically motivated to help the ruling Conservative government gain a majority. His career was an interesting dichotomy of progressive reform with the community-based policing approach, as well as accusations that the police force became an instrument for political advantage as seen in his handling of the policing of the Gay community.

== Post Police Chief career ==
=== Head of the LCBO ===
At the age of 58, Jack Ackroyd made a career change: he became an Ontario Civil Servant, by accepting the position of vice-chairman of the LCBO. In quick succession, he became the chairman of the public sector corporation, and immediately set about reforming it. Under his watch, the LCBO launched Project Image, which improved the retail end of its operations in many ways. He was responsible for ordering the redesign of the board's logo – which was in use until the early 2000s – to a burgundy and gold design. To improve the image of the retail locations, he made sure that newly designed uniforms were issued to sales staff. In an effort to bring more modern in-store marketing techniques, he authorized store managers to mount discreet product displays. General marketing outside the retail locations was modernized to include bus shelter posters and other forms of advertising. Ackroyd also made the visibility of the higher quality Vintages stores more known and important. His term as the LCBO's chairman can be summarized as bringing the board from a Prohibition-era government substance control agency, to a modern, customer-friendly corporation that made billions of dollars for the Ontario Government.

Ackroyd hadn't completely abandoned his policing background during this time though. He made sure his policing legacy would endure by donating the funds for an "academic excellence in police related studies" prize, administered by the Canadian Association of Chiefs of Police Research Foundation.

=== Sickness and death ===
Ackroyd spent many months confined to a hospital bed due to a blood illness. He died in the early morning hours of September 30, 1992 at Toronto General Hospital from long-term complications due to the blood disorder. His funeral was held on October 3, 1992, at Timothy Eaton Memorial Church, a house of worship accustomed to holding the city's notable funeral services.

An official tribute, on the floor of the Ontario Legislature, by Bob Runciman, the MPP for Leeds—Grenville, stated that "Jack Ackroyd set an example that continues to be the goal of Metro's men and women in blue. While he will be sadly missed by us all, there is comfort in knowing that his style and professional manner will be with us for many years to come."
