= Dennis Draper =

Brigadier-General Dennis Draper CMG DSO*

Chief Constable of the Toronto Police Department
- In office 1928–1946
- Preceded by: Samuel Dickson
- Succeeded by: John Chisholm

Personal details
- Born: February 20, 1875 Sutton, Quebec, Canada
- Died: November 8, 1951 (aged 76) Toronto, Ontario, Canada
- Party: Conservative
- Occupation: Military officer; police officer

Brigadier-General Dennis Colburn Draper CMG DSO* (February 20, 1875 – November 8, 1951) was a Canadian officer who served as the chief constable of the Toronto Police Department from 1928 to 1946.

== Early life ==
Draper was born and raised in Sutton in the Brome region of Quebec. He studied law at McGill University but dropped out before completing his studies in order to accept a position with the International Paper Company in Quebec.

== Military career ==
Active in the Canadian Militia prior to 1914, when World War I broke out, he enlisted with the 5th Canadian Mounted Rifles and went overseas with the rank of major. He received a field promotion to lieutenant colonel in 1918 and made commanding officer of the unit and was subsequently promoted to brigadier general and put in command of the 8th Canadian Infantry Brigade.

During the war, Draper received a Distinguished Service Order for gallantry at the Battle of Mount Sorrel and the Bar to his D.S.O. for his conduct at the Battle of Passchendaele. He was also decorated at the Battle of Arras and the Battle of Amiens. He was appointed a Companion of the Order of St Michael and St George in the 1919 New Year Honours, for services rendered in connection with military operations in France and Flanders.

== Political candidate ==
In the 1917 federal election, Draper was the governing Conservative Party's candidate in Brome and lost by less than 500 votes.

== Police Chief ==
A retired Brigadier-General in the Canadian Army with no background in police work as well as a failed Conservative candidate, Draper was brought to Toronto because the police commission believed they needed a strict disciplinarian to reorganize the force along military lines. They approached the Defence Department which recommended Draper, who after the war was working for the Abitibi Power and Paper Company. Mayor Sam McBride opposed Draper's appointment arguing that the new chief should be promoted from within the force.

At the time, the police department was dominated by cliques and promotion was a matter of fraternal connections with the Orange Order and Masonic Order as well as personal friendships. Draper is credited with breaking up that culture. However, his ignorance of police work and police methods was resented within the force as was his disciplinarianism which, at one point, led to police constables holding a strike vote.

Draper was also criticised for a series of scandals. In 1933, he ordered a drunk driving charge against the son of a federal Conservative cabinet minister withdrawn. This resulted in demands from Toronto City Council that he resign but Draper survived with support from the federal Conservative government. Several years later, Draper himself was charged with dangerous driving in 1941 following an incident in which four people were injured near Cobourg, Ontario, which again elicited cries for his dismissal.

However, Draper won the support of the city's business community and political elite by using the police force to break strikes and disrupt left-wing groups. Draper is best remembered for organizing a Red Squad within the police department to suppress strikes and left wing meetings, political rallies and demonstrations in the 1930s. The Red Squad targeted the Communist Party of Canada, socialists and the Co-operative Commonwealth Federation as well as trade unions and demonstrations of the unemployed during the Great Depression. Radical public meetings held weekly on the front lawn of Queen's Park were dispersed by Toronto police officers on horseback, nicknamed "Draper's Dragoons", often personally led by Draper himself. The police would charge into the crowd and beat people over the head with truncheons.

In 1933, under Draper's command, the police attempted to disrupt open air meetings of the Toronto Central Unemployed Council climaxing in a face off at Toronto's Allan Gardens on August 15 where police tried to stop a crowd of 2000 from gathering to hear speeches. When they failed, officers on motorcycles encircled the crowd, pointing their exhaust pipes inward towards the gathered open air meeting in order to project a fog of exhaust which the Toronto Daily Star compared to a poison gas attack during World War I. The demonstrators, many of whom were war veterans, battled with police for two hours. The Police Commission subsequently ordered Draper to restrain his men from interfering with public meetings unless a law had actually been broken.

Conversely, Draper did little to stop the 1933 Riot at Christie Pits two days later in which youth members of local Swastika clubs battled Jewish youth for more than four hours. Police Chief Dennis Draper was asked why there were only two policemen at the park that day when there had been prior indications of trouble and the fact that two nights before, in contrast with his force's sending dozens of police on horseback and motorcycle to disrupt the left wing meeting at Allan Gardens. Draper dismissed the riot, saying that "Hebrew people arrived and caused trouble."

Suspicious of "foreigners", Draper lobbied the City of Toronto to pass legislation banning public speeches in languages other than English, particularly Yiddish, curtailing union organization among Toronto's vast immigrant populations working in sweat shops.

Draper resigned as chief on January 18, 1946, at what was reported to be the age of 72, (this was disputed by the Mayor, an opponent of Draper, who claimed that since Draper gave his age at 58 when he was hired in 1928, he was actually 76 in 1946), following a general housecleaning of the police department and the encouraged retirement of a number of long serving officers by the police commission. Not eligible for a pension as he had never been a frontline officer, he was persuaded to resign with an offer that the department would continue to pay him a salary of $2,000 for at least five years to act as a "consultant".
