= Jack Marks (police officer) =

Canadian police officer (1927-2007)

Chief of the Metropolitan Toronto Police
- In office 1 July 1984 – 1 October 1989
- Preceded by: Jack Ackroyd
- Succeeded by: William J. McCormack

Personal details
- Born: February 11, 1927 Toronto, Ontario, Canada
- Died: February 27, 2007 (aged 80) Pickering, Ontario, Canada

Jack Marks (February 11, 1927 – February 27, 2007) was a Canadian police officer.

Marks was born in Toronto and became a Toronto police officer in 1951 after military service (Royal Canadian Artillery) and a career as an electrician. Marks was working a night shift on December 31, 1956, when police forces across the city united to become one. He rose through the ranks and was Deputy Chief of Field Operations before becoming Chief of Police. He served as chief of the Metro Toronto Police from 1984 to 1989 succeeding Jack Ackroyd. Marks was at police headquarters again on January 1, 2007, despite his illness, for the force's 50th anniversary.

Marks helped mould the force's commitment to building community and fostering diversity.

He died from peritoneal mesothelioma, a disease caused by exposure to asbestos, at the age of 80 in 2007.
