= James Page Mackey =

Chief of the Metropolitan Toronto Police
- In office 1958–1970
- Preceded by: John Chisholm
- Succeeded by: Harold Adamson

Chairman of the Liquor Licensing Board of Ontario
- In office 1970–1975

Personal details
- Born: May 27, 1913 Toronto, Ontario
- Died: February 27, 2009 (aged 95) Bracebridge, Ontario
- Spouse: Anne (Wilen) Mackey

James Page Mackey (May 27, 1913 – February 27, 2009) was chief of the Metropolitan Toronto Police from 1958 to 1970 and the longest-serving Toronto police chief since the creation of the amalgamated police force in 1957.

Mackey graduated from high school in Scarborough, Ontario and thought of becoming a chemist or builder but, with work difficult to find during the Great Depression he found employment as a milkman when Toronto police sergeant Michael Byrt said to the young Mackey, "Lad, why don't you join the force? It's a good job and good jobs are hard to find these days."

Mackey joined the original Toronto Police Department in 1936, "Jim was the 20th of 20 men taken on," his wife, Anne, later recalled. "We were very happy."

He went on a leave of absence during World War II to serve in the Royal Canadian Air Force and returned to the department after the war. He walked the beat, then became a detective and rose to the rank of junior inspector when, in 1958, he skipped two ranks to be appointed to be chief of police of the newly created Metropolitan Toronto Police following the suicide of Chief John Chisholm. The newly expanded department of 2,300 officers and civilians had been created the year before due to the amalgamation of the original Toronto Police Department with twelve suburban police departments.

In the 1960s, he was successful in stopping mobsters from Buffalo, New York from establishing a foothold in Toronto.

He served as chief for 12 years before retiring in 1970. He was then Chairman of the Liquor Licensing Board of Ontario until 1975. His autobiography, I Policed Toronto, was published in 1985.

Mackey retired to Bracebridge, Ontario where he died at the age of 95.
