= Toronto Police Service =

Police agency in Ontario, Canada

- Motto: To Serve and Protect

Agency overview
- Formed: 1834; 192 years ago
- Employees: 7,500 (5,500 police officers)
- Annual budget: CA$1.16 billion (2023)

Jurisdictional structure
- Governing body: Toronto Police Services Board
- Constituting instrument: Community Safety and Policing Act, 2019 (S.O. 2019, c. 1, Sched. 1)

Operational structure
- Headquarters: 40 College Street; Toronto, Ontario; M5G 2J3 43.66154976929422°N 79.3852548525375°W
- Sworn members: 4,870
- Unsworn members: 2,230
- Elected officer responsible: Michael Kerzner, Solicitor General of Ontario
- Agency executive: Myron Demkiw, Chief of Police
- Parent agency: City of Toronto
- Units: List: Business & Intelligence; Aviation; Crime Scene; Emergency Task Force; Highway Patrol; Communications; Primary Report Intake, Management and Entry (PRIME); Court Services; Fleet & Materials Management; Organized Crime Control Command; Integrated Gun & Gang Task Force; Provincial ROPE; Specialized Criminal Investigations; Organized Crime Enforcement; School Safety; Transit Bureau; Transportation Bureau
- Divisions: List: 11 Division; 12 Division; 13 Division; 14 Division; 22 Division; 23 Division; 31 Division; 32 Division; 33 Division; 41 Division; 42 Division; 43 Division; 51 Division; 52 Division; 53 Division; 55 Division

Facilities
- Commands: 16 Divisions; 12 Transit Districts; 10 Housing Police Service Areas
- Police cars: 1,687 (2015)
- Police boats: 23 (2015)
- Dogs: 35 German Shepherds; 7 Labrador Retrievers
- Horses: 26

Website
- www.tps.ca

The Toronto Police Service (TPS) is a municipal police force in Toronto, Ontario, Canada, and the primary agency responsible for providing law enforcement and policing services in Toronto. Established in 1834, it was the first local police service created in North America and is one of the oldest police services in the English-speaking world.

It is the largest municipal police service in Canada, and the fourth largest police force in Canada after Ontario Provincial Police (OPP), Sûreté du Québec (SQ), and the Royal Canadian Mounted Police (RCMP). With a 2023 budget of $1.16 billion, the Toronto Police Service ranks as the second largest expense of the City of Toronto's annual operating budget, after the Toronto Transit Commission (TTC).

== History ==
=== 19th century ===
The City of Glasgow Police (c.1800, merged to form Strathclyde Police in 1975) and London Metropolitan Police (1829) were the first modern municipal police departments, but the Toronto Police is older than the New York City Police Department (1845), and Boston Police Department (1839). It is the second-oldest continuously operating municipal police force in the world.

The Toronto Police Service was founded in 1834 as Toronto Police Force or sometimes as Toronto Police Department, when the city of Toronto was first created from the town of York. Before that, local able-bodied male citizens were required to report for night duty as special constables for a fixed number of nights per year on penalty of fine or imprisonment, in a system known as "watch and ward".

In 1835, Toronto retained five full-time constables—a ratio of about one officer for every 1,850 citizens. Their daily pay was set at 5 shillings for day duty and 7 shillings, 6 pence, for night duty.

In 1837, the constables’ annual pay was fixed at £75 per annum, a lucrative city position when compared to the mayor's annual pay of £250 at the time. Although constables were issued uniforms in 1837, one contemporary recalled that the Toronto Police was "without uniformity, except in one respect—they were uniformly slovenly." A provincial government report in 1841 described the Toronto Police as "formidable engines of oppression".

==== 1845 to 1859 ====
By 1848, the Catholic population in Toronto rose to 25 percent. Toronto constables on numerous occasions suppressed opposition candidate meetings and took sides during bitter sectarian violence between Orange Order and Irish Catholic radical factions in the city.

==== Toronto circus riot ====
On the night of Thursday, 12 July 1855, S. B. Howes' Star Troupe Menagerie & Circus clowns, and Hook and Ladder Firefighting Company volunteers patronized the bordello of Mary Ann Armstrong on King Street near Jarvis Street, a fight got started, with the firefighters retreating. The next day, Friday, 13 July 1855, a crowd gathered at the Fair Green, a grassy space on the waterfront where the circus had pitched their tents (now, south-east corner of Front & Berkeley), threw stones and insults, and demanded that a clown named Meyers be handed over. Circus wagons were burned, the fire bell was rung, yet when Hook and Ladder Firefighting Company arrived, they joined the riot. The militia later arrived, called in by the mayor, and defused the riot.

After public outrage at the police's failure to prosecute, an inquiry and an election led to mass firings and selective rehirings in 1859.

==== 1859 to 1900 ====
The new force was removed from Toronto City Council jurisdiction (except for the setting of the annual budget and manpower levels) and placed under the control of a provincially mandated board of police commissioners. Under its new chief, former infantry captain William Stratton Prince, standardized training, hiring practices, and new strict rules of discipline and professional conduct were introduced. Today's Toronto Police Service directly traces its ethos, constitutional lineage, and Police Commission regulatory structure to the 1859 reforms.

In the 19th century, the Toronto Police mostly focused on the suppression of rebellion in the city, particularly during the Fenian threats of 1860 to 1870. The Toronto Police were probably Canada's first security intelligence agency when they established a network of spies and informants throughout Canada West in 1864 to combat US Army recruiting agents attempting to induce British Army soldiers stationed in Canada for deserting to serve in the Union Army in the Civil War. The Toronto Police operatives later turned to spy on the activities of the Fenians and filed reports to the Chief Constable from as far as Buffalo, Detroit, Chicago and New York City. In December 1864, the Canada West secret frontier police was established under Stipendiary Magistrate Gilbert McMicken, and some of the Toronto Police agents were reassigned to this new agency.

In 1863, Toronto police officers were also used as "Indian fighters" during the Manitoulin Island Incident, when some fifty natives armed with knives forced the fishery inspector William Gibbard and a fishery operation to withdraw from unceded tribal lands on Lake Huron. Thirteen armed Toronto police officers, along with constables from Barrie, were dispatched to Manitoulin Island to assist the government in retaking the fishery operation, but were forced back when the natives advanced, now armed with rifles. The police withdrew but were later reinforced and eventually arrested the entire band, but not before William Gibbard was killed by unknown parties.

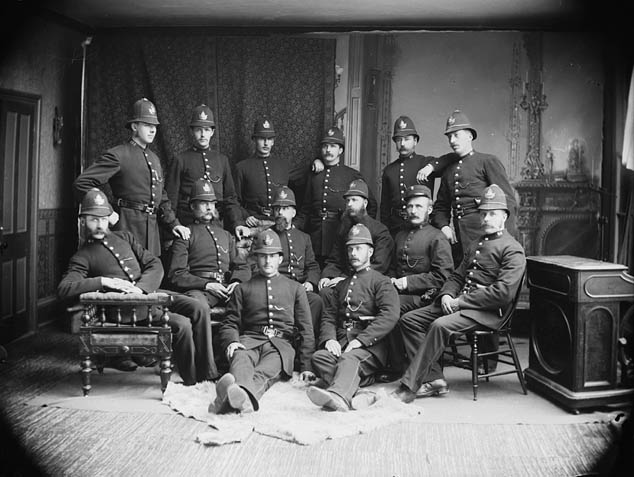
Constables of the Toronto Police Department, 1883

In the 1870s, as the Fenian threat began to gradually wane and the Victorian moral reform movement gained momentum, Toronto police primarily functioned in the role of "urban missionaries" whose function it was to regulate unruly and immoral behavior among the "lower classes". They were almost entirely focused on arresting drunks, prostitutes, disorderlies, and violators of Toronto's ultra-strict Sunday "blue law"

In the days before public social services, the force functioned as a social services mega-agency. Before the creation of the Toronto Humane Society in 1887 and the Children's Aid Society in 1891, the police oversaw animal and child welfare, including the enforcement of child support payments. They operated the city's ambulance service and acted as the board of health. Police stations at the time were designed with space for the housing of homeless, as no other public agency in Toronto dealt with this problem. Shortly before the Great Depression, in 1925, the Toronto Police housed 16,500 homeless people. The Toronto Police regulated street-level businesses: cab drivers, street vendors, corner grocers, tradesmen, rag men, junk dealers, and laundry operators. Under public order provisions, the Toronto Police were responsible for the licensing and regulation of dance halls, pool halls, theaters, and, later, movie houses. It was responsible for censoring the content of not only theatrical performances and movies but also of all literature in the city, ranging from books and magazines to posters and advertising. The Toronto Police also suppressed labour movements, which were perceived as anarchist threats. The establishment of the mounted unit is directly related to the four-month Toronto streetcar strike of 1886, when authorities called on the Governor General's Horse Guard Regiment to assist in suppressing the strike.

=== 20th century ===
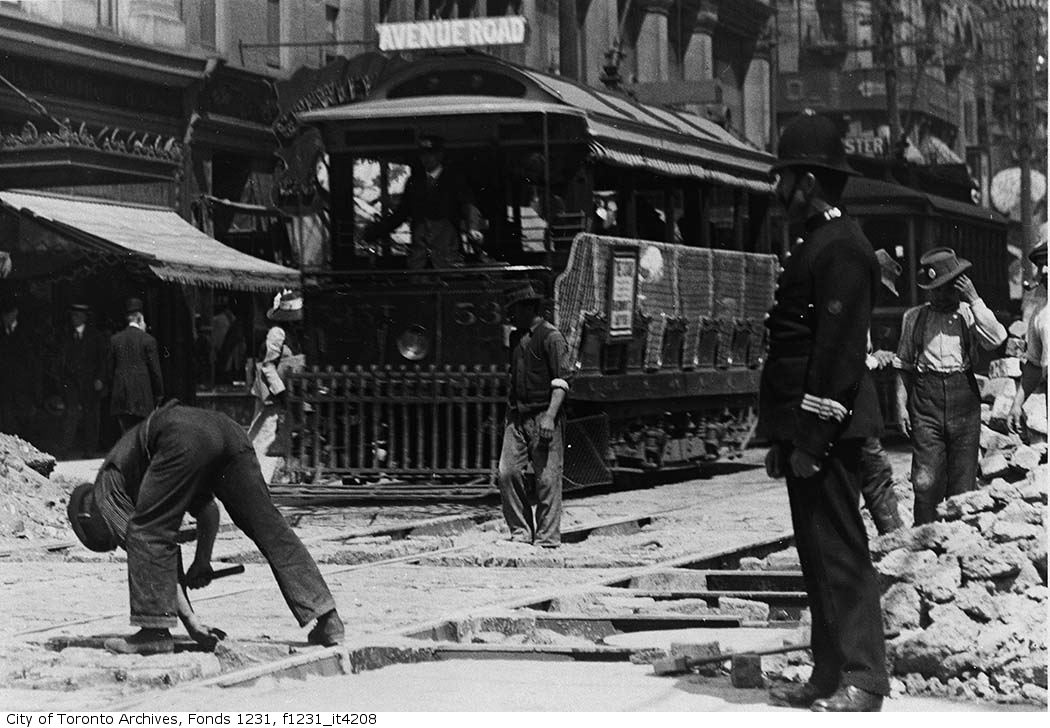
A constable overlooks construction on Adelaide and Yonge Street, 1911.

As for serious criminal investigations, the Toronto Police frequently (but not always) contracted with private investigators from the Pinkerton's Detective Agency until the 20th century, when it developed its own internal investigation and intelligence capacity.

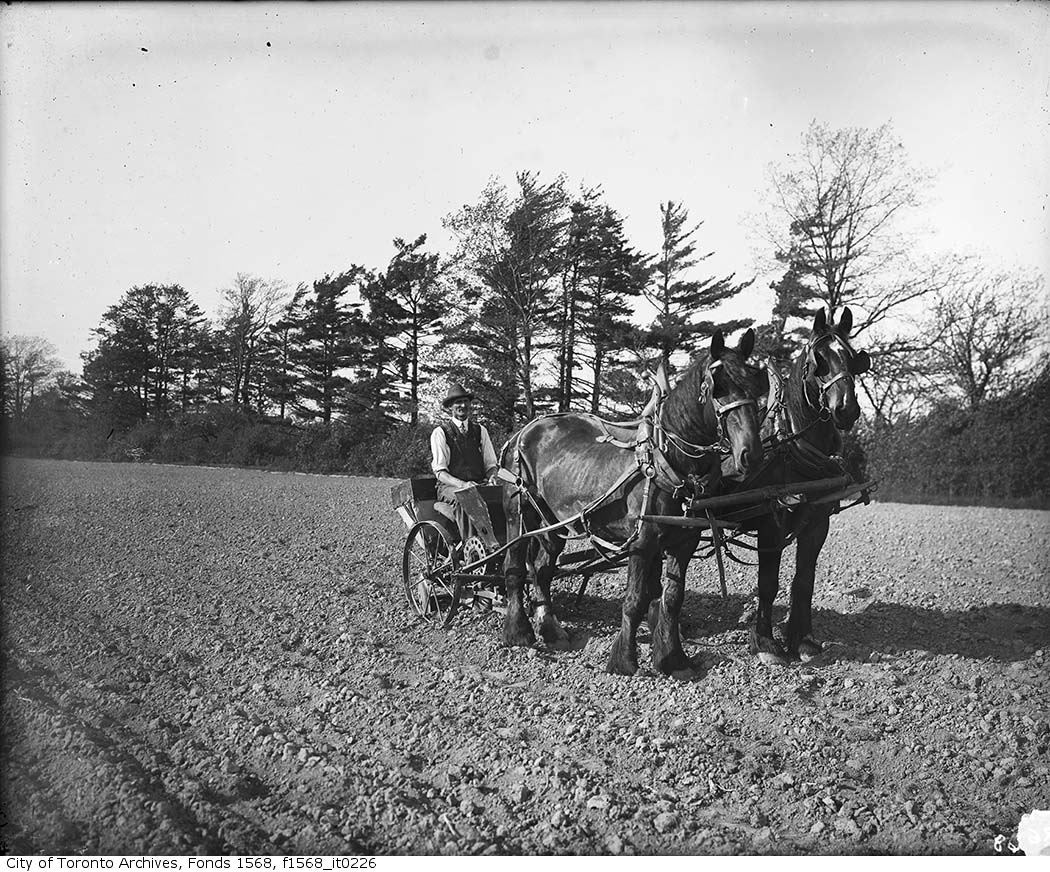
A constable working on a farm north of Chaplin Crescent. In 1914, policing duties could also include farming.

During the 1930s and 1940s, the Toronto Police under Chief Constable Dennis "Deny" Draper, a retired brigadier general and former Conservative candidate, returned to its function as an agency to suppress political dissent. Its notorious "Red Squad" brutally dispersed demonstrations by labour unions and by unemployed and homeless people during the Great Depression of the 1930s. Suspicious of "foreigners", the police lobbied the city of Toronto to pass legislation banning public speeches in languages other than English, curtailing union organizations among Toronto's vast immigrant populations working in sweatshops.

After several scandals, including a call by Chief Draper to have reporters "shot" and his being arrested for driving drunk, the city appointed in 1948 a new police chief from its ranks for the first time in the department's history: John Chisholm, a very able senior police inspector. In 1955, the Metropolitan Toronto Board of Police Commissioners was formed in preparation for the amalgamation of the 13 police forces in the municipality, Metropolitan Toronto, into a unified police force with Chisholm as chief of the unified force. Unfortunately, Chisholm was not up to the politics of the Chief's office, especially in facing off with Fred "Big Daddy" Gardiner, who engineered almost single-handedly the formation of Metropolitan Toronto in the 1950s.

On January 1, 1957, the Toronto Police merged with the other municipal forces in the metropolitan area to form the Metropolitan Toronto Police Force:

Former police force	Current community	Field	Divisions
Scarborough Police Department	Scarborough	Area	41, 42, 43
Etobicoke Police Department	Etobicoke	Area	22, 23
North York Police Department	North York	Area; parts of Central	31, 32, 33; parts of 12, 13, 53
East York Police Department	East York	Central	54
Mimico Police Department	Etobicoke (Mimico)	Area	22
Weston Police Department	York (Weston, Ontario)	Area and Central	12, 31
Forest Hill Police Department	Toronto (Forest Hill, Ontario)	Central	53
Town of Leaside Police Department	East York (Leaside, Ontario)	Central	53, 54
York Township Police Department	York	Central	13
New Toronto Police Department	Etobicoke (New Toronto, Ontario)	Area	22
Swansea Police Department	Toronto (Swansea, Ontario)	Central	11
Long Branch Police Department	Etobicoke (Long Branch, Ontario)	Area	22

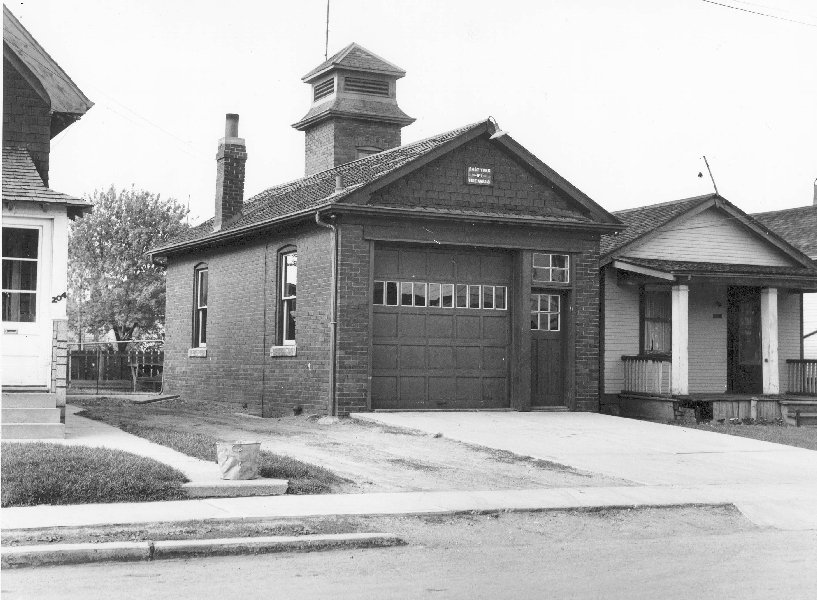
An East York Police and Fire Station. In 1957, the East York Police was amalgamated with other municipal forces in the metropolitan area, forming the Metropolitan Toronto Police.

With amalgamation, the force grew in size and complexity, and Chisholm found himself unable to manage the huge agency and its Byzantine politics. In 1958, after several conflicts with Gardiner and members of the newly expanded Metropolitan Toronto Board of Police Commissioners, Chief Chisholm drove to High Park on the city's west end, parked his car, and committed suicide with his service revolver. Former staff superintendent Jack Webster, one of the officers who arrived at the scene of the chief's death and who would, upon his retirement in the 1990s, become the force historian at the Toronto Police Museum, would later write, "Suicide is a constant partner in every police car."

In 1960, Lawrence "Larry" McLarty became the force's first black officer and paved the way for the hiring of minorities into policing.

In 1990, the Board of Police Commissioners was renamed as the "Municipality of Metropolitan Toronto Police Services Board", and, upon the creation of the amalgamated City of Toronto in 1998, it became the Toronto Police Services Board, administering the Toronto Police Service.

=== 21st century ===
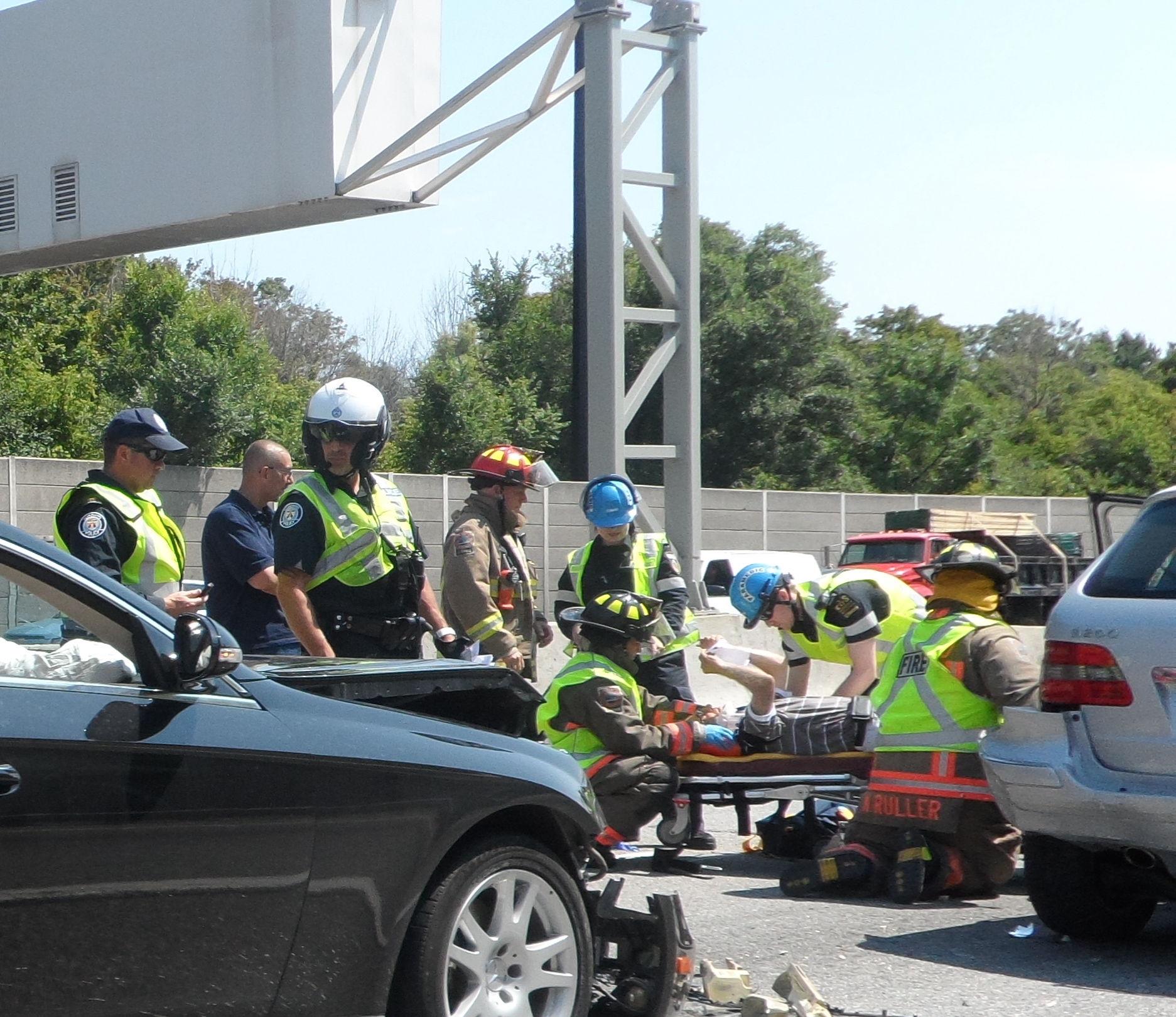
Police and members of the Toronto Fire Services at a car crash on the Don Valley Parkway. Toronto Police works with other emergency services throughout Greater Toronto.

Today, the Toronto Police Service is responsible for overall local police service in Toronto and works with the other emergency services (Toronto Paramedic Services and Toronto Fire Services) and other police forces in the Greater Toronto Area (GTA), including:

- Peel Regional Police
- York Regional Police
- Halton Regional Police
- Durham Regional Police Service
- Ontario Provincial Police
- Royal Canadian Mounted Police

For most of 2005, the police union and the Toronto Police Services Board (the civilian governing body) were involved in lengthy contract negotiations. The rank and file had been without a contract since the end of 2004 and conducted a work-to-rule campaign in the fall of 2005. The police force is an essential public service and is legally prohibited from striking. The Toronto Police Service launched its social media strategy on July 27, 2011, and "has the most active Twitter accounts listed under a single police force in Canada"

On March 24, 2026, the TPS announce the creation of a new unit known as the Counter-Terrorism Security Unit (CTSU).

=== Controversies ===
In 1988, Toronto Police were under scrutiny for the fatal shooting of schizophrenic Lester Donaldson. The shooting was the first of eight over the next four years, and the latest in a series of shootings since the late 1970s, in which mostly unarmed, black Canadians were victims. Three days after his death, the Black Action Defence Committee, a group of local activists, was formed. The group made headlines when they introduced the issue of race in the coroner's inquest into Donaldson's killing. In 1990, Toronto police officer David Deviney was charged with manslaughter in connection with the killing and was later acquitted.

In 1992, tension between Toronto Police and the city's black community reached its peak. After the fourth police killing of a young black man (Raymond Lawrence, 22, was shot and killed by two Peel Regional police officers after swinging a knife at officers during an arrest) in as many years, a peaceful protest on Yonge Street later turned into a riot. Thirty people were arrested, and 37 police officers were injured in the riot. A mandatory coroner's inquest took place into the police killing of 17-year-old Jeffrey Reodica. Although accounts differ, it is generally accepted that Reodica was part of a group of Filipino teenagers pursuing a group of white teenagers on May 21, 2004, in Scarborough, following altercations between the two groups. Plainclothes Toronto police officer Det.-Const. Dan Belanger and his partner Det. Allen Love was in the process of arresting Reodica when Reodica was shot three times by the officers. The teen died in the hospital three days later. Belanger and Love were eventually cleared by the Special Investigations Unit (SIU) after investigating the matter and found that there were no reasonable grounds to lay any charges. According to the SIU, Reodica brandished a knife at officers. The knife was reportedly recovered at the scene.

In 2004, eight people were shot by Toronto Police, six of them fatally. SIU investigations deemed all case actions justified. In 2005, the police service was faced with a spike in shootings across Toronto and increased concern among residents. Police Chief William Blair and Mayor David Miller asked for additional resources and asked for diligence from residents to contend with this issue. Ontario Premier Dalton McGuinty promised to work with Toronto to fight crime.

In 2007, the Toronto Police were involved in an international incident in which their members pepper-sprayed, tasered, and handcuffed members of the Chilean national soccer team in an attempt to keep control of crowds after their semi-final match in the 2007 FIFA U-20 World Cup. A police spokesman explained on CBC Radio on the program Here and Now that police took action against individual members of the Chilean team when they "displayed aggressive behavior" by vandalizing a bus and arguing with fans. The actions of the police were criticized by the TV and print media in Chile, and initially also in Canada. FIFA president Sepp Blatter later apologized to the Toronto mayor for the incident, and instigated disciplinary action against the officials and players of the Chilean team. In response to the recommendations of the coroner's inquest jury, former chief Bill Blair recommended that all plainclothes police officers be issued arm bands and raid jackets bearing the word police in an effort to increase their visibility in critical situations. Unmarked cars, which were already equipped with a plug-in police light, were to be supplied with additional emergency equipment, including a siren package. The proposals were phased within three years. In 2008, undercover officers also must wear, carry or have access to standard police use-of-force options such as pepper spray and batons.

In 2013, 18-year-old Sammy Yatim was shot and killed by Constable James Forcillo on the 505 Dundas streetcar after threatening other passengers and the police with a knife. On August 19, 2013, Forcillo was charged with second-degree murder. In January 2016, Forcillo was convicted of attempted murder. Four Toronto Police officers were arrested and charged with nine counts of obstructing justice and eight counts of perjury.

In 2020, Constable Peter Roberts was arrested and charged with obtaining sexual services for consideration from persons under 18 years of age.

In February 2026, York Regional Police arrested 8 current and former Toronto Police officers following the Project South probe into corruption and organized crime. The officers are accused of "bribery, obstruction of justice, drug trafficking, theft of personal property, breach of trust and the unauthorized access and distribution of confidential information." The probe began in June 2025 following the discovery of a conspiracy to murder a senior corrections officer at an Ontario detention centre.

== Governance ==
=== Chiefs of police ===
The chief of police is the highest-ranking officer of the Toronto Police Service. The position was known as "high constable" until 1859 and then as "chief constable" until 1957, when the Toronto Police Department was amalgamated with 12 other Toronto-area forces to form the Metropolitan Toronto Police. Most chiefs have been chosen amongst the ranks of the Toronto force and promoted or appointed from the ranks of deputy chiefs; Fantino was hired from the York Regional Police, but he had been a career officer with Toronto Police prior, leaving as acting staff superintendent.

Toronto Police Department (1834–1956):

High constables

- William Higgins 1834
- George Kingsmill 1835
- James Stitt 1836
- George Kingsmill 1837–1846
- George Allen 1847–1852
- Samuel Sherwood 1852–1859

Chief constables

- William Stratton Prince 1859–1873
- Frank C. Draper 1874–1886
- H. J. Grasett 1886–1920
- Samuel J. Dickson 1920–1928
- Dennis Draper 1928–1946
- John Chisholm 1946–1956

Metropolitan Toronto Police (1957–1995), Metropolitan Toronto Police Service (1995–1998), Toronto Police Service (1998–present)

Chiefs of police:

- John Chisholm 1957–1958 (died 1958 from suicide)
- James Page Mackey 1958–1970 (died 2009)
- Harold Adamson 1970–1980 (died 2001)
- Jack W. Ackroyd 1980–1984 (died 1992)
- Jack Marks 1984–1989 (died 2007)
- William J. McCormack 1989–1995 (died 2016)
- David Boothby 1995–2000
- Julian Fantino 2000–2005
- Mike Boyd 2005 (interim)
- Bill Blair 2005–2015
- Mark Saunders 2015–2020
- James Ramer 2020–2022 (interim)
- Myron Demkiw 2022–present

=== Funding ===
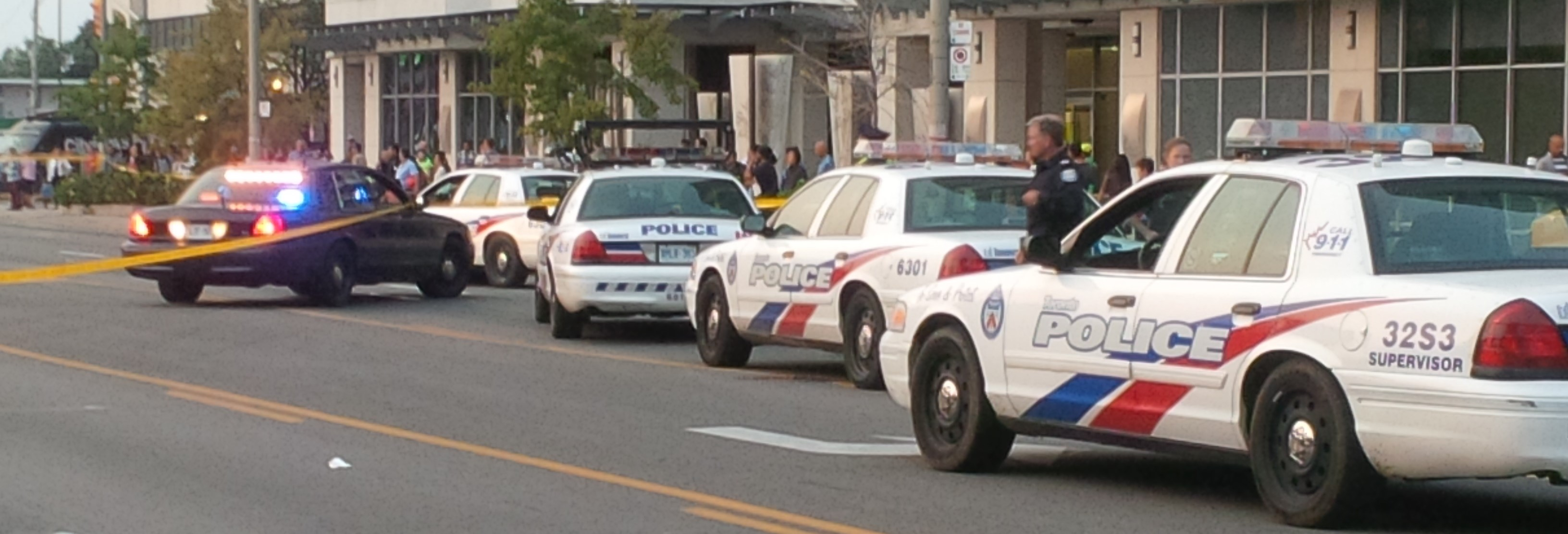
TPS cruisers arrive at a high risk incident in North York in 2014

As an agency of the City of Toronto, the annual funding level is established by a vote of the Toronto City Council in favor of the year's proposed budget. In 2023, TPS requested a budget of $1.16 billion.

=== Oversight ===
The actions of the Toronto Police are examined by the Special Investigations Unit, a civilian agency responsible for investigating incidents involving police and civilians that have resulted in a serious injury, death, or allegations of sexual assault. The SIU is dedicated to maintaining one law, ensuring equal justice before the law among both the police and the public. They assure that the criminal law is applied appropriately to police conduct, as determined through independent investigations, increasing public confidence in the police services. Complaints involving police conduct that do not result in a serious injury or death must be referred to the appropriate police service or another oversight agency, such as the Ontario Civilian Commission.

== Operations ==
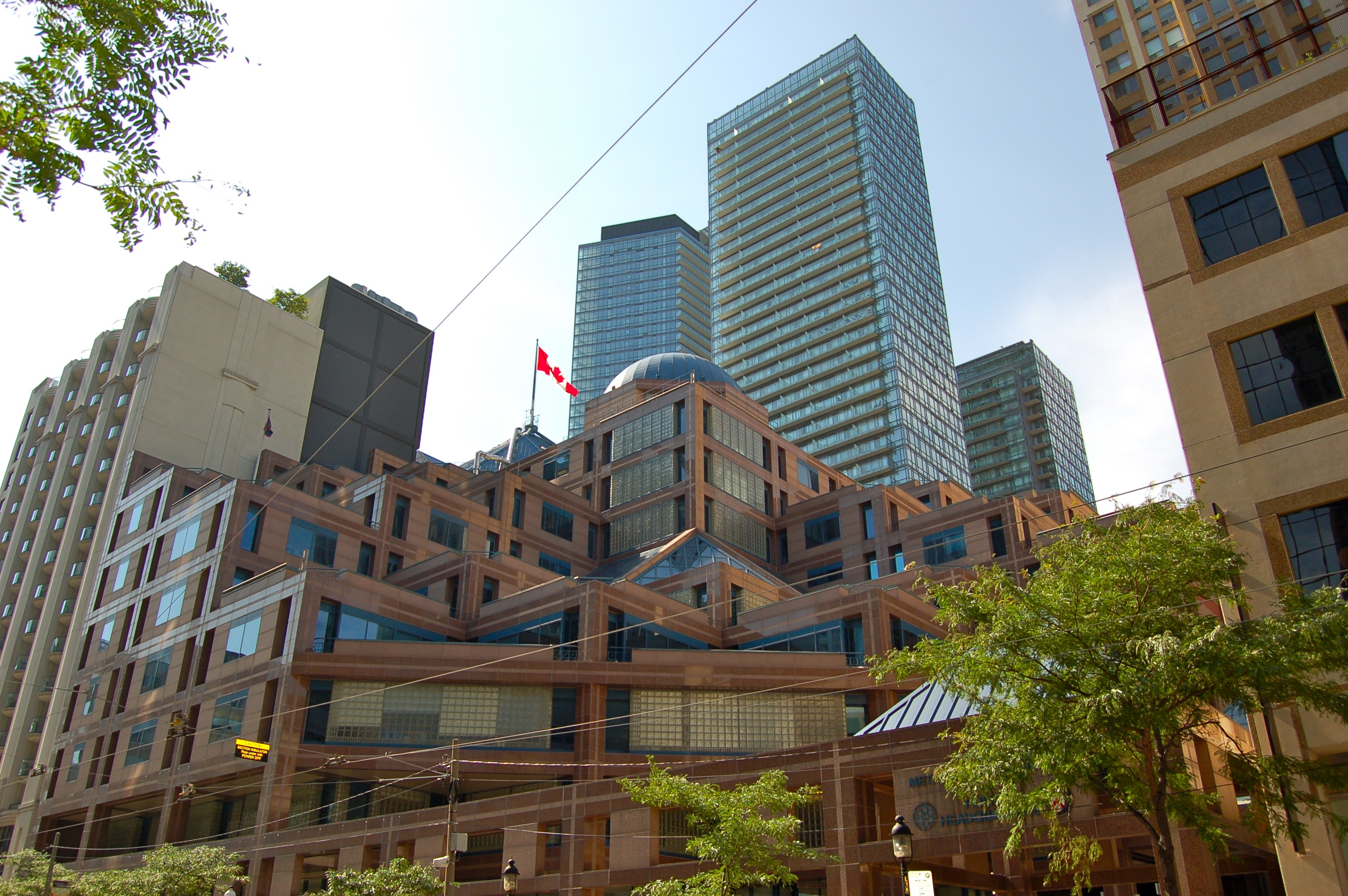
Toronto Police Headquarters is located on College Street in Downtown Toronto.

Toronto Police Headquarters is located at 40 College Street, near Bay Street in downtown Toronto. The former headquarters at Jarvis Street was turned into a museum (which was subsequently relocated to the current headquarters). The present site was once home to the Toronto YMCA. The sign over the main entrance still reads "Metropolitan Toronto Police Headquarters" and displays the emblem of Metropolitan Toronto (which was dissolved in 1998). Since 2007, the sign also displays the current emblem of the Toronto Police Service.

The Toronto Police Service has approximately 5,400 uniformed officers/undercover officers and 2,500 civilian employees. Its officers are among the best paid in Canada. In October 2008, the Toronto Police Service was named one of Greater Toronto's Top Employers by Mediacorp Canada Inc., which was announced by the Toronto Star newspaper.

The Toronto Police Service is divided into two field areas and 17 divisions (police stations or precincts):

=== West Field Command ===
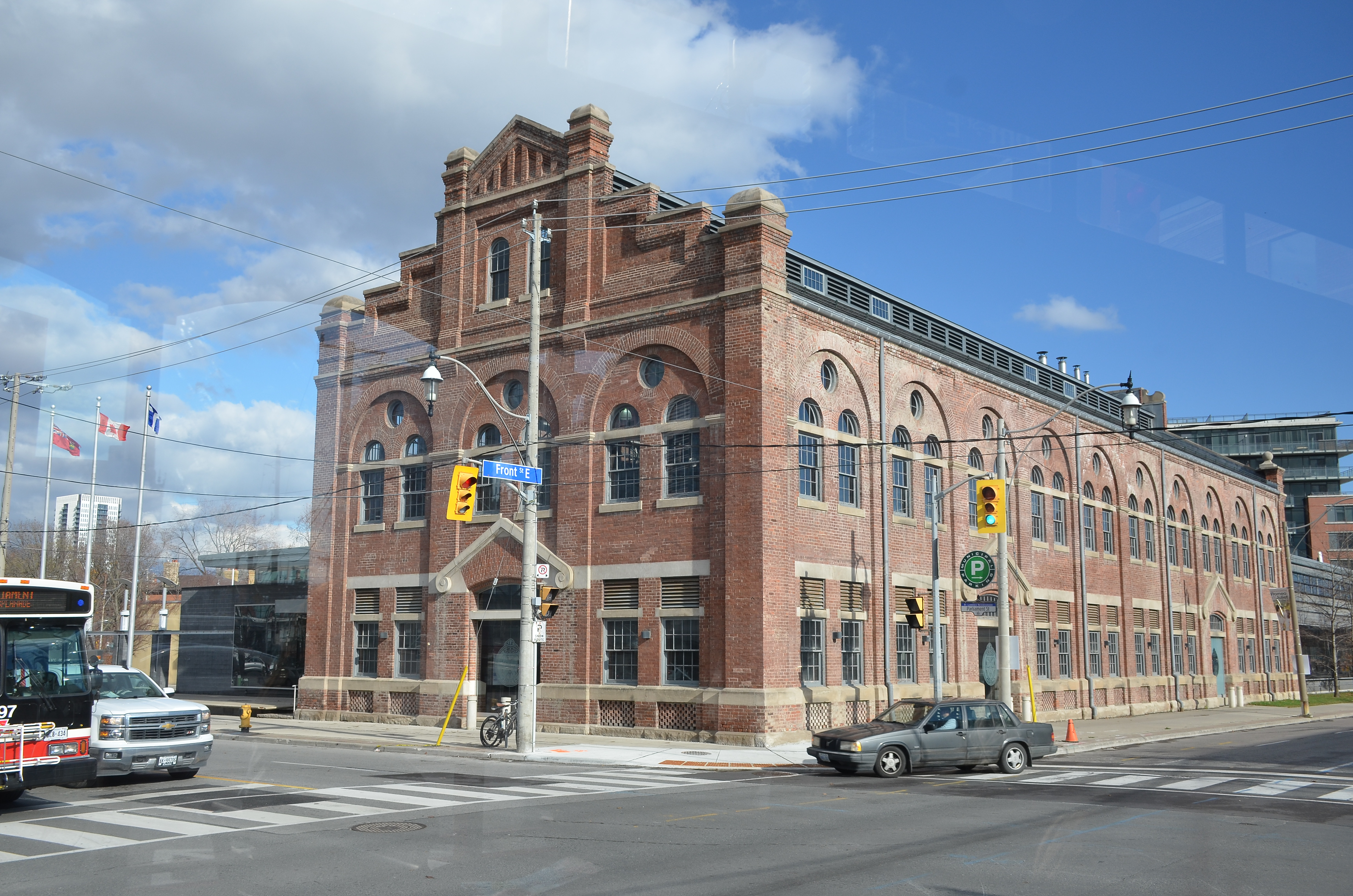
The station for 51 Division is located on 51 Parliament Street.

Encompasses the original city of Toronto, the former cities of York and East York, and some southern portions of the former City of North York.

- 11 Division, 2054 Davenport Rd.
- 12 Division, 200 Trethewey Dr.
- 14 Division, 350 Dovercourt Rd. (14 Sub-Station is located at Exhibition Place)
- 22 Division, 3699 Bloor St. W.
- 23 Division, 5230 Finch Ave. W.
- 31 Division, 40 Norfinch Dr.
- 51 Division, 51 Parliament St.
- 52 Division, 255 Dundas St. W.

=== East Field Command ===
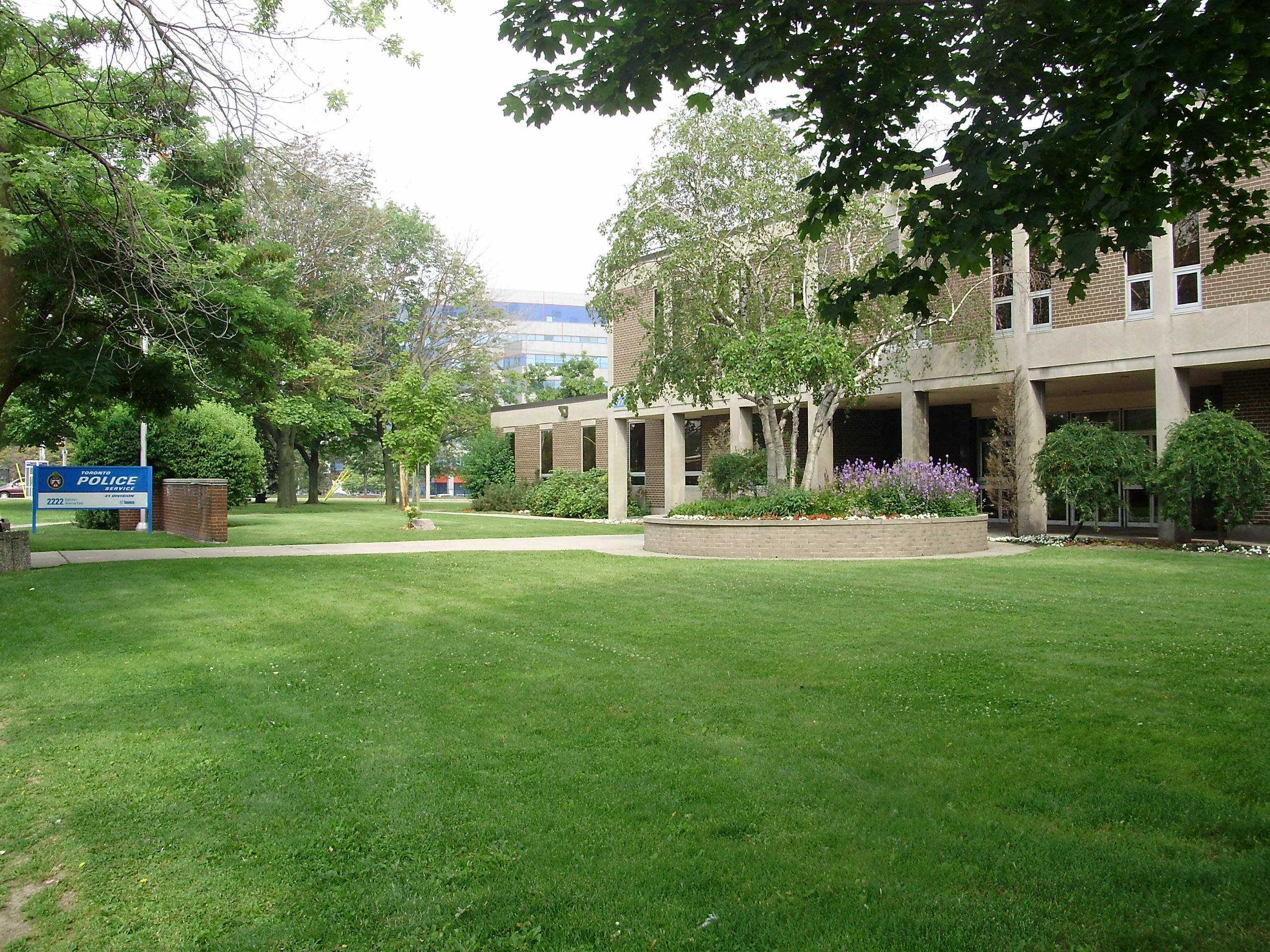
Located in Scarborough, 41 Division is based at 2222 Eglinton Avenue East.

Encompasses the former cities of North York and Scarborough.

- 13 Division, 1435 Eglinton Ave. W
- 32 Division, 30 Ellerslie Ave.
- 33 Division, 50 Upjohn Rd.
- 41 Division, 2222 Eglinton Ave. E.
- 42 Division, 242 Milner Ave. E.
- 43 Division, 4331 Lawrence Ave. E
- 53 Division, 75 Eglinton Ave. W.
- 55 Division, 101 Coxwell Ave.

=== Field Services ===
- Priority Operations, 40 College St.
- Toronto Police Operations Centre (TPOC), 40 College St.
- Primary Report Intake, Management, and Entry Unit
- Communication Services
- Public Safety Response Team
- Community Partnerships & Engagement Unit
- Traffic Operations, 9 Hanna Ave
- Parking enforcement east, 330 Progress Ave.
- Parking enforcement west, 970 Lawrence Ave. West

=== Specialized Operations Command ===
==== Detective Operations ====
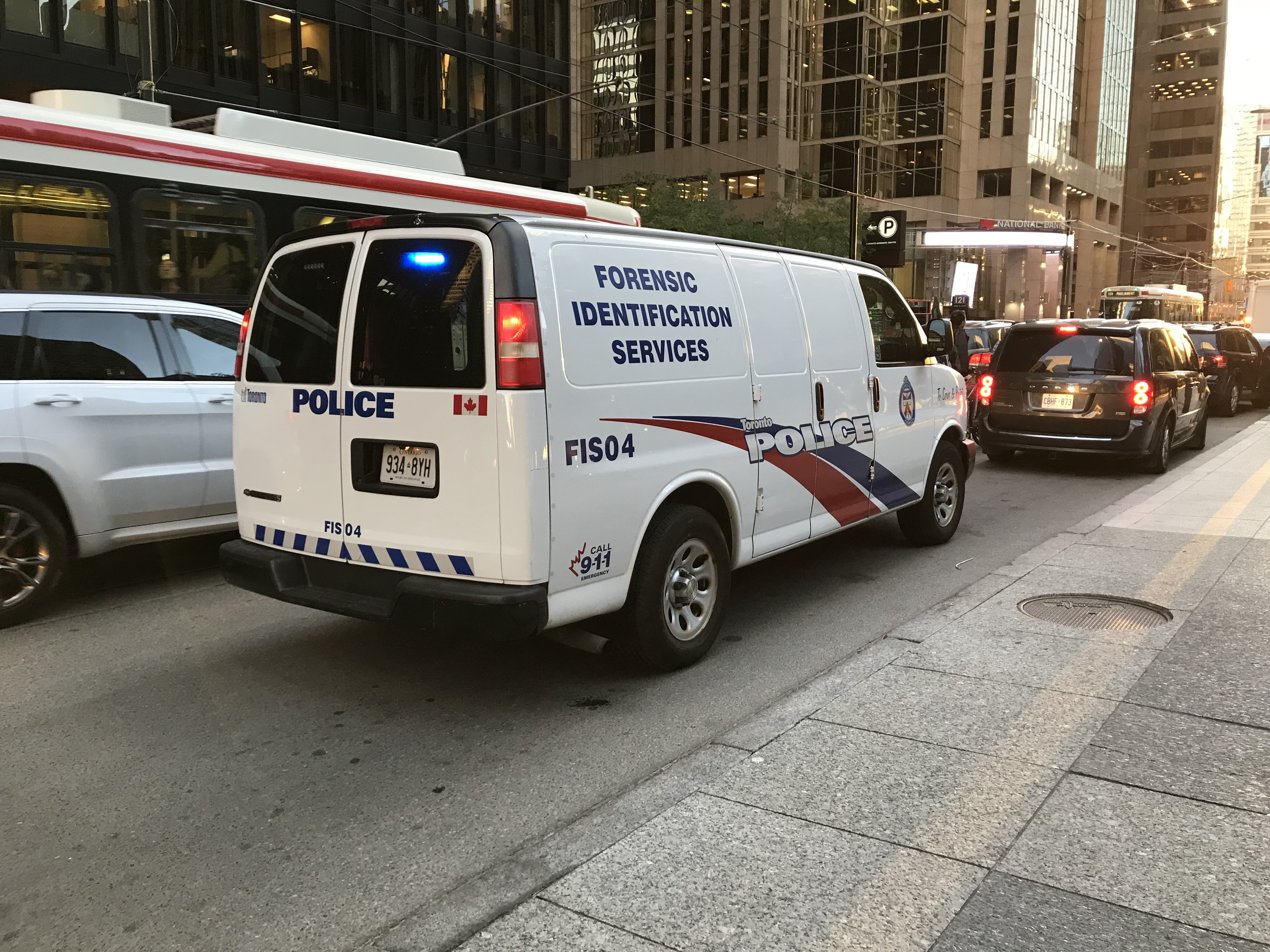
A van from the Toronto Police Service's Forensic Identification Services

- Forensic Identification Services, 2050 Jane St.
- Homicide squad, 40 College St.
- Provincial Repeat Offender Parole Enforcement (PROPE) Squad.
- Drug squad, 40 College St., replaced the Toronto Police Service's Central Field Command Drug Squad from the 1990s
- Organized crime enforcement, 40 College St.
- Financial crimes unit, 40 College St.
- Hold-up squad, 40 College St.
- Intelligence services, 40 College St.
- Sex crimes unit, 40 College St.
- Integrated gun and gang task force (Replaced by the Asian crime unit, hate crimes unit).

==== Public Safety Operations ====
Operational services of the Toronto Police Service include:

- Emergency Management and Public Order (Public Safety Unit, Mounted Unit)
- Emergency Task Force, 300 Lesmill Rd.
- Marine, 259 Queen's Quay W.
- Mounted and police dog services, 44 Beechwood Drive
- Court Services (Prisoner Transport Unit, various courthouses in the city)

==== Emergency task force ====
The emergency task force is the tactical unit of the Toronto Police Service. They are mandated to deal with high-risk incidents such as gun calls, hostage situations, barricaded persons, emotionally disturbed persons, high-risk arrest warrants, and protection details. In 1961, an earlier non-SWAT riot and emergency squad was separately formed. In 1965, both of them merged into the emergency task force.

==== Marine unit ====
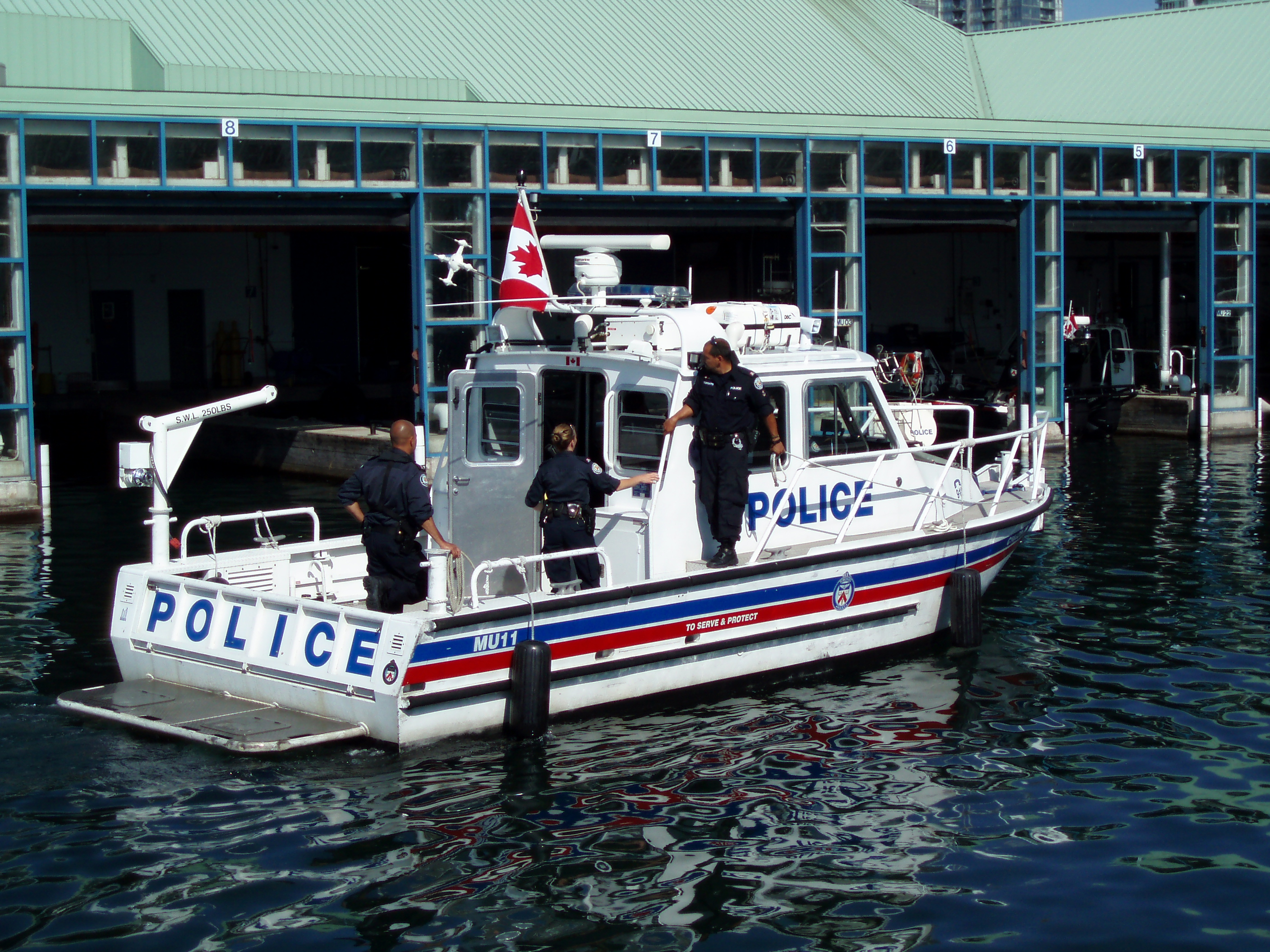
Marine unit boat outside the unit's station at Harbourfront

The Toronto Police Service is one of several police forces along Lake Ontario with a marine unit. Before the 1980s, the port area had its police force, Toronto Harbour Police/Port of Toronto Police, which merged into the Metropolitan Police Force's marine unit. The unit's has the largest jurisdictional area of any unit in the Toronto Police Service, policing over 1,200 square kilometres (460 sq mi) of open water, from the Etobicoke Creek to the Rouge River in the west and east respectively, and south to the water boundaries of Niagara Region and the United States.

The Toronto Police Service has a fleet of 24 boats based either at the main station of the unit, at 259 Queens Quay West in Harbourfront; or at one of its three substations, at Humber Bay, the Scarborough Bluffs, and the Toronto Islands.

The Toronto Police Service Marine Unit works in conjunction with other municipal and regional police units that operate marine units in Lake Ontario, including the Durham Regional Police, Halton Regional Police, Hamilton Police Service, Niagara Regional Police Service, and the Peel Regional Police. The Marine Unit also works in partnership with the neighboring York Regional Police, although their marine unit is based in Lake Simcoe. In addition to municipal/regional police services, the Toronto Police Service Marine Unit also works in conjunction with the Canadian Forces Search and Rescue Unit based in CFB Trenton, and the Toronto Search and Rescue volunteer service (which has ties to the Canadian Coast Guard Auxiliary).

==== Mounted unit ====
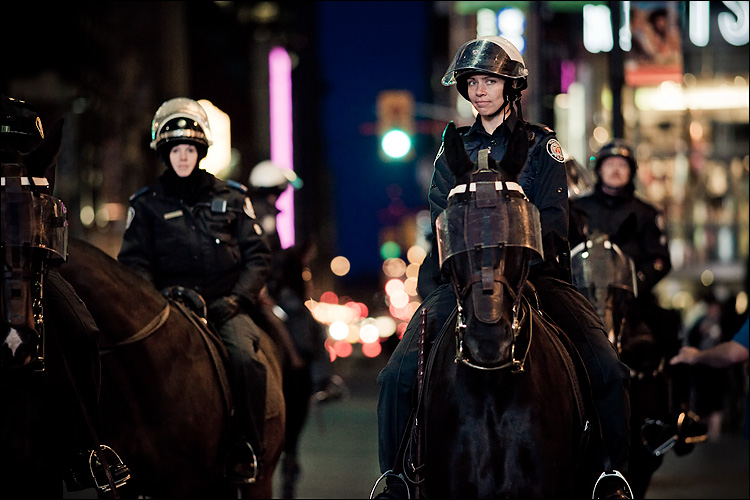
Members of the Toronto Police Mounted Unit on patrol on Yonge Street.

The service's mounted unit responds to radio calls and proactively patrols, providing crowd control operations and assisting with community relations programs. In 2022, the mounted unit had 24 horses and approximately 36 police officers, with a requested budget of $5.9 million. The unit's is based at Horse Palace at Exhibition Place.

A full-time was formed by police service was formed in 1886 to provide a presence in outlying areas of the city where police were seldom seen prior. Initially, the mounted unit's duties included rounding up stray cattle and horses, providing crowd control, providing a mounted escort for parades, and regulating street traffic. The size of the unit fluctuated in response to local demands throughout the 20th century. The mounted unit grew in size during the 1930s in response to the social discord caused by the Great Depression. The unit underwent a similar expansion during the 1960s, with the unit increasing in size to 60 horses in response to a rise in public demonstrations. Following the end of the Vietnam War, the unit was gradually reduced to its present size.

===== Horses =====
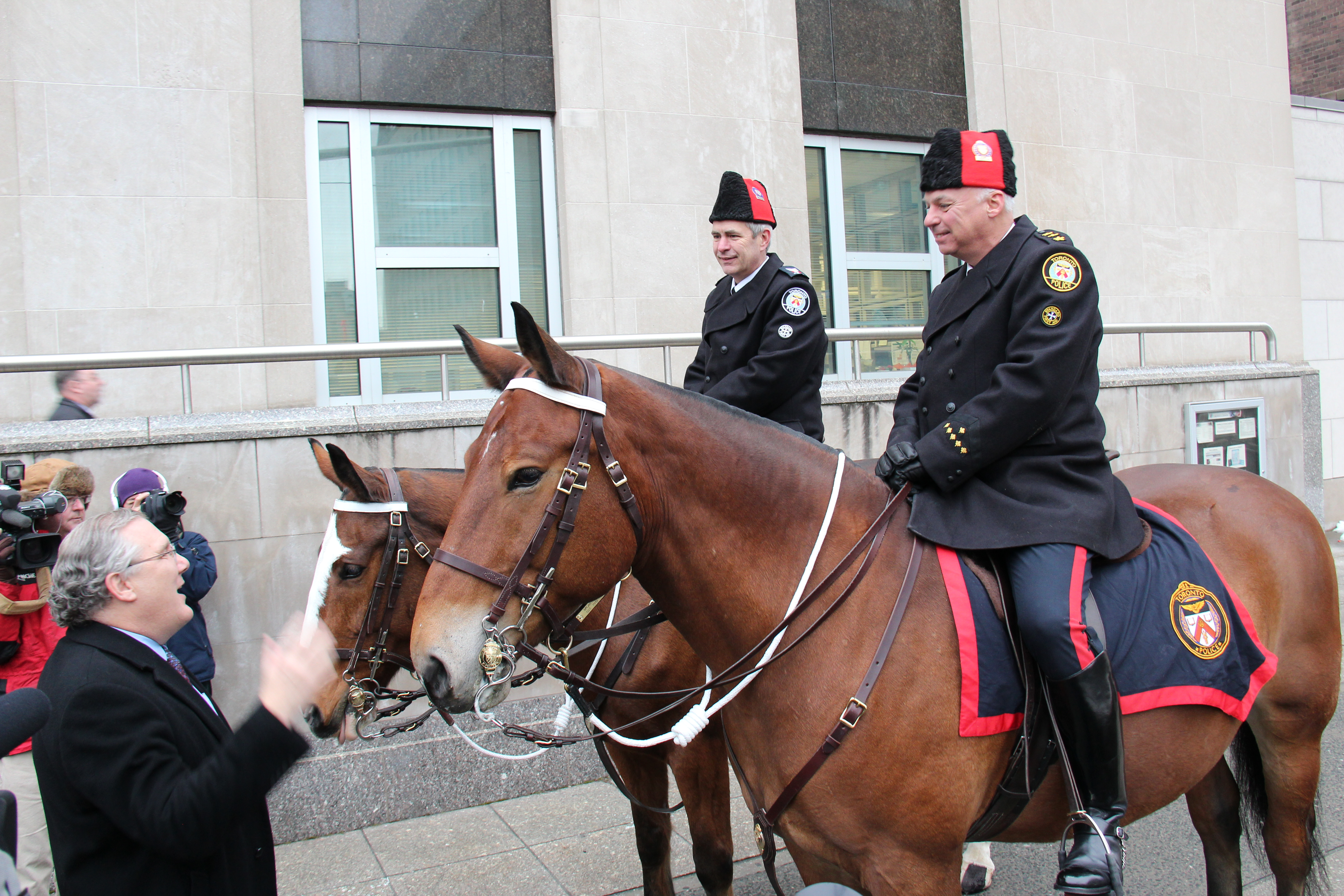
Police horses Ed and Spencer at the U.S. Consulate in Toronto. Both horses were invited to take part in the First inauguration of Barack Obama.

The unit's horses are sourced from several brokers based in the province. The unit only purchases black, bay, or chestnut coloured horses that stand a minimum of 16 hands.

Three horses have been killed while on duty. They include Lancer, following a motor vehicle collision in 2002; Brigadier (born 1998 near Listowel, Ontario) after an intentional motor vehicle collision in 2006; and Royal Sun, following a torn leg ligament in 2012. During the First World War, the mounted unit provided 18 horses to the Canadian Field Artillery. Only one horse from the Toronto Police Service survived the four-year conflict.

Notable police horses include Honest Ed and Spencer were invited to the inauguration of US President Barack Obama by Michigan's Multi-Jurisdictional Mounted Police Drill Team and Color Guard. Other horses include:

Name	Breed	Year acquired	Named for and notes
Elvis	Percheron	2002	Const. Elvis Zovic, killed in the line of duty
Kingston	Percheron	2008	Was won at the North American Police Equestrian Championships in Kingston
Simcoe	Percheron	2006	John Simcoe, founder of Toronto
Dundas	Clydesdale/TB	2006	Thomas Dundas, a mounted officer who served in World War One
Sutherland			Former mounted unit commander, Edward Sutherland Johnson
Lincoln	Percheron	1998	Lincoln Alexander, former Lt. Governor of Ontario
Grenadier	Clydesdale	2010	
Chief Blair	Percheron-Friesian	2017	Tradition holds that a horse be named "Chief" to honor command officers. Currently, names for former Chief Bill Blair
Honest Ed	Clydesdale/TB	2004	Honest Ed Mirvish
Tecumseh	Percheron	2005	Famous First Nation's chief
Timmis	Percheron/Standardbred	2006	Reginald Timmis of the Royal Canadian Dragoons
Bobby	Percheron	2006	Const. Bobby Wright died during Unit training.
Strathcona	Clyde/Cleveland Bay	2008	Lord Strathcona Cavalry
Sabre	Percheron	1998	
Boot	Belgian	1999	Former chief David Boothby
Blue Moon	Percheron/TB		Won at Police Equestrian Championships in Kentucky; only grey in the unit
Trooper	Percheron	2007	
Woulfe	Belgian/TB		Staff Sgt. Pat Woulfe
Dragoon	Percheron	2006	Royal Canadian Dragoons
Winston	Percheron		Full name of Winter Sun; after Royal Winter Fair
Charger	Clydesdale	2002	
Commodore	Belgian	2006	Brigadier, police horse killed in 2006; commodore is the naval equivalent
Dorothy			Dorothy Keith, unit supporter. The only mare in the unit.
Keith	Canadian/Standardbred		William Lord Keith
Major	Percheron/TB	2008	
Vimy Ridge	Percheron/Morgan	2005	Battle of Vimy Ridge in World War One
Russell	Clydesdale	2016	Sgt. Ryan Russell
William	Clydesdale	2017	Staff Inspector William Wardie
Blue Jay	Clydesdale	2017	Donated by Toronto Blue Jays

==== Parking enforcement ====
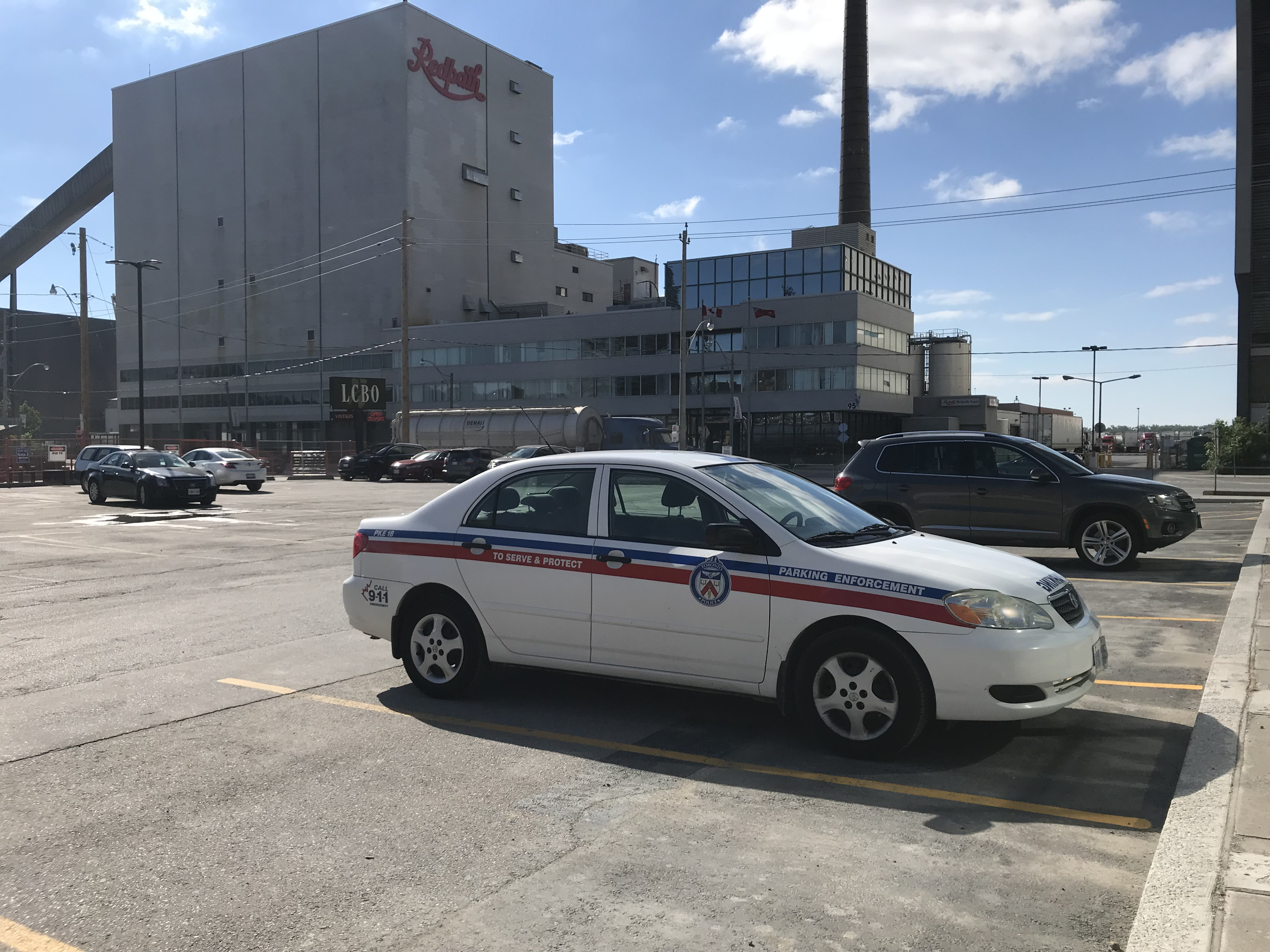
A vehicle used by members of the Toronto Police Service's parking enforcement unit

Parking enforcement on all roads and public property is the responsibility of the Toronto Police and works with Toronto Parking Authority. Parking enforcement officers are provincial offense officers able to issue parking tickets under Part II of the Provincial Offences Act. They do not carry any use-of-force items and are unarmed, but are issued Kevlar vests for safety. They are peace officers under section 15 of the Police Services Act to enforce municipal by-laws.

Their uniform consists of a blue shirt, black cargo pants with blue stripes, a black vest, and a cap with blue stripes. Boots are similar to front-line police officers. In the winter months, parking enforcement officers have a blue jacket with reflective trim. Patches on the jackets and shirts are similar to those of the Toronto Police Service, but with a white background and the blue wording "parking enforcement".

Their vehicles have the same paint scheme as the older Toronto Police Service squad cars, but they are labeled with "parking enforcement" and fleet numbers "PKE" (east) or "PKW" (west).

==== Police dog services ====
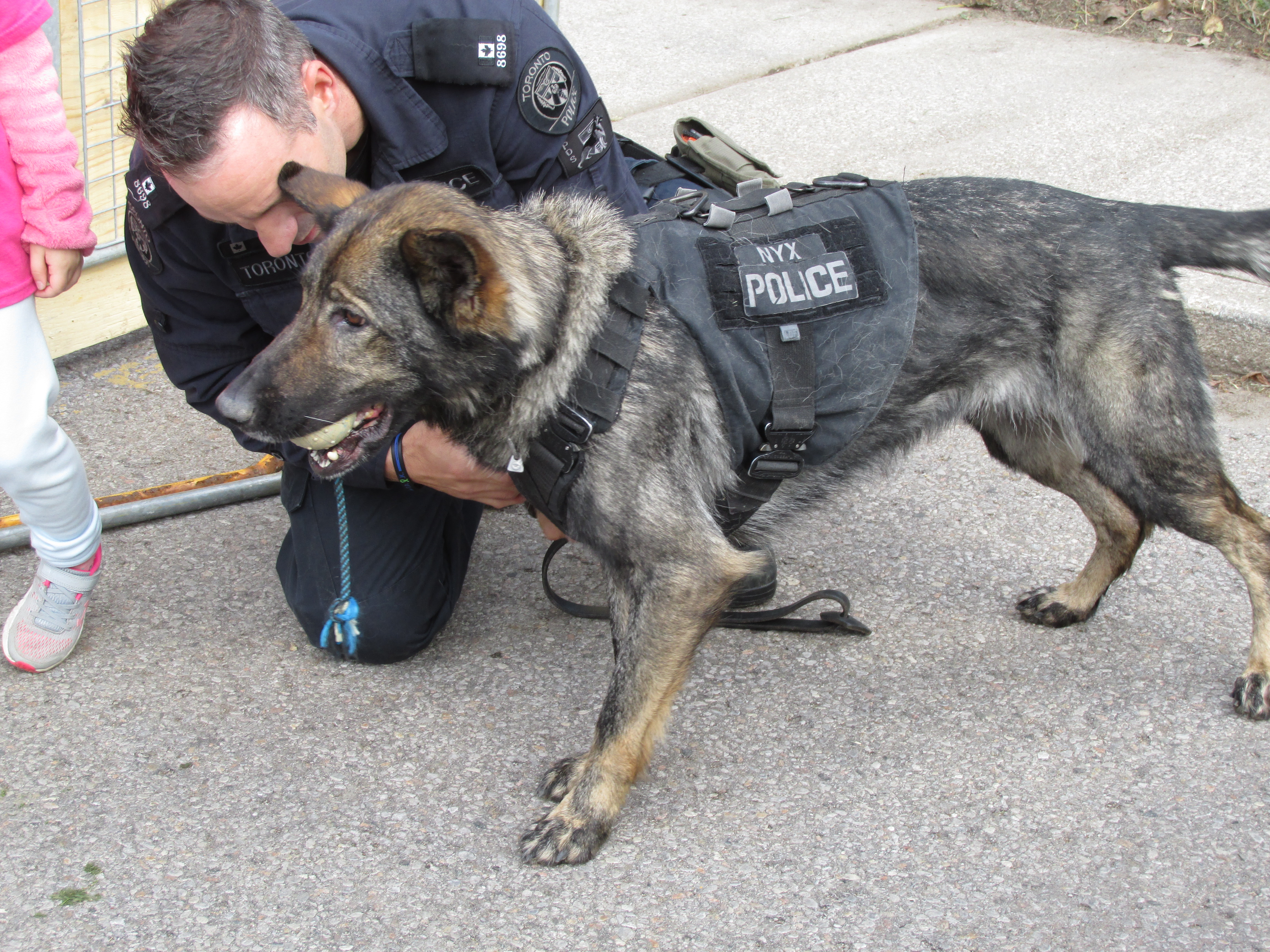
A police dog named Nyx with the Toronto Police Service

The Toronto Police Service police dog unit was created in 1989 and is deployed to search for suspects, missing persons, and perform other duties. The service has 17 general-purpose dogs. There are four drug enforcement dogs and one explosives detector dog. The 21 officers and dogs are assigned to this unit and are based at 44 Beechwood Drive in Toronto, East York.

Toronto Police dogs that have died during their service, including Keno, a firearms detector, and Luke, a general service dog, both in 2011.

==== Community Mobilization Unit ====
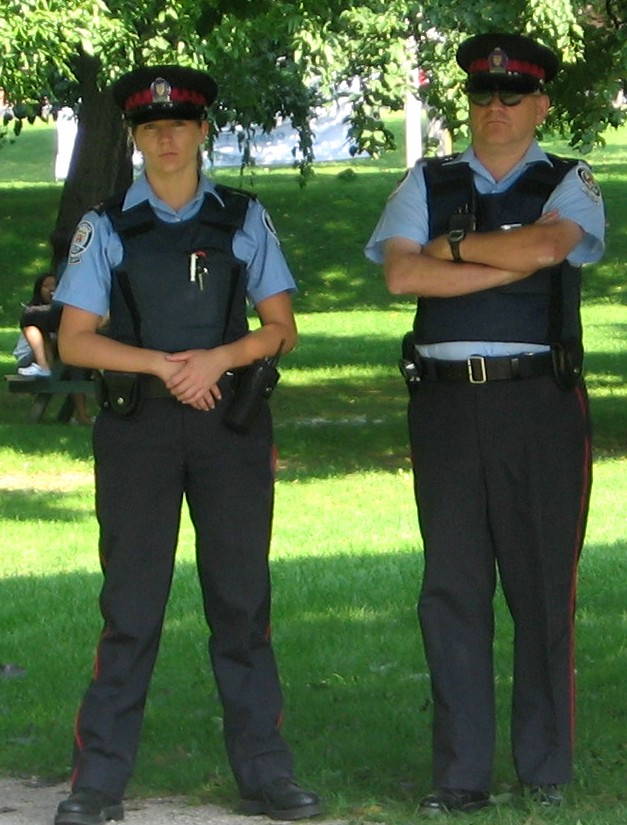
Auxiliary constables of the Toronto Police Service

- Auxiliary (auxiliary constable), volunteer and rover program
- Youth programs
- Empowered student partnership
- Toronto Recreational Outreach Program (TROOP)
- Public Education and Crime Eradication (PEACE) Project

==== Traffic services ====
As 400-series highways are owned by the province of Ontario, policing on 400-series highways within the city of Toronto (highways 401, 400, 427, 404) is the responsibility of the Ontario Provincial Police (though all Ontario police officers have province-wide jurisdiction). Toronto Police Traffic Services is responsible for patrolling local roads and municipal expressways (W.R. Allen Road, Don Valley Parkway, F.G. Gardiner Expressway); traffic services have a "60" or "66 Division" (60xx or 66xx) designation on their cars.

==== Transit Bureau ====
The transit bureau commands 12 transit districts where TPS officers patrol the Toronto Transit Commission vehicles and property. The bureau replaced the earlier Special Constable Services (c. 1997), Transit Patrol Unit (2009–2013), and the non-fare enforcement role of the TTC Special Constables. From 1987 to 1997, TTC staff enforced TTC bylaws and fare issues without a formal unit.

==== Toronto Police Pipe Band ====
The Toronto Police Pipe Band was formed in 1912. The band was originally composed of serving police officers; however, membership is open to any person. Today, the Toronto Police Pipe Band organization comprises two professional bands in grades 1 and 2, and 3 juvenile bands in grades 3, 4, and 5 through its affiliate Ryan Russell Memorial Pipe Band. The bands compete in local and international pipe band competitions, and also play as representatives of the police force in community parades, and police ceremonies.

=== Former departments ===
==== Toronto Police Lifeguard Service ====
Toronto Police previously employed lifeguards, responsible for patrolling 11 beaches and 44 kilometers of shoreline during the summer months, who were assisted by the Toronto Police Service (including the marine unit), Toronto Paramedic Services, and Toronto Fire Services. In 2017, as part of a modernization initiative, the Toronto Police Lifeguard Service was transferred to the Toronto Parks, Forestry & Recreation Division.

==== Morality department ====
The morality department was formed in 1886, when then Mayor William Holmes Howland appointed ex-Royal Irish Constabulary officer David Archibald to head this special unit of the Toronto Police Service to deal specifically with "vice, sin, and crimes which heavily impacted women and children". Howland had just won Toronto's mayoral race that year by promising to make Toronto a beacon of morality for the world, even going so far as to give Toronto the moniker, "Toronto the Good". The department ran through the 1930s, and was seen as a forerunner to many social assistance programs, such as the Children's Aid Society. It was set up under a social purist pretext of policing people's everyday behaviors so that Toronto might live up to Howland's moniker. Among the offenses, though not necessarily crimes, that morality officers policed were gambling, "blue laws" or "Sabbath laws", being an absentee father, drug dealing, interracial relationships, homosexuality, bootlegging and alcoholism, vagrancy, family abuse and prostitution. The people in power who wrote these laws, such as Howland, and created the morality department said that they were there to protect moral and good people from the evils of the city. However, when examining the direct implementation/enforcement of these laws, and the effects they had on civilian life, the larger purpose of the morality department was to prevent working-class people from socializing or coming together, and thereby to keep them in a generally less powerful position.

===== Context =====
The roots of this social purity doctrine can be traced back to the belief in the good of British colonialism, ideas still holding strong in the late 19th century in Canada, as Canada's national identity was still strongly linked to British ideals. The assumption is that bad people behave objectively badly and that these people need to be made good by a sovereign government. This government does so by limiting the civilian population's freedoms and regulating their social interactions to ensure that people remain "moral and good", and thereby can make a new generation of "moral and good" people. Of course, everyone would fall under these practices who was not seen to be morally or socially good, but women and people of color were seen by the government as inherently lesser or more susceptible to temptation or sin, and so they were policed far more heavily than their white or male counterparts. The resulting system of social governing was easily abused to keep a divide between classes wide, through methods like disproportionately enforcing the laws when the accused were of lower classes, and making special exemptions for people who lived or served those who lived in the higher classes. And, once again, since women and people of color were seen as inherently more susceptible to temptation, they were automatically made targets of the system's efforts to socially reform people.

===== Methods and effectiveness =====
The officers' methods often called for them to threaten fines or jail time rather than arrest all offenders, which made them popular among people as a social service. People knew that they probably would not be arrested or get the unwanted publicity that goes along with being arrested and going through the public courts. In this way, these officers became regulators of the community. Ordinary people interacted with them and thereby came to trust them. As a result, these officers had many people willing to give them information on who might be a suspected drug dealer, prostitute, gambler, or absentee father.

===== Prostitution =====
The primary focus of the anti-prostitution laws was to make prostitution unprofitable so that women would instead pursue legitimate ways to make money. In essence, the people who put these laws in place were attempting to save women from a life of prostitution. The legitimate forms of employment were few and far between; maid, secretary, and factory worker were the only plentiful options, and each of those put women in a position where they were constantly subordinate to another. Prostitution had a much wider definition to the social purists of the time than it does now. For example, if a man bought a woman dinner and the woman then went home with him, that was considered prostitution. Thus, any woman, and especially working-class women without social standing, who sought out men were persecuted, though not prosecuted. Seemingly innocuous behaviors, such as walking alone at night, might also get a woman arrested for prostitution.

===== Sabbath laws =====
The Sabbath laws (alternatively known as "blue laws") were a series of laws designed to prevent people from working on the Sabbath, commonly known as Sunday, to respect the Abrahamic God's day of rest. They, like most laws enforced by the morality department, disproportionately affected working-class people and favored the upper class. One of the best examples of this was the fact that taxis used by the public to get around were not allowed to work on Sundays, but private chauffeurs of the wealthy were. Beyond preventing many forms of work, they also prevented people from doing certain leisure activities that could be interpreted as work. Similar to the taxi driver–chauffeur contradiction, ball games for children in public on Sundays still allow for games of golf at private clubs. Such contradictions led people to believe that these laws were put in place to prevent working-class people from consorting with each other, to keep them separate and easy to manage.

===== Absentee fathers =====
For most of their operating time, the majority of their work was finding absentee fathers from Canada, the U.S., and Great Britain, and then coercing them into paying maintenance payments. These maintenance payments would go towards supporting their wives and children. This reinforced a family structure where the father was a provider, and the mother was unable to support herself or her family. As attitudes towards policing among the upper ranks moved away from social management and into crime and punishment in the 1920s, it came to be that the police and social activist groups alike agreed that this work was no longer a job for the police. In 1929, the newly established family court system took over the management of these payments.

===== First women on the force =====
Morality officer was one of the first roles within the police force, not including secretary, that women were allowed to fulfill. In the early 1910s, they were brought in under the idea that they would be better suited to deal with young women who had been acting immorally and that they would themselves be a moralizing influence in the police service. Also, the existence of policewomen was an encouragement for women to come forward with assault charges against their abusive husbands. Women would trust that if they went to a police officer who was also female, then something would be more likely to get done. Yet, the majority of their duties included arresting and searching female suspects, and interviewing female suspects and victims. As well, rather than being on the beat in dangerous parts of town, they would be searching for people, though mostly women, acting immorally, particularly in places where men and women came together. They were never tasked with the same duties as their male counterparts, and so were seen more as social workers within the police force than actual members of the force. Through the 1920s, feminists argued that these policewomen were taken on by police for show more than to be actual policewomen, and interest from the upper ranks in policewomen faded along with their interest in social management since the upper ranks saw the two as being deeply connected. A few more women were taken on until after World War II, and those who were there gained little ground for women in the police force.

==== School crossing guards ====
Adult crossing guards at various intersections and crosswalks were employed and paid by the Toronto Police Service; however, as part of a modernization initiative, the crossing guard program was transferred to the City of Toronto in 2017.

== Ranks ==
The rank insignia of the Toronto Police Service is similar to that used by police services elsewhere in Canada and the United Kingdom, except that the usual "pips" are replaced by maple leaves. St. Edward's Crown is found on the insignia of staff sergeant, all superintendent ranks, and all commanding officer ranks.

Rank	Commanding officers		Senior officers				Police officers			Officers in training
Rank	Chief of police	Deputy chief of police	Chief superintendent	Superintendent	Staff inspector	Inspector	Staff sergeant	Sergeant	Constable	Cadet
Insignia (slip-on)										
Insignia (shoulder board)							Shoulder boards not used for these ranks			

=== Commanding Officers ===
The Commanding Officers consist of the Chief of Police, Deputy Chiefs, Chief Information Officer, and Chief Administrative Officer. They head the command pillars of the Toronto Police Service.

- Chief of Police: Chief Myron Demkiw
- Specialized Operations Command: Deputy Chief Robert Johnson
- Community Safety Command: Deputy Chief Lauren Pogue
- Corporate Services Command: Acting Chief Administrative Officer Svina Dhaliwal
- Information Technology Command: Chief Information Officer Colin Stairs

=== Senior Officers ===
The day-to-day and regional operations are commanded by senior officers:

- Chief Superintendent
- Superintendent
- Inspector

=== Investigative Officers ===
Investigations are divided into crimes against persons and crimes against property. These investigations are conducted by:

- Detective Sergeant (equivalent to Staff Sergeant rank)
- Detective (equivalent to Sergeant rank)
- Detective Constable (equivalent to Police Constable rank)

=== Uniformed Patrol Officers ===
- Staff Sergeant
- Sergeant
- Police Constable — first class, second class, third class, fourth class (Recruit / first 6 months)

=== Cadet in training ===
- Cadet

=== Sworn Members ===
- Special Constable — District Special Constable, Court Officer, Booking Officer, Document Service Officer, Custodial Officer
- Parking Enforcement Officers

Ranks

- Location Administrator
- Shift Supervisor
- Supervisor
- Officer

=== Unsworn Civilian Members ===
- Cadet in training
- Station Duty Clerks
- Communication Operators
- Quality Control Clerks
- Inquiry Clerks
- Researchers
- Administrative Clerks
- Crime Scene Support Technician

== Training ==
Toronto Police College
- Type: Police college
- Established: 2009
- Affiliations: Toronto Police Service
- Location: Toronto, Ontario, Canada
- Website: www.torontopolice.on.ca/college/

New and present officers of the Toronto Police Service train at the Toronto Police College in Etobicoke on Birmingham east of Islington. The initial training is three weeks, followed by 12 weeks at the Ontario Police College in Aylmer, Ontario and then nine weeks of final training at Toronto Police College. Charles O. Bick College was closed in July 2009.

== Uniform ==
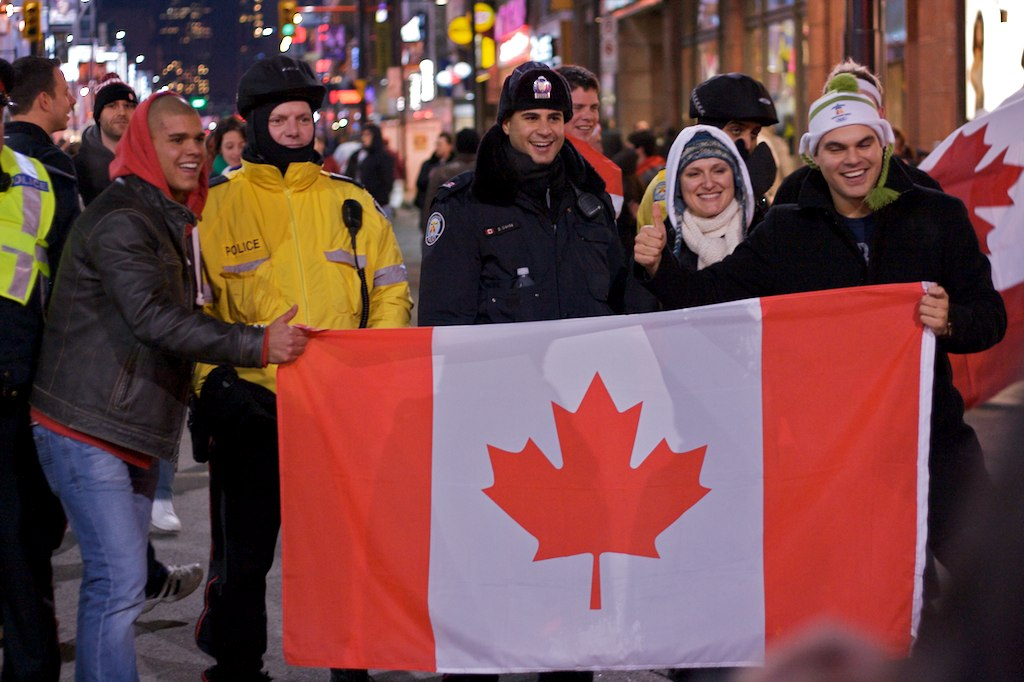
A member of the Toronto Police bicycle unit (wearing a yellow reflective jacket) with another officer dressed in typical winter dress (center), which includes a fur-trim Yukon hat.

Front-line officers wear dark navy-blue shirts, cargo pants (with red stripe), and boots. Winter jackets are either a dark navy blue jacket design–Eisenhower style, single-breasted front closing, two patch type breast pockets, shoulder straps, gold buttons—or yellow windbreaker style with the word POLICE in reflective silver and black at the back (generally worn by the bicycle and traffic services units). All ranks shall wear dark navy blue clip-on ties when wearing long-sleeve uniforms.

Hats can be styled after baseball caps, combination caps, or fur-trim Yukon (similar to the Ushanka) hats for winter. Motorcycle units have white helmets. Black or reflective yellow gloves are also provided to officers with Traffic Services. Front-line officers usually wear baseball caps. Before the 1990s, female officers wore bowler caps instead of combination caps. Auxiliary officers wear combination caps with a checkered red and black band. The Mounted Unit wears a black Canadian military fur wedge cap during the winter months and a custodian helmet for ceremonial use.

As is the case with all Ontario law enforcement officers, uniformed officers wear name tags. They are in the style of "A. Example" where the first letter of the first name is written and the last name next to it, with a Canadian flag to the left of the name. Name tags are usually stitched on with white stitching on a black background, but they also have a pin-style with black lettering on a gold plate.

Senior officers wear white shirts and a black Eisenhower-style jacket. Auxiliary officers wear light blue shirts (long sleeve for winter and short for summer), with the badge of auxiliary on the bottom of the crest. Originally, line officers also wore light blue shirts, but changed to the current navy blue shirts in the Fall of 2000.

== Logo ==
The Toronto Police Service logo is very similar to the old Metropolitan Toronto Police logo. It includes the following components:

- winged wheels of industry on the top part of the shield, representing transportation
- a crown commemorating the coronation year of Queen Elizabeth II in 1953
- two books representing education or knowledge
- a caduceus (herald's staff), which is associated with Mercury, the protector of commerce
- a chevron for housing
- on either side of the shield, a sheaf with a York Rose, representing York County, Ontario, which Toronto served as the county seat from 1834 to 1953
- a circular ribbon with the words "Toronto Police"
- a beaver representing industry and/or Canada, from the old and new coat of arms of Toronto

The shield in the Toronto Police Service logo is from the coat of arms of the former Municipality of Metropolitan Toronto. This was retained after the amalgamation of Toronto, despite the city adopting a new coat of arms in 1999. The TPS logo is also similar to the emblem of the former Metropolitan Toronto School Board. Before the formation of the Metropolitan Toronto Police, the Toronto Police Department officers wore a generic Scully badge on their caps, a common shield used by Canadian police forces in the 19th century and early 20th century. This featured a metallic maple leaf with a beaver and crown.

== Fleet ==
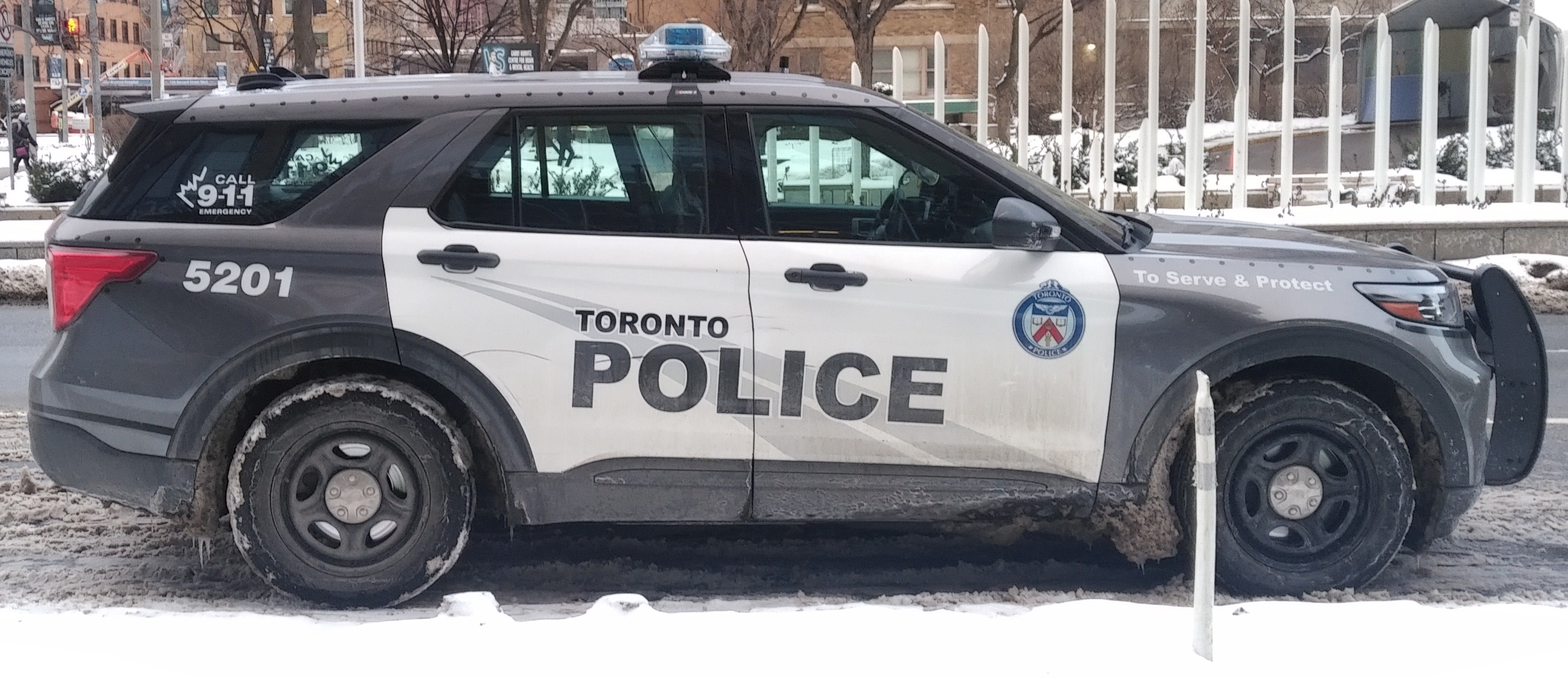
Ford Explorer

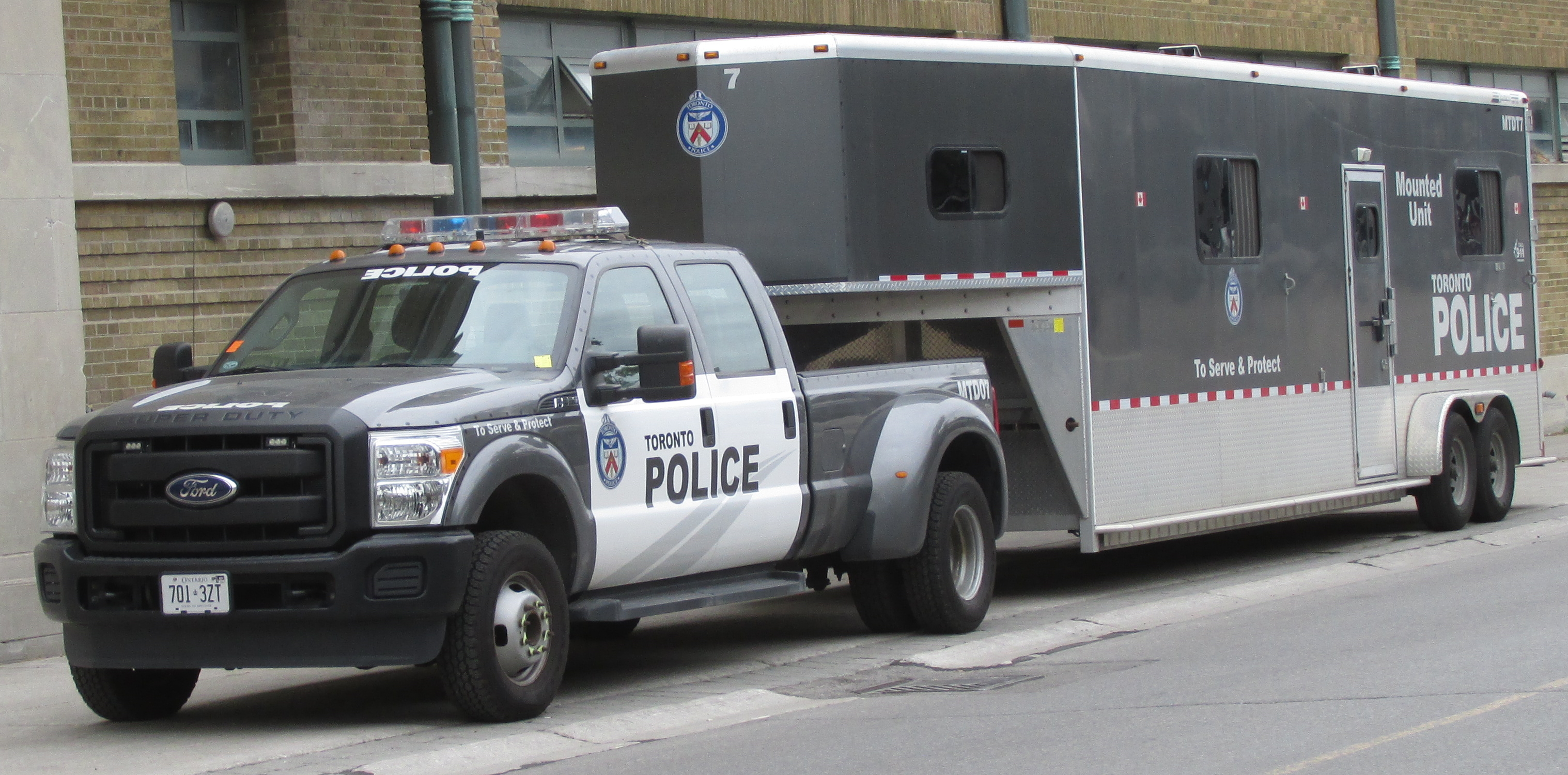
Ford F350 with horse trailer

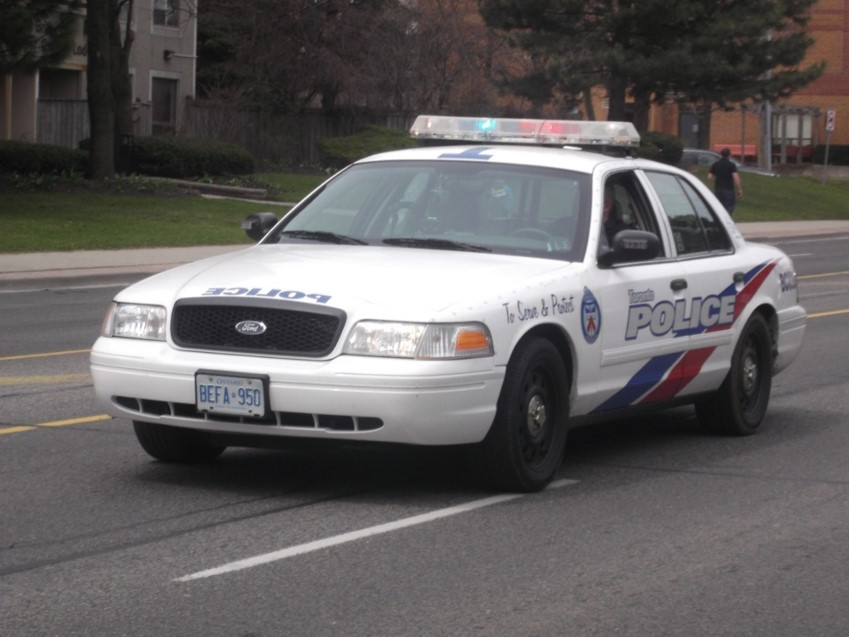
Ford Crown Victoria (2007–2017 livery)

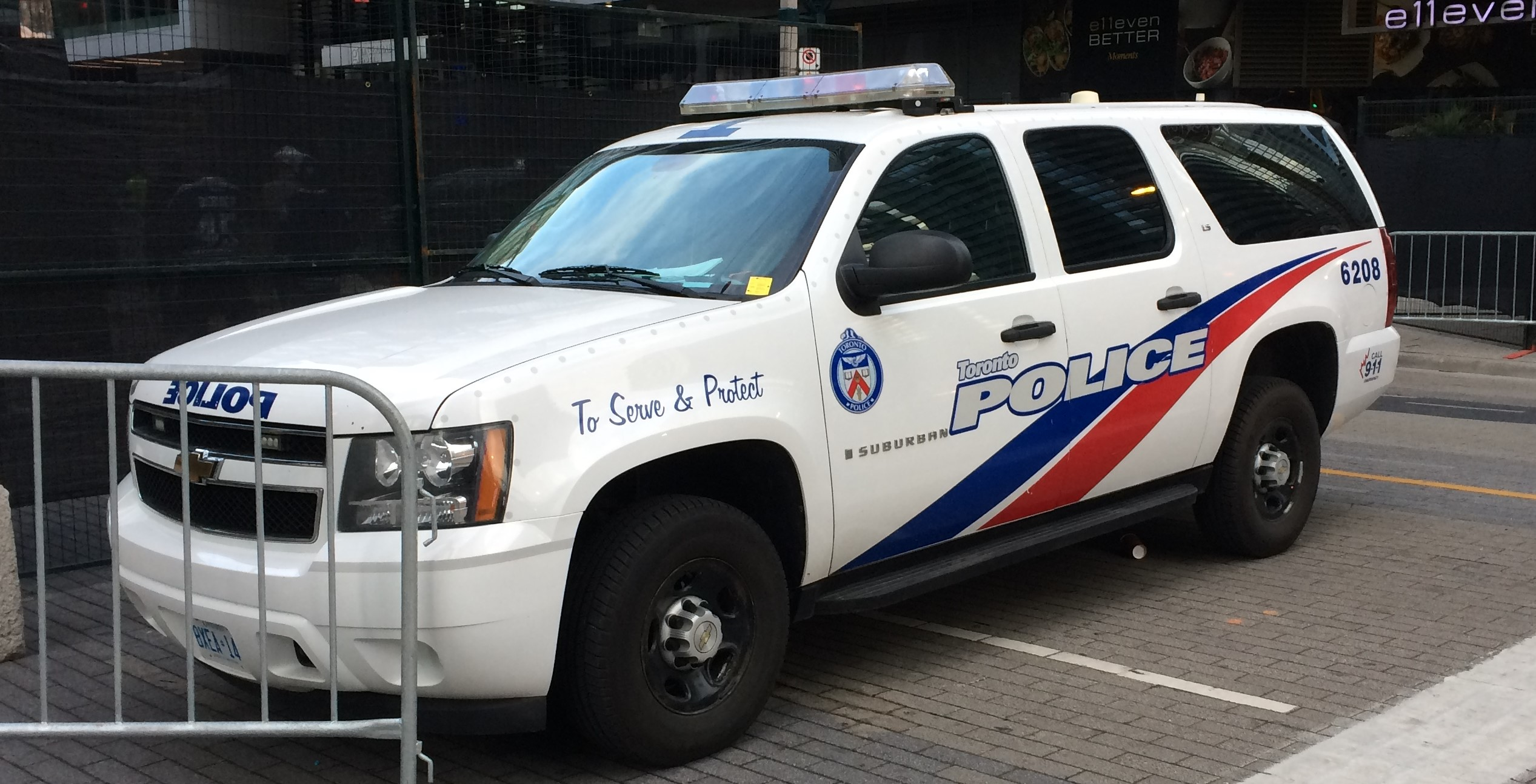
Chevrolet Tahoe (pre-2017 livery)

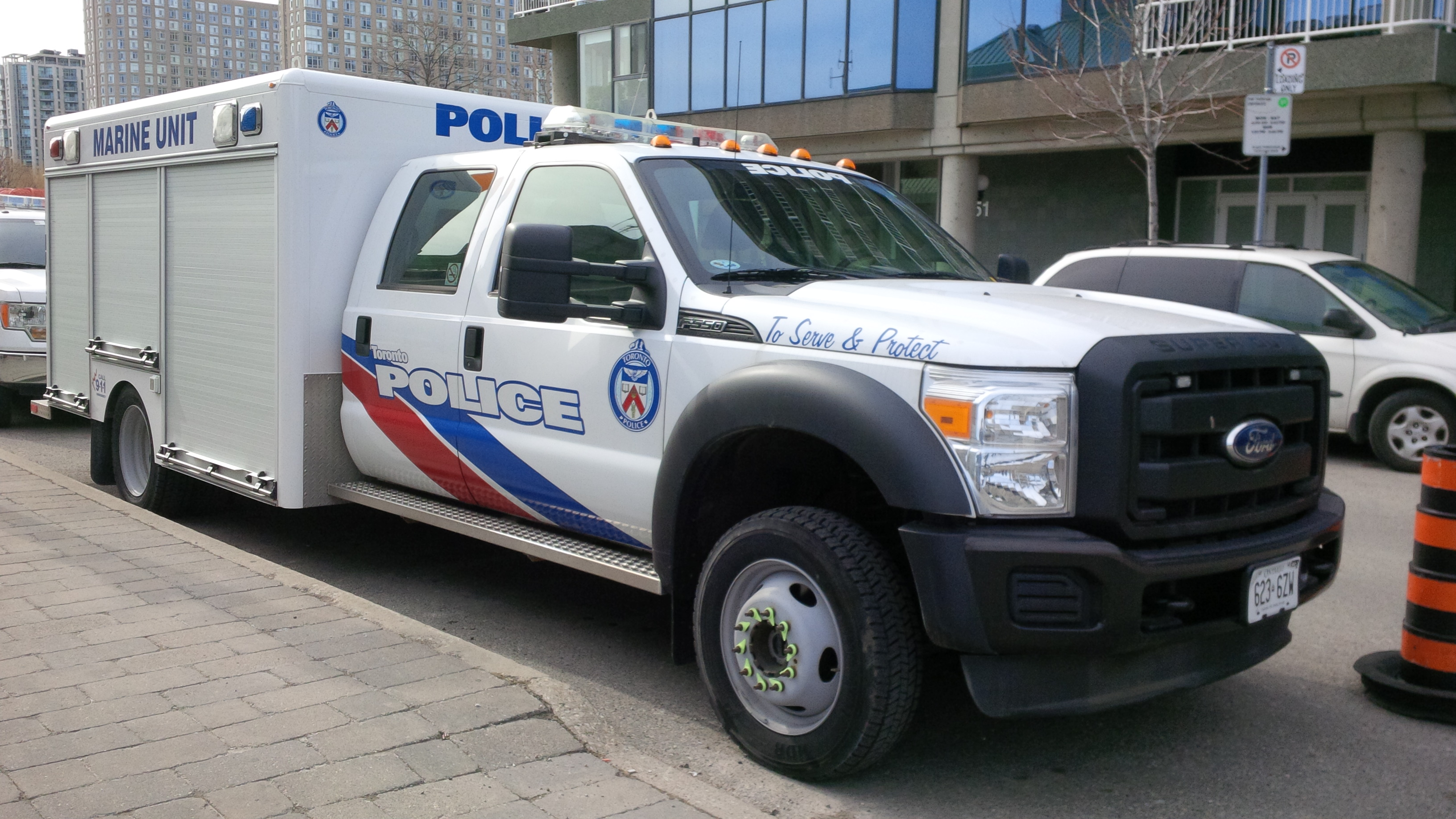
Marine Support Unit

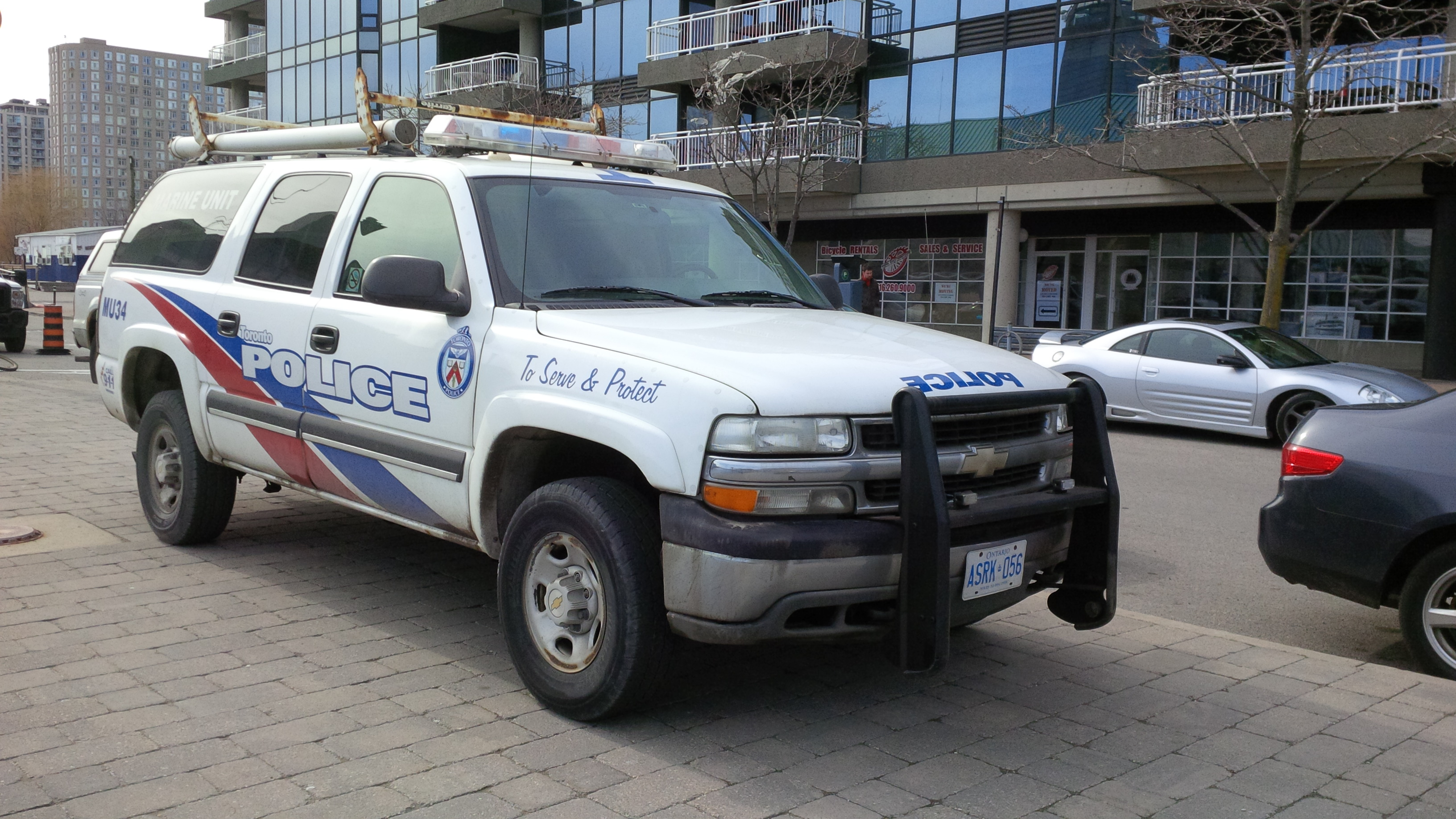
Chevrolet Suburban (pre-2017 livery)

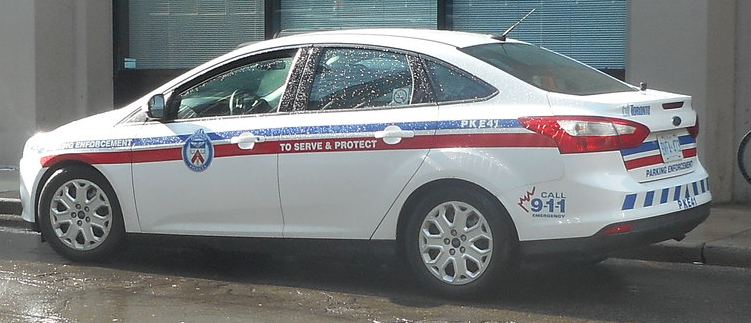
Ford Focus

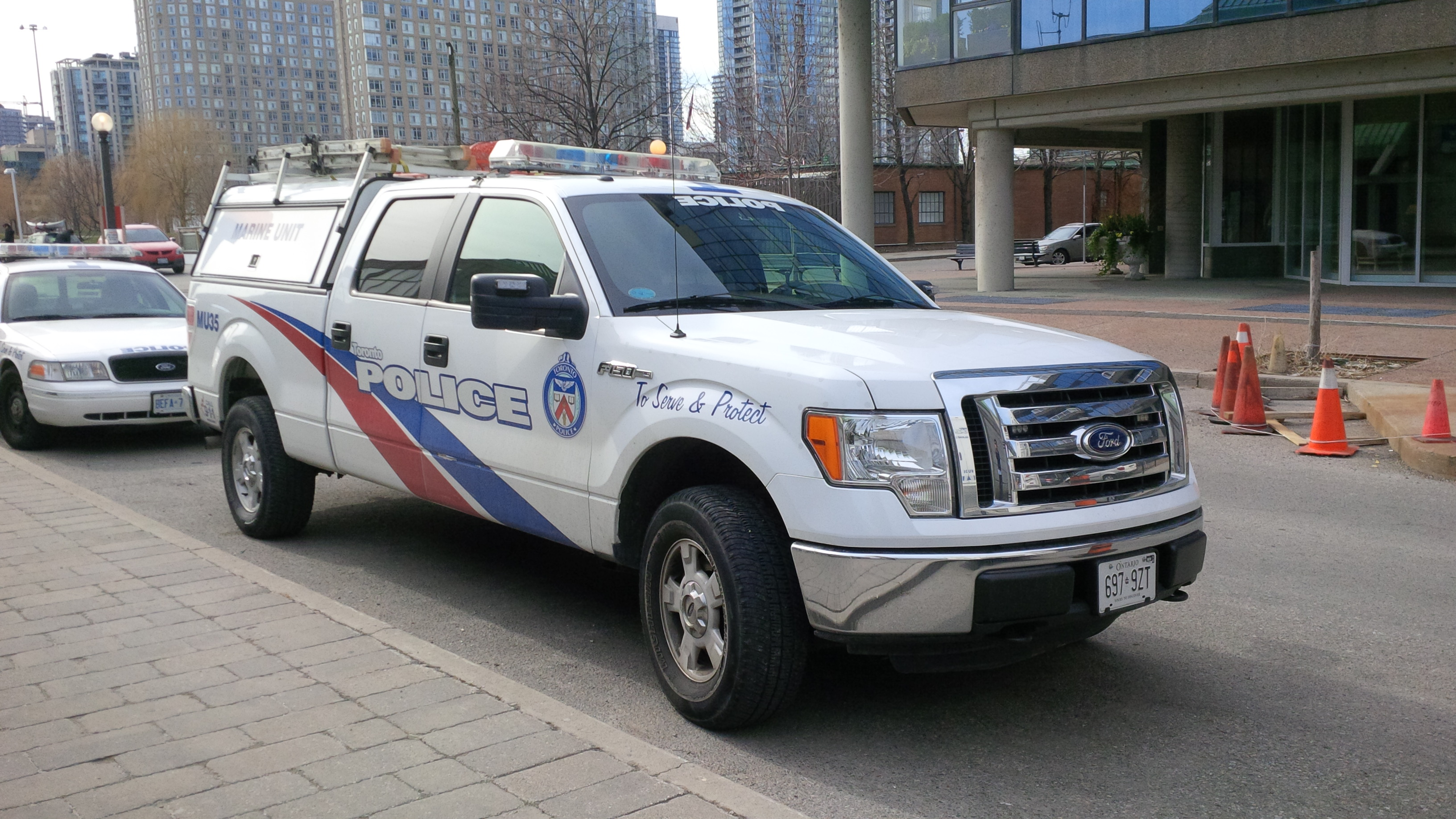
Ford F150 (pre-2017 livery)

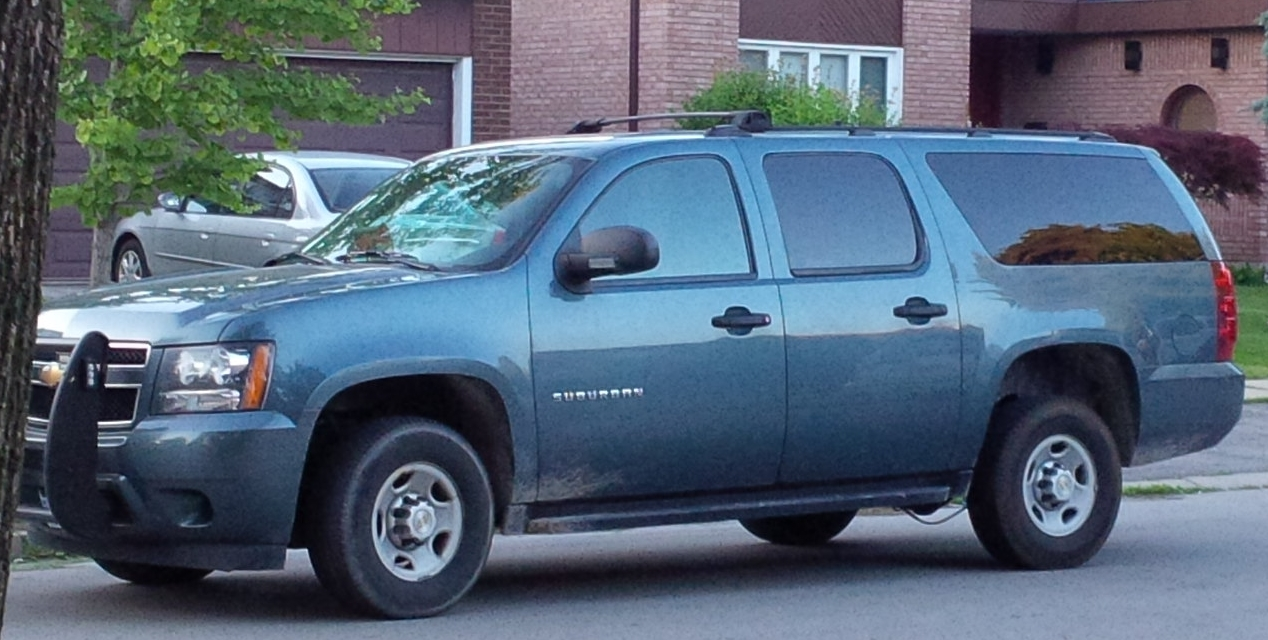
Chevrolet Suburban, unmarked

Police cars, known locally as scout cars, are the standard equipment used by Toronto Police officers for transportation. The vehicles are equipped with a combination of a rotator and an LED lightbar. The vehicles are numbered according to their division and car number. For example, 3322 represents that the vehicle is from the 33 Division, and the following 22 is the vehicle designation number.

The current design, since August 2017, is partly dark grey, with white doors with black text that says "TORONTO POLICE". Briefly, the design was entirely dark grey, with white lettering. The cars were redesigned following public controversy over their low visibility and "militaristic styling". An earlier design sometimes still seen is a white base with red and blue markings, and stealth vehicles are grey with reflective markings. Some fleets, such as parking enforcement, special constables, and court services, still use the pre-2017 white/red/blue livery and have not been updated as of 2022. Some of the photos in this section show this former color scheme. The previous scheme was a yellow base with blue lettering.

Other fleet numbering patterns include:

- All Terrain Vehicle — ##ATVXX (## would be the Division number)
- Area Field Command Unit — AFCXX
- Bail Compliance Unit — BCUXX
- Bike Patrol Unit — ##BXX (## would be the Division number)
- Central Field Command — CFCXX
- Chief of Police — CHIEF
- Command Vehicles — COMDXX
- Court Services — CRTXX
- Courier — RMSXX
- District Special Constable – ##9X
- Duty Officer (highest ranking inspector on shift) – DUTYXX
- Emergency Task Force — ETFXX
- Explosives Disposal Unit – EDUXX
- Forensic Identification Services — FISXX
- Information Technology Services — ITSXX
- Marine Unit — MUXX
- Mounted Unit Services — MTDXX
- Parking Enforcement — PKEXX (East) / PKWXX (West)
- Police Dog Services — PDXX
- Primary Response Group — 87XX
- Public Safety Response Team (replaced TAVIS) — PSRTXX
- Public Safety Unit — PSUXX
- School Resource Officer — SROXX
- (Marine) Service Vehicle — SRVX
- Spare Vehicles — 7XX
- Supervisor Vehicles — ##SX (## would be the Division number or Unit Identifier)
- Toronto Police Tow Trucks — 8XX
- Traffic Services — 6XXX / 80XX (Stealth)
- Video Services Unit — VSUXX
- Jeffery Northrup Commemoration Vehicle – 99201

=== Motor vehicles ===
The Toronto Police Service has about 500 vehicles in its fleet.

Make/model	Type	Origin
Ford Crown Victoria	(marked) General police vehicle, Traffic Services, Community Sweeper Unit	Canada
Ford Police Interceptor Sedan (Ford Taurus) Police Interceptor	(marked) General police vehicle, Traffic Services, Community Sweeper Unit	United States
Ford Interceptor Utility	(marked) Supervisor Truck, Traffic Services, Special Operations	United States
Dodge Charger Pursuit	(marked) General police vehicle, Traffic Services,	Canada
Volkswagen New Beetle	Safety Bug car	Mexico
Honda Civic/Civic Hybrid	Parking Enforcement car	Canada/Japan
Chevrolet Malibu (2001–2005)	Community Sweeper Unit car	United States
Chevrolet Malibu (2006)	Parking Enforcement Unit	Canada
Smart fortwo	Parking Enforcement car	France
Ford Focus	Parking Enforcement car	United States
Harley-Davidson FLHTP	motorcycle	United States
Ford F-150 Responder	Commercial Vehicle Inspections Unit	United States

In August 2018, TPS acquired TTC Orion VII buses 7900–7905 for purposes such as roadblocks, mass transport, and training. These units are now numbered ES-0 through ES-5. ES stands for Events Support. The following units were painted black before being sent to TPS. In November 2018, these units were repainted in a gray and white livery similar to the LFLRV livery on TTC vehicles. The following units are maintained and stored by the TTC. They are currently stored at Birchmount Garage in Scarborough.

=== Watercraft ===
Unit #	Make	Type
Marine Unit 1	Hike Industry (Wheatley, ON)	Dive Platform & Command Vessel marine boat with Volvo Penta Turbo Chargd 350 hp (260 kW) engines and crane.
Marine Unit 3	Tyler Nelson design built by Bristol Marine (Port Credit, ON)	400 hp Long Range Search and Rescue Vessel
Marine Unit 4	Hike Industry	patrol boat
Marine Unit MTB 5	James J. Taylor & Sons (Toronto, ON)	c. 1941 wooden motor boat—patrol boat with 225 hp gas engine
Marine Unit 7	Hike Industry	patrol boat
MTB 11	Ruliff Grass Construction Co. Ltd (Richmond Hill ON)	work boat, ex-Toronto Harbour Police 11 c 1968
SRV1	Unknown	Service vessel/patrol boat
Marine Unit 21–23	Zodiac Hurricane	30-foot (9.1 m) Zodiac Rigid-hulled inflatable boat (RIBs) with twin 300 horsepower (220 kW) four-stroke motors
Marine Unit 12 / 1 Husky	Biondo Boats (La Crosse, WI)	SR-19 Husky Airboat for ice operations
Marine Unit 20	Zodiac	28-foot (8.5 m) Zodiac with a Covered Wheelhouse, Twin Turbo-Diesel Jet Drive Engines
MU 8–9	Bombardier Recreational Products Sea-Doo GTX-4	personal watercraft
	Brunswick Corporation patrol boats	75 hp engine
MU-15	Boston Whaler patrol boat	75 hp engine used by Toronto Lifeguard Service
	Lowe Boats small metal boat	for inland water rescue
Wahoo Marine boat	5m 50 hp rescue boat	
	Unknown	rowboats used by Toronto Police Lifeguard Service at select beaches along Lake Ontario
	Unknown	Paddleboards used by the Toronto Police Lifeguard Service
	Unknown	Kayak used by Toronto Police Lifeguard Service
	Zodiac Military & Professional Products	inflatable zodiac workboat with 25 hp engine
	Air Rider Hovercraft International	air cushion rescue vehicle

=== Support vehicles ===
Make/model	Type	Origin
Chevrolet Express	van—Commercial Vehicle Enforcement, Collision Reconstruction, Public Safety Unit, CBRNE Response, Forensic Identification Services	United States
GMC Savanna	vans—Radio Services and Court Services	United States
GMC C series light truck	Emergency Task Force	United States
Chevrolet Suburban	SUV—Emergency Task Force, Marine Unit, Police Dog Service, Public Safety Unit, Mounted Unit, Collision Reconstruction, Forensic Identification Services	United States
Ford Expedition	SUV—Emergency Task Force, Police Dog Services, Forensic Identification Services	United States
Ford F350	pickup truck with horses trailer—Mounted Unit	United States
Ford F150	Pickup Truck—Emergency Task Force, Marine Unit, Mounted Unit, Public Safety Unit	United States
Armet Armoured Vehicles Incorporated/Ford Trooper—using F-550 chassis	Tactical vehicle—Emergency Task Force	Canada/United States
Ford Econoline Van	Explosive Disposal Unit, Forensic Identification Services, Court Services, Commercial Vehicle Enforcement	United States
Ford F-series or GMC Vandura trucks	Prisoner Transportation Services Court Wagons (Retired)	Canada
Freightliner Trucks FL mobile	mobile command unit	United States
Ford F-series truck chassis	tow truck	United States
Ford Van	van RIDE	United States
GMC Safari	Van Parking Enforcement	United States
Jeep Cherokee	SUV – Retired	United States
Northrop Grumman Remotec Andros MK V1A and Andros F6B	bomb unit robots	United States
General Motors Diesel Division T6H −5307 series	Metro Police Auxiliary AUX1 and AUX 2 bus—ex-Toronto Transit Commission 7960	Canada
Motor Coach Industries MCI 102A	2 recruitment buses	Canada
Motor Coach Industries MCI-9	bus	Canada
Orion Bus Industries Orion VII Diesel	Bus- used as a roadblock or mass transport	Canada
Community Relations trailer—community donated	trailer	Canada

=== Bicycles ===
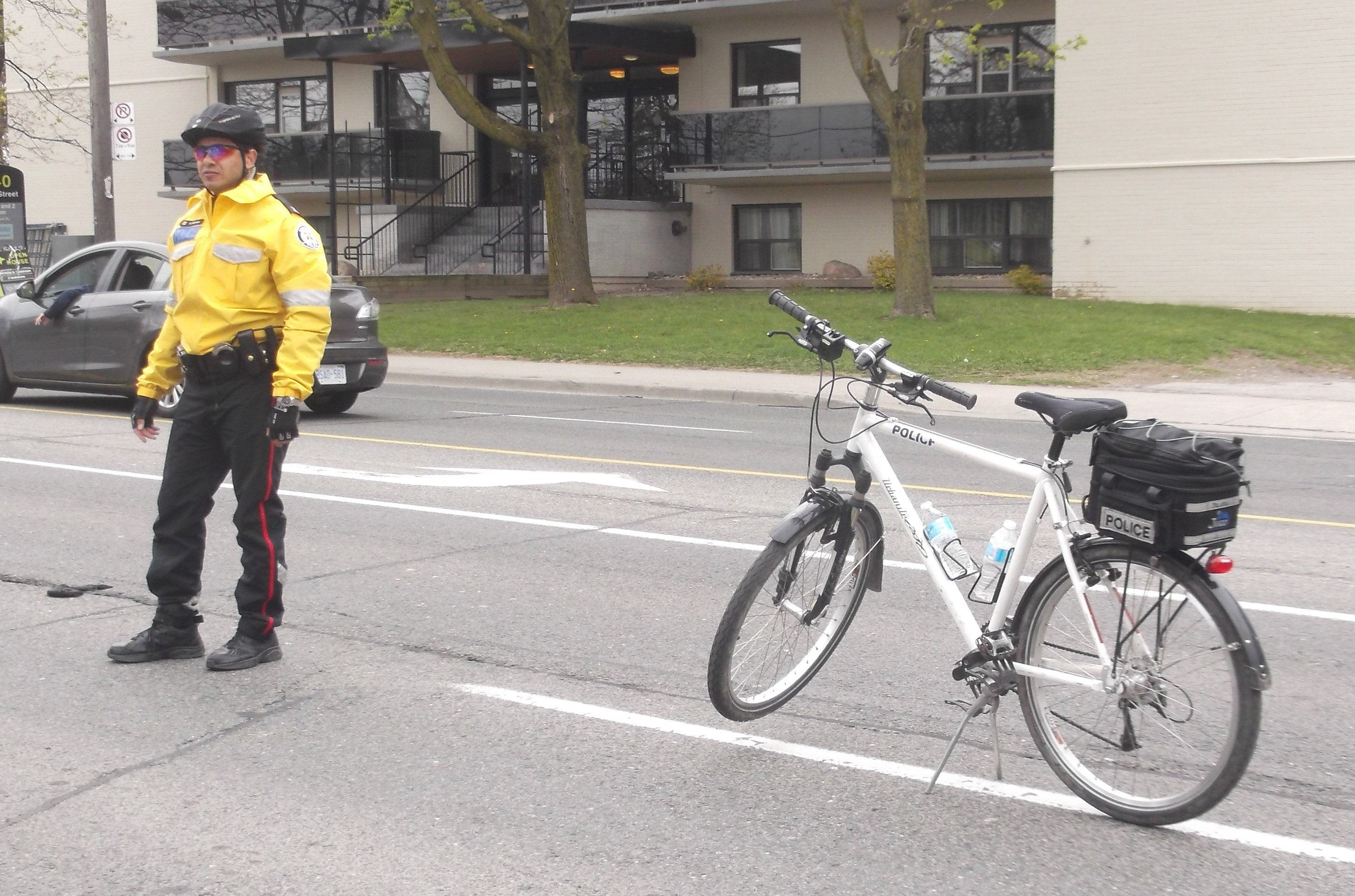
Bicycle unit

Make/model	Type	Origin
Norco Bicycles Cross Country	mountain bike	Taiwan
Aquila Scandium	mountain bike—Community Response Unit	

=== Aircraft ===
An unmarked Cessna 206 H (C-FZRR) was registered with the Toronto Police Service and has been used for undisclosed surveillance work. The plane has been alleged to have been used during the Rob Ford substance abuse scandal. C-FZRR was sold in 2015 to Sky Photo Techniques. Air support (helicopter) is provided by York Regional Police through a mutual support agreement.

== Equipment ==
Model	Type	Origin	User
Taser 7	Conducted Energy Weapon	United States	Standard issue
Taser X2	Conducted Energy Weapon	United States	Standard issue
Glock 22 Gen 3 and 4	Semi-automatic pistol	Austria	Regular uniformed officers
Glock 27	Semi-automatic pistol	Austria	Detectives
Glock 17	Semi-automatic pistol	Austria	Emergency Task Force
Glock 19	Semi-automatic pistol	Austria	Emergency Task Force
Heckler & Koch MP5A3	Submachine gun	Germany	Emergency Task Force
CZ Scorpion Evo 3	Submachine gun	Czech Republic	In use
Remington 870	Shotgun	United States	Standard issue
Mossberg M500	Shotgun	United States	Standard issue
Colt Canada C8	Assault rifle	Canada	Standard issue
Remington 700	Sniper rifle	United States	Emergency Task Force
Long-range acoustic device	Loudspeaker	United States	Marine Unit and Public Safety Unit

== See also ==
- Heavy Urban Search and Rescue
- History of crime in Toronto
- Integrated Security Unit
- Reduce Impaired Driving Everywhere
- TTC Special Constable Services
- Toronto Community Housing Corporation Community Safety Unit Special Constables
- Toronto Police Service Youth in Policing Initiative
- Law & Order Toronto: Criminal Intent
- Rookie Blue: TV series about five recruits of 15th division of Toronto Police.
