= Chief of the Toronto Police Service =

Head police officer of the Toronto Police Service

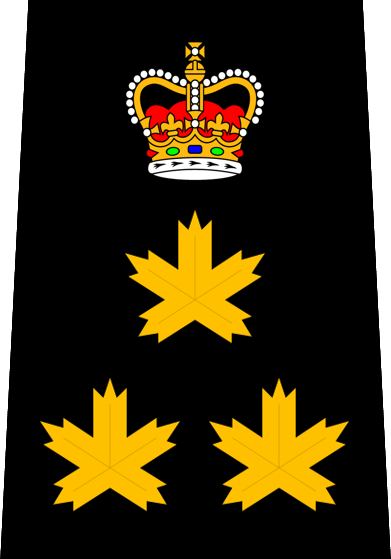
- Toronto Police Service emblem (top) and Chief of Police rank slip (bottom)

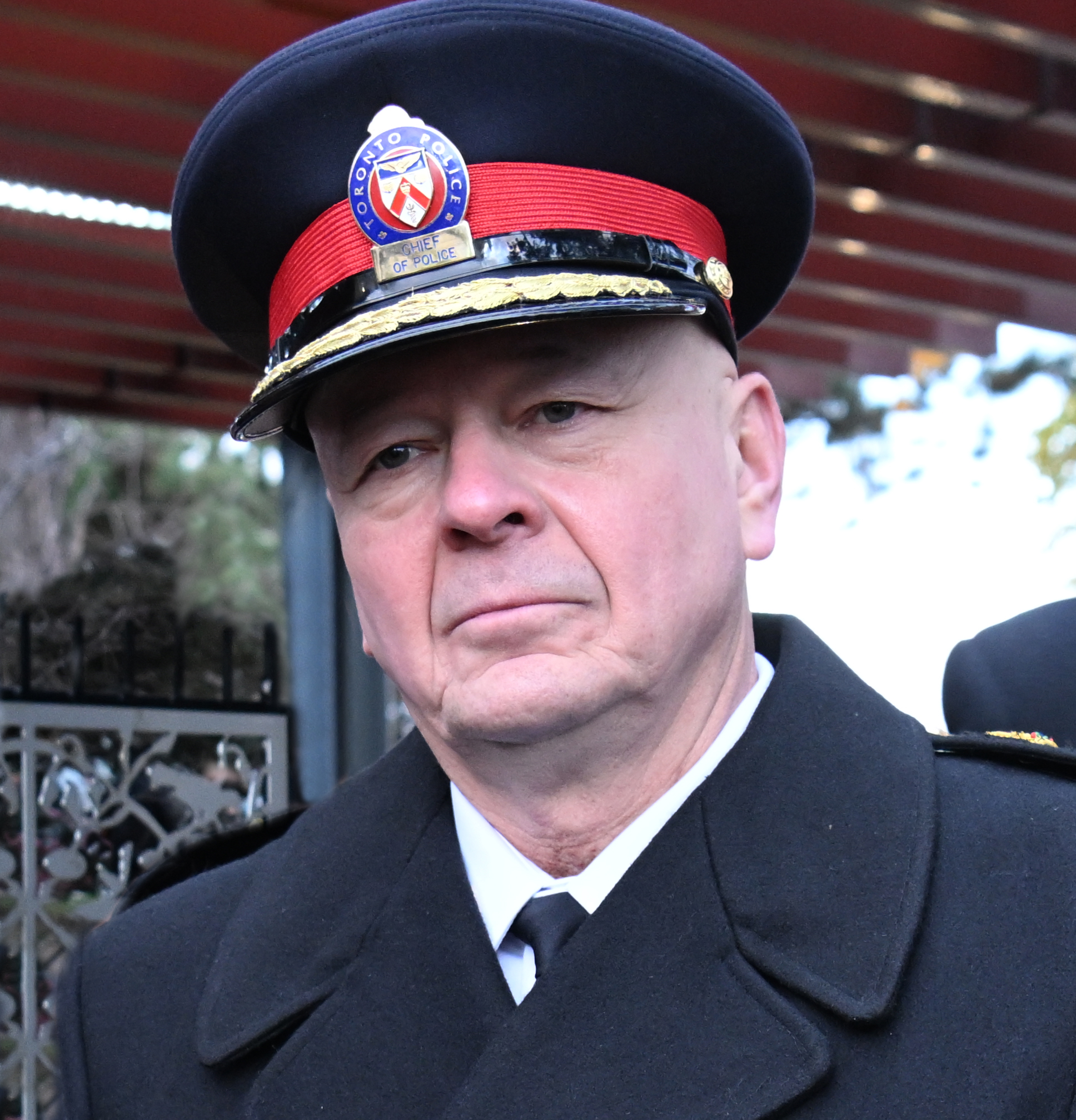
- Incumbent; Myron Demkiw since December 19, 2022
- Toronto Police Service
- Reports to: Toronto Police Services Board
- Appointer: Toronto Police Services Board
- Constituting instrument: Community Safety and Policing Act, 2019 (SO 2019, c. 1, Sched. 1)
- Inaugural holder: William Higgins
- Formation: 1834
- Website: tps.ca/chief

The chief of the Toronto Police Service is the professional head of the Toronto Police Service (TPS). Under the direction of the Toronto Police Services Board, the chief is responsible for the management and administration of the police service's operations.

Myron Demkiw is the current chief of police, having assumed office on December 19, 2022.

== Overview ==
Section 41 of the Police Services Act legally defines the role of police chiefs in Ontario. Under this law, the chief is responsible for administering the police force and overseeing its operation in accordance with the objectives, priorities and policies established by the board, ensuring that members of the police force carry out their duties in accordance with the Police Services Act in a manner that reflects the needs of the community, maintaining discipline in the police force, ensuring that the police force provides community-oriented police services, and administering the complaints system.

The Toronto Police Services Board recruits and dismisses the chief. Day-to-day policing and operational decisions of the Toronto Police Service are made by the chief, but must be consistent with the policies and objectives set by the Toronto Police Services Board.

== History ==
The position was known as "high constable" when the Toronto Police Department was formed until 1859 and then as "chief constable" until 1957, when the Toronto Police Department was amalgamated with 12 other Toronto-area forces to form the Metropolitan Toronto Police.

== List of chiefs of police ==
High constables, chief constables and chiefs of police in Toronto
Agency	Title	Name	Tenure	Notes	Ref
Toronto Police Department (1834–1956)	High Constable	William Higgins	1834		
Toronto Police Department (1834–1956)	High Constable	George Kingsmill	1835		
Toronto Police Department (1834–1956)	High Constable	James Stitt	1836		
Toronto Police Department (1834–1956)	High Constable	George Kingsmill	1837–1846		
Toronto Police Department (1834–1956)	High Constable	George Allen	1847–1852		
Toronto Police Department (1834–1956)	High Constable	Samuel Sherwood	1852–1858		
Toronto Police Department (1834–1956)	Chief Constable	William Stratton Prince	1859–1873		
Toronto Police Department (1834–1956)	Chief Constable	Frank C. Draper	1874–1886		
Toronto Police Department (1834–1956)	Chief Constable	H. J. Grasett	1886–1920	Longest serving chief	
Toronto Police Department (1834–1956)	Chief Constable	Samuel Dickson	1920–1928		
Toronto Police Department (1834–1956)	Chief Constable	Dennis Draper	1928–1946		
Toronto Police Department (1834–1956)	Chief Constable	John Chisholm	1946–1956		
Metropolitan Toronto Police (1957–1998)	Chief of Police	John Chisholm	1957–1958		
Metropolitan Toronto Police (1957–1998)	Chief of Police	James Page Mackey	1958–1970		
Metropolitan Toronto Police (1957–1998)	Chief of Police	Harold Adamson	1970–1980		
Metropolitan Toronto Police (1957–1998)	Chief of Police	Jack Ackroyd	1980–1984		
Metropolitan Toronto Police (1957–1998)	Chief of Police	Jack Marks	1984–1989		
Metropolitan Toronto Police (1957–1998)	Chief of Police	William McCormack	1989–1995		
Toronto Police Service (1998–present)	Chief of Police	David Boothby	1995–2000	Last chief of the Metro Police; first chief of the Toronto Police Service	
Toronto Police Service (1998–present)	Chief of Police	Julian Fantino	2000–2005		
Toronto Police Service (1998–present)	Chief of Police	Mike Boyd	2005	Interim	
Toronto Police Service (1998–present)	Chief of Police	Bill Blair	2005–2015		
Toronto Police Service (1998–present)	Chief of Police	Mark Saunders	2015–2020		
Toronto Police Service (1998–present)	Chief of Police	James Ramer	2020–2022	Interim	
Toronto Police Service (1998–present)	Chief of Police	Myron Demkiw	2022–present		
