= Stitt =

Stitt is a surname. Notable people with the surname include:

- Alex Stitt (1937–2016), Australian cartoonist
- Allan J. Stitt (born 1961), Canadian arbitrator, mediator and film producer
- Andre Stitt (born 1958), Irish performance artist
- Bernard Munroe Stitt (1880–1942), Canadian politician
- Bob Stitt (born 1964), American football coach
- Donald K. Stitt (1944–2014), American politician from Wisconsin
- Frank Stitt, American chef & cookbook writer
- Garren Stitt (born 2003), American actor and singer
- Georgia Stitt (born 1972), American composer and lyricist
- James Stitt (disambiguation), multiple people, including:
  - James Stitt (high constable), (1804–1891), Irish-born High Constable of Toronto
  - James C. Stitt (1866–1949), American architect
  - James Herbert Stitt (1891–1958), Canadian politician and lawyer
- John Stitt (1894–1976), American college football player and coach
- Kevin Stitt, American businessman and current governor of Oklahoma
- King Stitt (1940–2012), Jamaican musician
- Milan Stitt (1941–2009), American playwright and educator
- Sam Stitt (born 1981), American rower
- Sonny Stitt (1924–1982), American jazz saxophonist

== See also ==
- Stitt House, Hot Springs, Arkansas
- David Stitt Mound, near Chillicothe, Ohio
- Stitt, Ratlinghope, Shropshire
