= James Stitt =

James Stitt may refer to:

- James Stitt (high constable) (1804–1891), Irish-born High Constable of Toronto
- James C. Stitt (1866–1949), American architect
- James Herbert Stitt (1891–1958), Canadian politician and lawyer
