= Francis Collier Draper =

Canadian police chief (1837–1894)

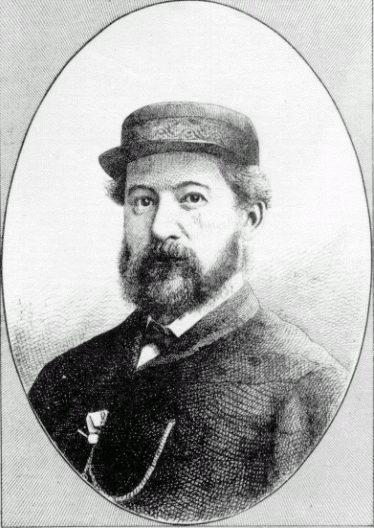

Chief Constable of the Toronto Police Department
- In office 1874–1886
- Preceded by: William Stratton Prince
- Succeeded by: H.J. Grasett

Personal details
- Born: March 3, 1837 Toronto, Upper Canada
- Died: July 25, 1894 (aged 57) Toronto, Ontario
- Spouse(s): Mary Catherine Baines; Elsie Draper
- Relations: William Henry Draper, father William George Draper, brother
- Children: Mary Augusta Catherine Draper

Francis Collier Draper (March 3, 1837 in Toronto – July 25, 1894) was Chief Constable of Toronto beginning 16 January 1874.

== Family and education ==
He was the son of William Henry Draper, Solicitor General, Chief Justice and head of the Ontario government for some years. His mother was Augusta White. He married twice, first to Mary Catherine Baines (died 1872) the daughter of Thomas Baines, Secretary of the Clergy Corporation, and had a child, Mary Augusta Catherine Draper. His second wife was Elsie, widow of Henry Routh. There were no children of the second marriage.

Draper was educated at Upper Canada College and Rensselaer Polytechnic Institute in Troy, N.Y.

== Career ==
He was called to the bar in 1867. He was a Major in The Queen's Own Rifles and an active sportsman. Draper was also a freemason and served as registrar of the provincial grand lodge. Draper became Police Chief of Toronto on 16 January 1874. He continued in this role for 12 years resigning only due to ill health.
