= Liberty Village =

- Neighbourhood
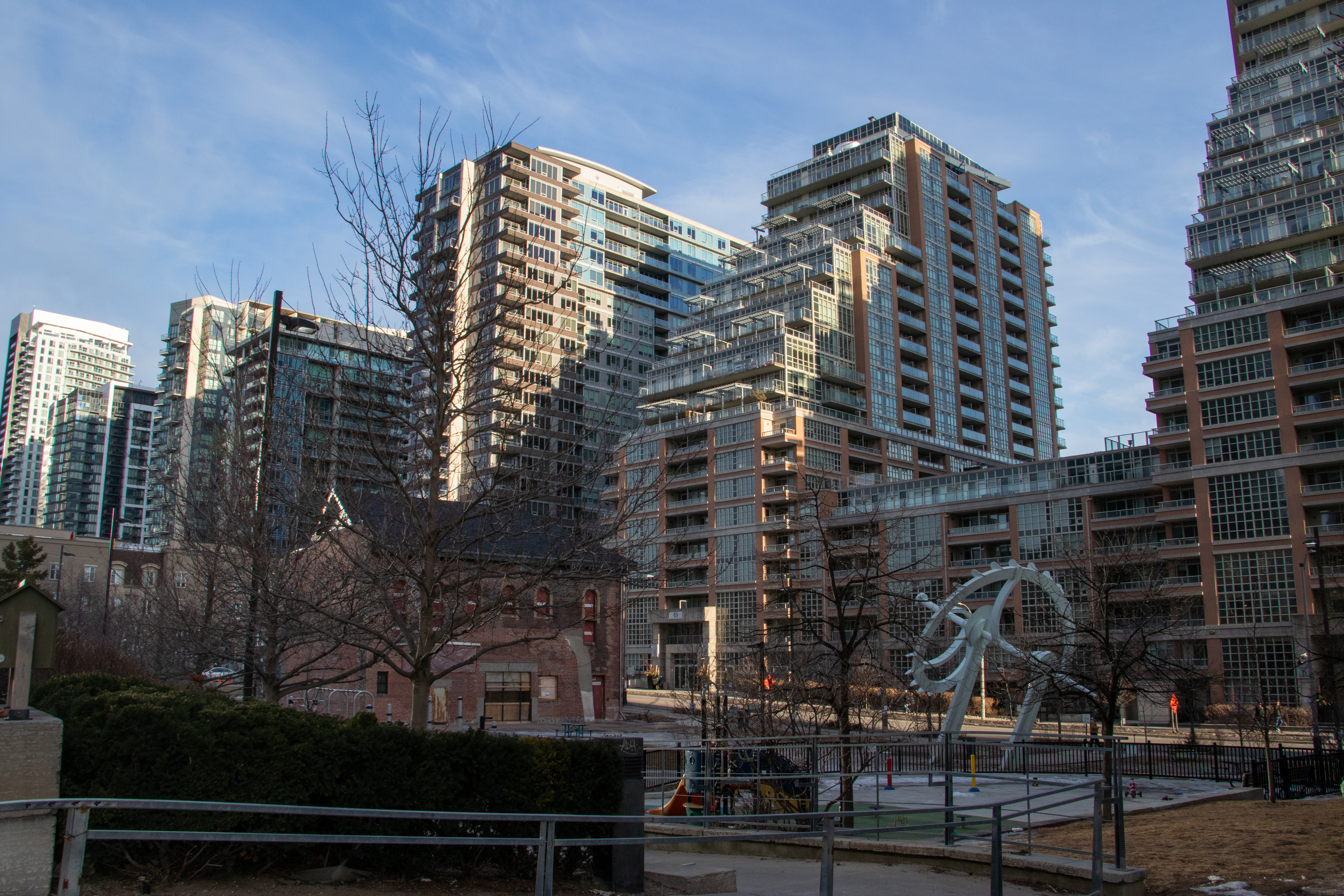
- Liberty Village in 2025

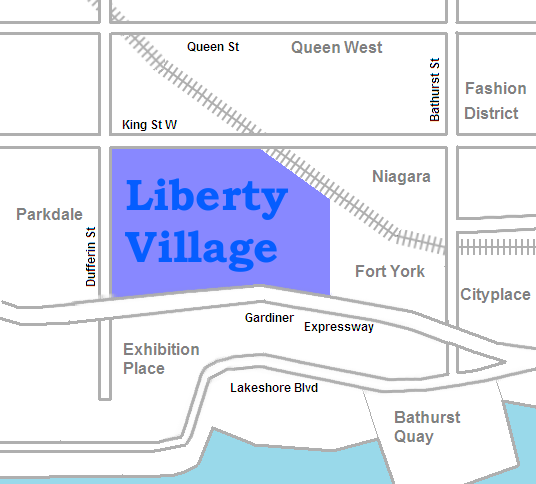
- Vicinity of Liberty Village

- Location within Toronto
- Coordinates: 43.637°N 79.422°W
- Country: Canada
- Province: Ontario
- City: Toronto

Area
  - Total: 0.594 km^{2} (0.229 sq mi)

Population (2016)
  - Total: 7,836
  - Density: 13,192/km^{2} (34,170/sq mi)

Liberty Village is a neighbourhood in Toronto, Ontario, Canada. It is bordered to the north by King Street West, to the west by Dufferin Street, to the south by the Gardiner Expressway, to the east by Strachan Avenue, and to the northeast by railway tracks.

== History ==
In the 1850s, both the Toronto, Grey and Bruce Railway and the Great Western Railway laid tracks across the community, cutting it off from rest of the city and altering plans to develop the area for residential purposes. Instead, Liberty Village became home to several institutions, including the Toronto Central Prison, opened in 1873, and the Andrew Mercer Reformatory for Women (on the site of today's Lamport Stadium), opened in 1878 for women convicted of "vagrancy", "incorrigibility", or "sexual precociousness." Provincial Secretary William John Hanna forced the closure of Central Prison in 1915, and all its buildings were demolished except for the paint shop and the Toronto Central Prison Chapel. "Liberty Street", for which Liberty Village is named, was the first street convicts from the two prisons would walk once freed.

The area's proximity to the railway tracks led to its growth as an industrial area. In 1884, John Inglis and Company opened a factory to manufacture heavy machinery, boilers, and later, electrical appliances. Inglis' success led to its expansion onto Central Prison lands. In 1891, Massey-Harris (later Massey Ferguson) built a factory to produce agricultural implements. Other companies that established in the late 19th century included Toronto Carpet Manufacturing, St. David's Wine, and Ontario Wind Engine and Pump.

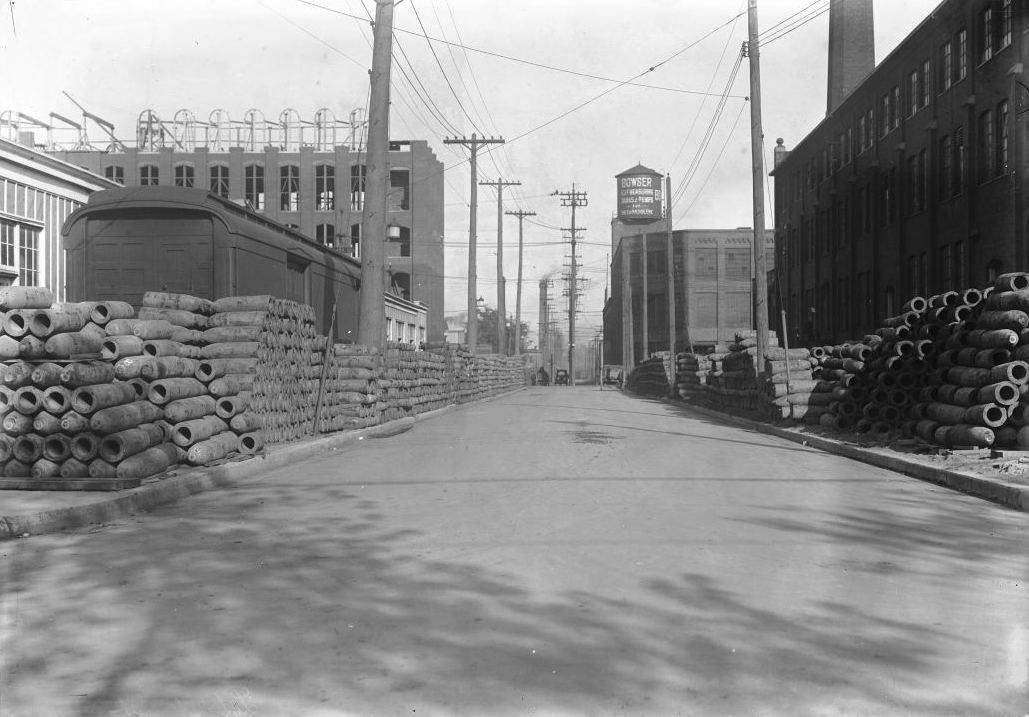
Bombs stored on Liberty Street, looking east from Dufferin Street during the First World War. Industry flourished in the area during the early 20th century.

Industry continued to flourish during the early 20th century due to the area's excellent railway access and many spur lines, as well as a plentiful labour supply from nearby Parkdale. New companies included Brunswick-Balke-Collender (manufacturer of billiard tables and bowling alleys), Irwin Toy, Canada Metal, Simmons Bedding, Hinde and Dauch Paper, and Sunbeam Incandescent Lamp (later Canadian General Electric).

Many of the factories produced armaments, bombs, and weapons during both world wars, and much of the soil pollution in the area dates from those periods.

During the late 1970s and early 1980s, manufacturing operations within Liberty Village began to decline due to a shift from rail to road shipping, the need for larger manufacturing facilities, and lower manufacturing costs in suburban or offshore locations. In 1990, the Toronto Carpet Manufacturing plant on Liberty Street shut down, and the Inglis plant (owned by Whirlpool since 1985) ceased operations in 1991. The Inglis factory and Massey-Harris factory (with the exception of 947 King St. West) were demolished. Decreased industrial activity and lower property values caused many Liberty Village buildings to fall into neglect. During the 1970s and '80s the combination of low rent and large industrial spaces attracted visual artists seeking affordable studio space, creating an informal arts enclave.

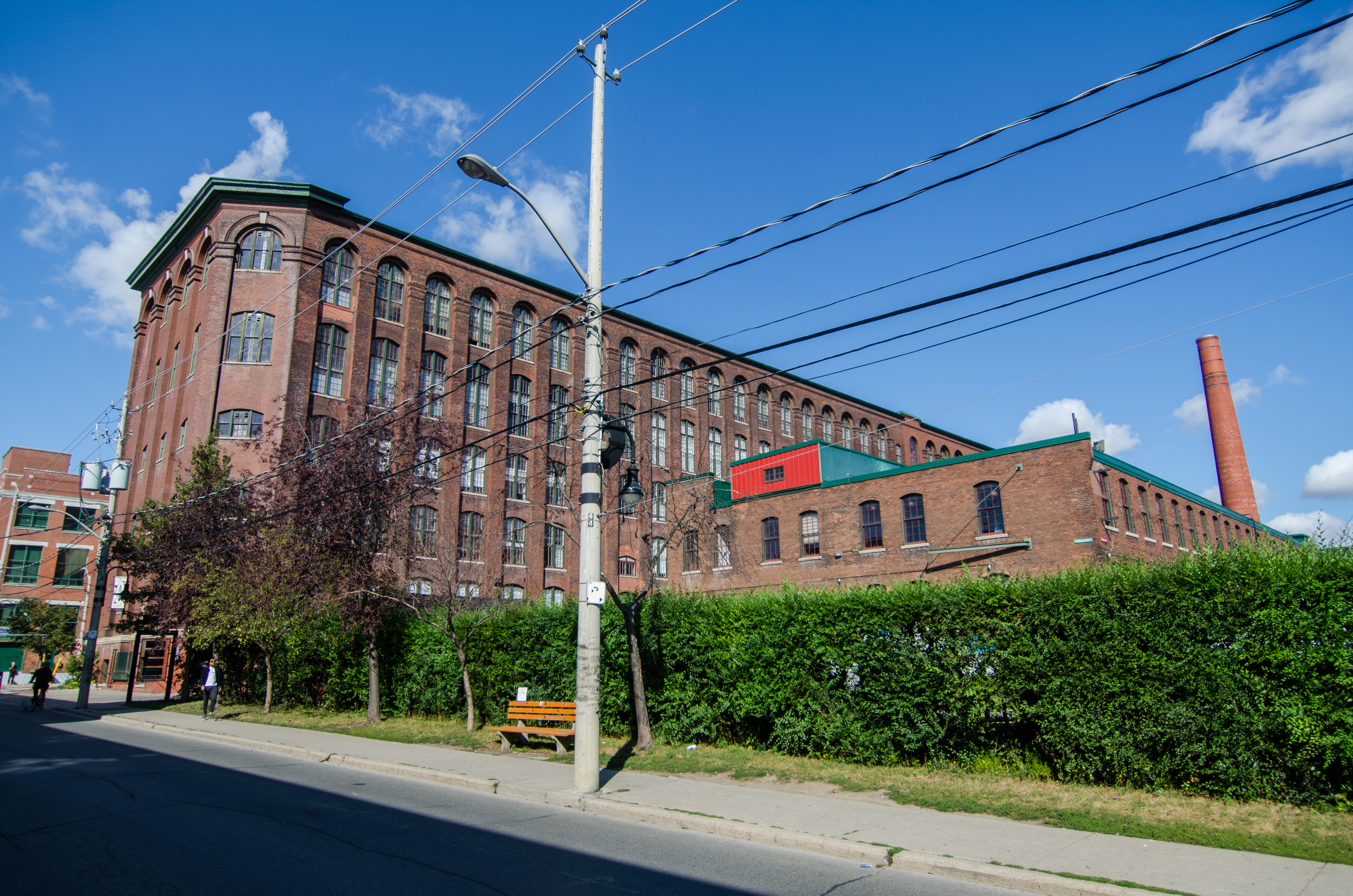
Industrial buildings re-purposed for other uses. Along with other areas of Toronto, Liberty Village experienced a wave of gentrification in the early 21st century.

The Liberty Village Business Improvement Area (BIA) was founded in 2001 and represents over 600 member businesses that together employ more than 10,000 people. Partly because of this, Liberty Village has experienced growth from 2004 to the present in terms of new condos/lofts, office space, a new park, and new shops and restaurants.

The ongoing gentrification of downtown Toronto has been pushing farther outwards from downtown (see Queen Street West, Niagara, Distillery District), encouraging rapid development. It has become a trendy neighbourhood for young professionals and artists pushing farther west for less established areas, while still remaining a short walk or streetcar ride from the core. Many old factories have been repurposed as lofts while others have become restaurants, gyms, furniture stores and galleries, as this area was primarily a former heavy industrial area.

The industrial building that used to house a paper company and up until 2003, the Irwin Toy Factory, was converted into industrial residential lofts and mixed commercial use spaces. The Toronto Carpet Factory Building on Mowat Avenue and its surrounding campus of industrial structures is an example of 1900s' turn-of-the-century industrial architecture and currently houses a mixture of design, technology, media, and marketing companies. Old storage and factory spaces at Liberty Street and Hanna Avenue were converted into commercial spaces in the 1980s and 1990s, and they comprise Liberty Market. The Market houses design firms and collectives, media, technology, and marketing firms, and an eclectic mix of retail stores. Structures from the old Inglis Factory and the former Massey Ferguson Head Office surround the heart of Liberty Village, further testifying to the industrial history of the neighbourhood.

== Community ==
In November 2011, a group of citizens formed the Liberty Village Residents' Association (LVRA) as a collective response to ongoing infrastructure issues and with a stated goal of creating social cohesion amongst the more than 25 000 people who call the Liberty Village area home. Within four years 95% of all condominiums in Liberty Village were members and it created six annual events attended by thousands every year. It has a Facebook Group with more than 14 000 members and an 84.1% participation rate, making it the virtual speakers corner and central information distribution source for the area. It exploded the typical model of residents' associations by being proactively business forward and targeting community interaction. It calls itself a "YIMBY" organization and its growth has been exponential. It is a legal not-for-profit run by volunteers and claims to be the "Largest residents' association in North America". It has attracted significant sponsorship to provide connectivity for the community through events, outreach, and collective responses to neighbourhood and infrastructure issues (transit, daycare, safety). Its current major sponsor is a local Liberty Village communications company, Beanfield Metroconnect.

== Character ==
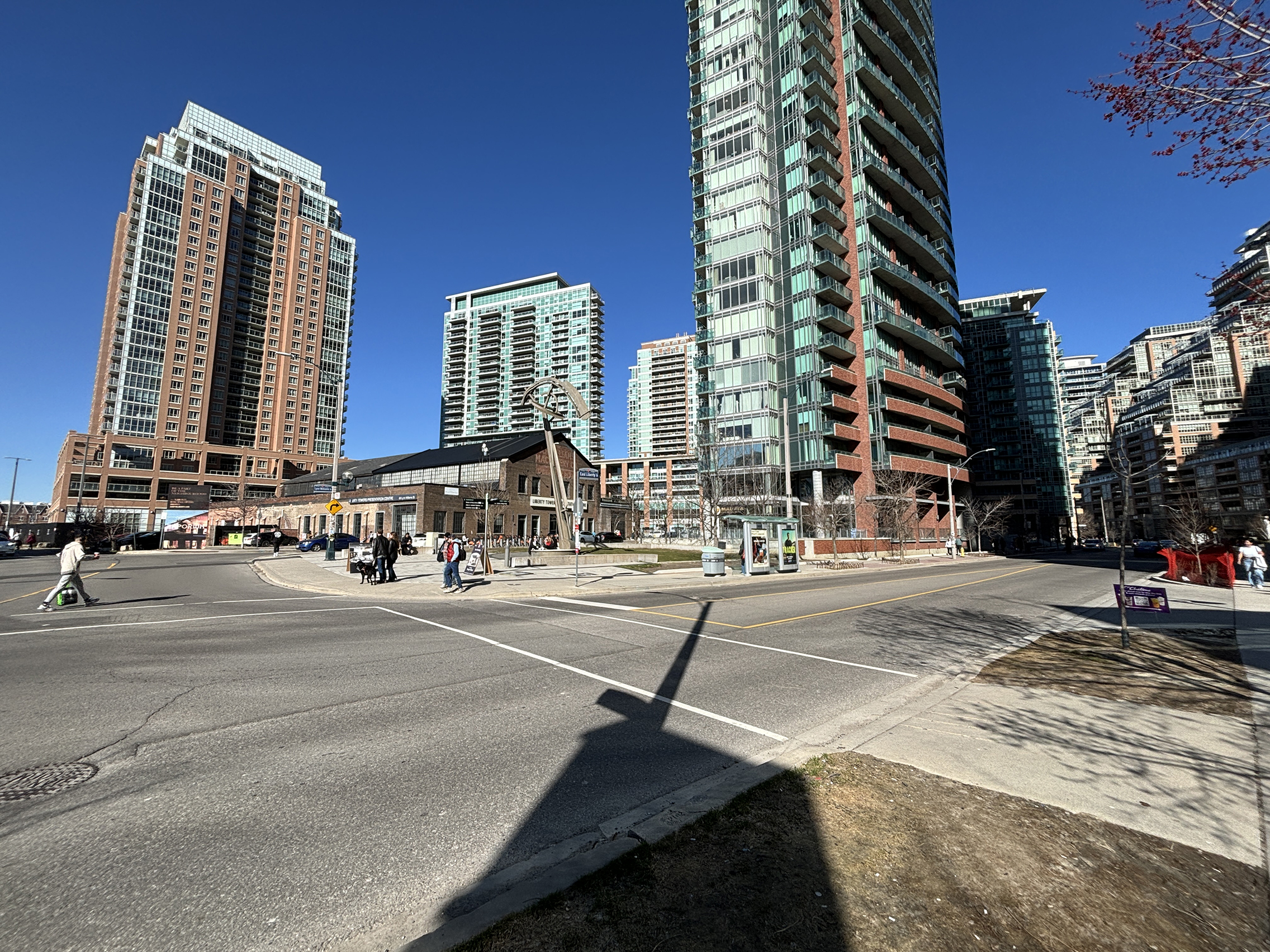
View of East Liberty Street, east of Lynn Williams St. Most new residential developments in Liberty Village are focused along this area.

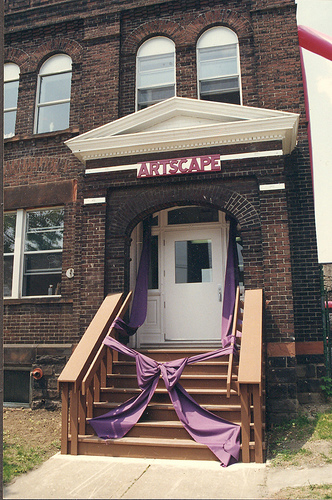
The head offices of Artscape, a non-profit urban development organization, is located in Liberty Village.

=== Landmarks ===
- Lamport Stadium
- Andrew Mercer Reformatory for Women (demolished)

=== Opinion on current residential design ===
In an academic study of Liberty Village prepared by Thorben Wieditz in 2007, he wrote:

The area's makeover is supported by newspaper articles that promote the area as an "artsy loft district," a "bohemian enclave," and a "neighbourhood to live, work and play" for people who want to be close to the entertainment district and to the gentrifying Queen Street West area. With the influx of large-scale developers, it is likely that the new developments will obliterate any trace of the "artsy" and "bohemian" residents who once populated the area.

Christopher Hume of the Toronto Star wrote that "Liberty Village illustrates everything that's wrong with planning in Toronto," and that "civic propaganda would have us believe Liberty Village is a shining example of urban vitality". Hume described Liberty Village as "one huge parking lot after another", with very little green space.

Toronto Life described Liberty Village as a neighbourhood which has "morphed from an industrial dead zone into an enclave of concrete, glass and brick in just a few years."

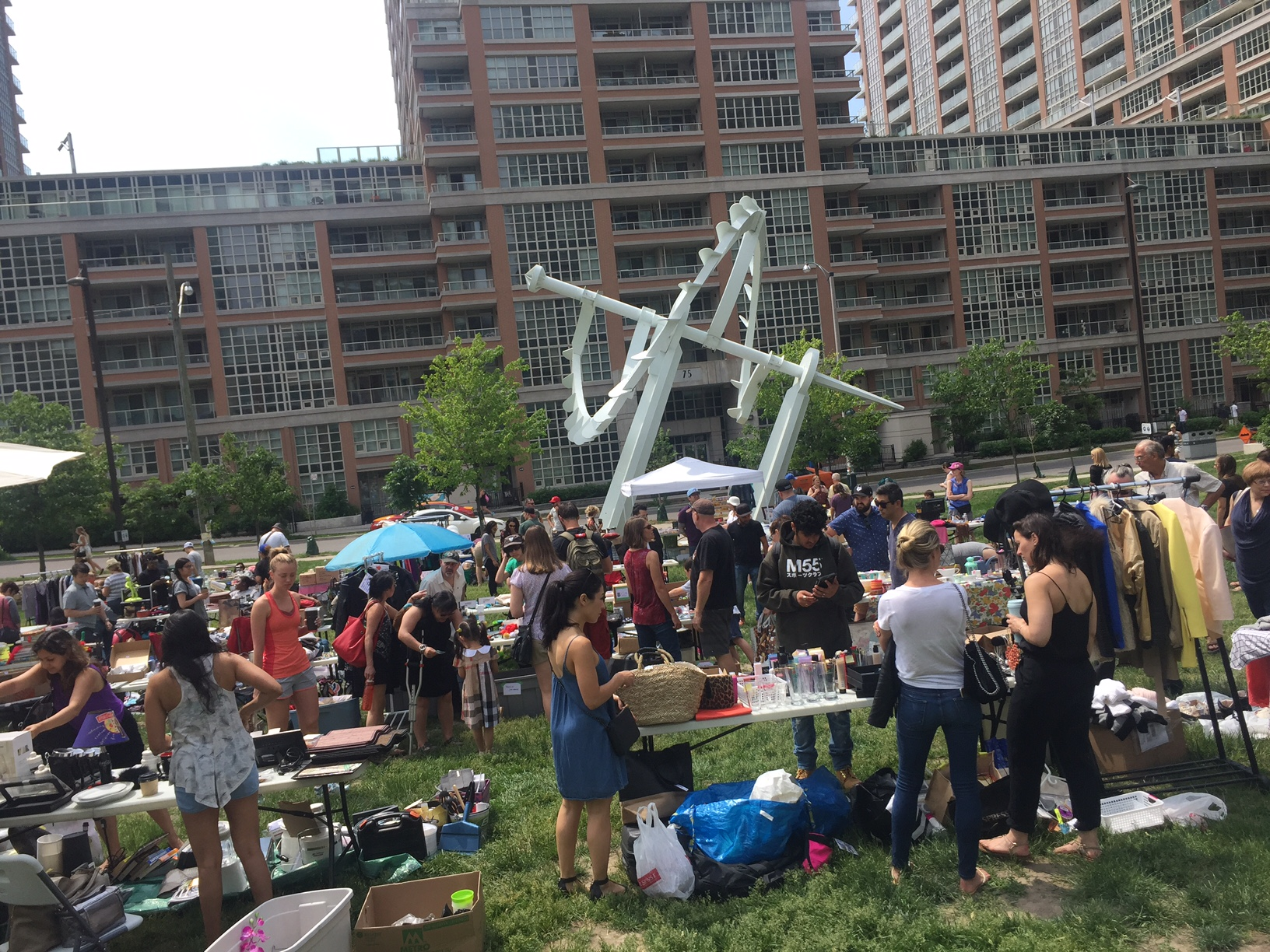
Liberate Your Locker 2017.

While preparing the Liberty Village Master Plan (2013), local residents were consulted on their general views and specific issues with the district. The responses were mixed. There were positive opinions expressed about Liberty Village's "sense of community", "youthful...[and] village atmosphere", and "sense of energy and vibrancy that comes from the concentration of creative sector businesses." Concerns were expressed about traffic congestion, the inadequacy and overcrowding of public transit, and the need to increase the diversity of the type of retail and social activities within Liberty Village. Also identified was need for improved infrastructure, such as better utilization of Lamport Stadium, and the construction of the proposed Liberty New Street along the south edge of the community.

Liberty Village's desirable location and community has made it a magnet for development and there are currently (2018) 9 additional condominiums under construction adding a new park, bridge connections to Fort York and King St. West, retail, daycare and approximately 4,000 condominium units. From 2011 census to 2016 census Liberty Village's density increased 3x.

== Transportation ==
The Toronto Transit Commission (TTC) operates the 504 King and the 29 Dufferin bus route in Liberty Village. At the southern end of Liberty Village there is access to Exhibition GO Station, served by commuter trains on GO Transit's Lakeshore West line. By 2031, Exhibition Station will also be the southern terminus of the Ontario Line, a new subway line that will connect the area with neighborhoods such as Old East York and Corktown as well as with Line 1, Line 2, and Line 5 of the Toronto subway.

In 2017, a project to speed up travel times on streetcars along the central section of King Street was implemented.

=== King-Liberty pedestrian bridge ===
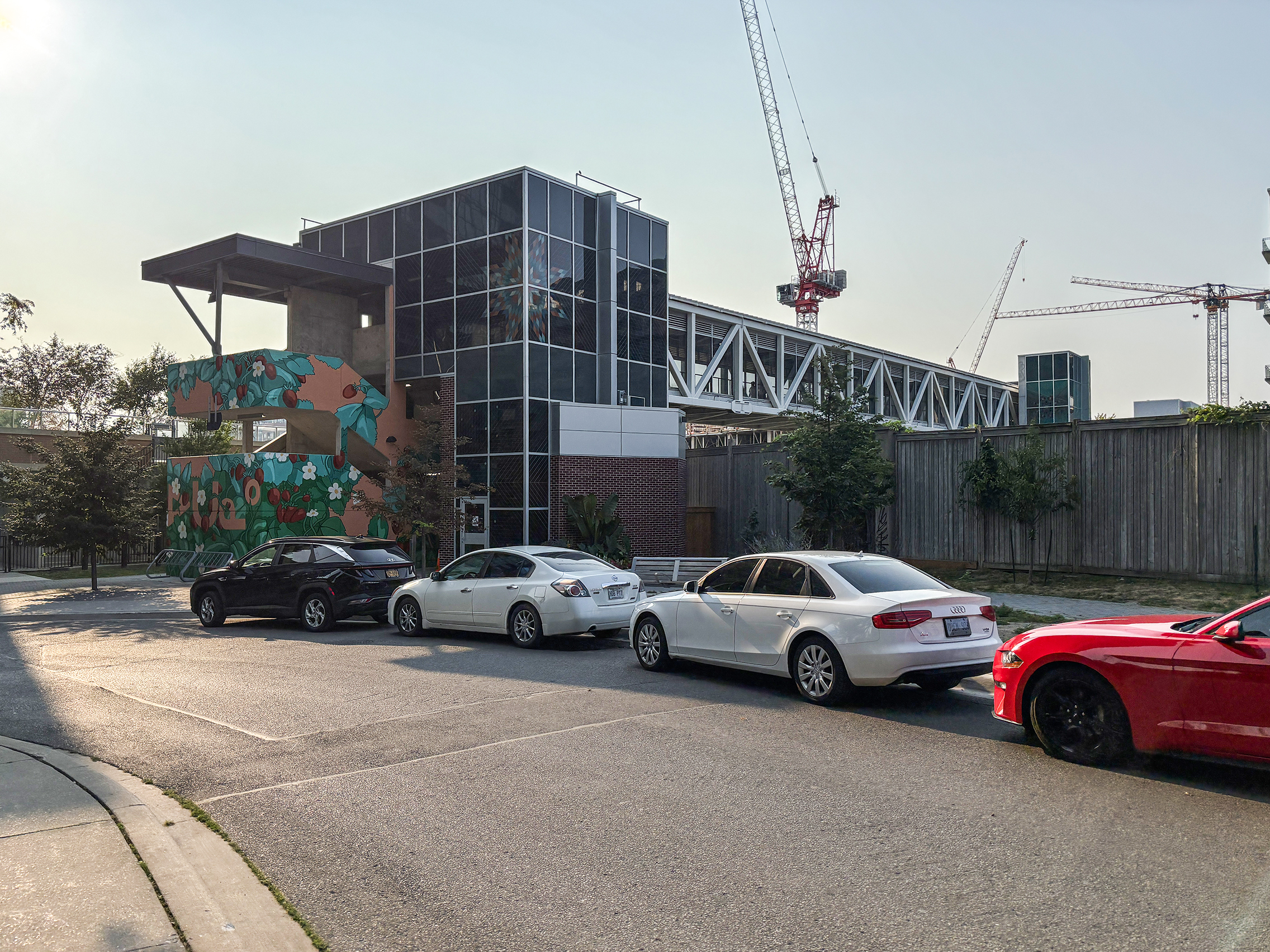
King-Liberty Bridge

A pedestrian bridge to connect Liberty Village to neighbouring Niagara was approved in 2011 and construction began in 2018. The $11.5 million bridge would provide better access to both Liberty Village and Niagara which is currently cut off by the railway corridor with access to King Street either by travelling west to Dufferin Street or east to Strachan Avenue to travel north to King Street West. Both areas were once industrial lands but are now primarily residential. The steel truss span was added in September 2019 and opened in April 2021 but it has been plagued by elevator issues and graffiti since opening.

== In popular culture ==
A documentary film on Liberty Village titled Liberty Village – Somewhere in Heaven was produced and directed by David Sloma for Rockin' Films. The film was released in 2006 (before much of the current development was completed) and features interviews with longtime Liberty Village residents Corky Laing (who provided music for the soundtrack via his band Cork), Taffi Rosen photographer/videographer, as well as other artists, business owners and workers in the area. The film was made in part with the support of the National Film Board of Canada (NFB) through their Filmmaker Assistance Program.

== See also ==
- List of neighbourhoods in Toronto
