= Stit =

Stit may refer to:

- Satit, an Egyptian goddess
- Shtit, a Bulgarian village

== See also ==
- Stitt, a surname
