= The Bridge (Canadian TV series) =

- Genre: Police drama
- Created by: Alan Di Fiore
- Starring: Aaron Douglas; Paul Popowich; Ona Grauer; Michael Murphy
- Opening theme: "I Got Mine" by The Black Keys
- Country of origin: Canada
- Original language: English
- No. of seasons: 1
- No. of episodes: 13

Production
- Executive producers: Alan Di Fiore; Robert Wertheimer; Adam J. Shully; Craig Bromell; Laszlo Barna
- Running time: 40 minutes
- Production company: E1 Entertainment

Original release
- Network: CTV
- Release: March 5 – May 21, 2010

The Bridge is a Canadian police drama commissioned by CTV starring Aaron Douglas. The name of the series is derived from the bridge which connects the wealthy Rosedale neighborhood of Toronto with one of its poorest, St. James Town.

== Overview ==
Aaron Douglas' character, Frank Leo, is loosely based upon former Toronto Police Association head Craig Bromell. After being unanimously elected head of the union, Leo sets out to end corruption in the force while working in the best interests of the rank-and-file.

== Cast ==
- Aaron Douglas as Frank Leo
- Frank Cassini as Bernie Cantor
- Inga Cadranel as Jill
- Michael Murphy as Chief Ed Wycoff
- Ona Grauer as Abby St. James
- Paul Popowich as Tommy Dunn
- Theresa Joy as Billy
- Brandon Ludwig as Bennie

== Production and broadcast ==
The initial order was for 11 episodes, produced by Entertainment One. After CTV ordered the pilot to series in November 2008, CTV later shared the pilot with CBS. The series premiered on March 5, 2010, on CTV, and July 10, 2010, on CBS. It was canceled in the United States after three episodes due to low ratings. CTV announced on June 3, 2010, that the series would return for a second season during the 2010–11 season. However, on January 13, 2011, star Aaron Douglas tweeted that the series had been officially canceled after only one season.

The Bridge was produced by Entertainment One, 990 Multi Media Entertainment Company, and Jonsworth Productions. It was announced that principal photography began on April 24, 2009. The Bridge was originally commissioned as a two-hour movie and a backdoor pilot by CTV.

== Episodes ==
No.	Title	Directed by	Written by	Original release date	Prod. code
1	"Red Door"	John Fawcett	Alan Di Fiore	March 5, 2010	101
Fed up with the corruption of his superiors, Officer Frank Leo puts his money where his mouth is and steps up to become the head of the police union.
2	"Paint it Black"	John Fawcett	Alan Di Fiore	March 5, 2010	102
Fed up with the corruption of his superiors, Officer Frank Leo puts his money where his mouth is and steps up to become the head of the police union.
3	"The Fat Lady Sings the Blues"	John Fawcett	Alan Di Fiore	March 12, 2010	103
A retired officer is murdered in an attempt to bring about long-awaited changes.
4	"The Unguarded Moment"	Stuart Margolin	Dannis Koromilas; John McFetridge	March 19, 2010	104
Frank steps up to negotiate the release of several restaurant patrons and a wounded police officer when they are taken hostage by a pair of drug addled gunmen.
5	"Vexation of Spirit"	Holly Dale	Graeme Manson	March 26, 2010	105
After two officers are investigated following a questionable shooting, Frank feels he needs to look into the incident himself when he begins to question the officers' version of events.
6	"Damned If You Do"	Paul A. Kaufman	Tracey Forbes	April 2, 2010	106
Frank steps in to defend two officers accused of negligence when they make the decision to race a gravely injured child to the hospital themselves rather than waiting for an ambulance.
7	"God Bless the Child"	Holly Dale	Peter Mohan	April 9, 2010	107
Simultaneous kidnappings occur in both rich and poor neighborhoods, and Frank must fight the brass at all levels in order to get equal resources and attention for both cases.
8	"Brown Sugar"	John Fawcett	Alan Di Fiore	April 16, 2010	108
Frank tries to solve the murder of an undercover cop whose cover must remain intact, even after her death.
9	"Painted Ladies"	Helen Shaver	John McFetridge	April 23, 2010	109
A misleading call of "Officer Down" puts Frank on the scent of an IA investigation that warrants his attention.
10	"Never Let Me Down Again"	John Fawcett	Dannis Koromilas	April 30, 2010	110
Frank becomes involved in an incident in which two officers were ambushed and one was left behind.
11	"The Blame Game"	Helen Shaver	Peter Mohan	May 7, 2010	111
After a roadside ambush kills his partner, an officer sets out to take revenge.
12	"Voices Carry"	John Fawcett	Tracey Forbes; Graeme Manson	May 14, 2010	112
A female officer is accused of spying on the police for a street gang.
13	"Chain of Fools"	John Fawcett	Alan Di Fiore	May 21, 2010	113
Frank finds himself looking for unlikely allies when a group of unknown attackers target him and his friends.

== Home media ==
On October 25, 2011, Entertainment One released The Bridge- Season 1, featuring all 13 episodes of the series, on DVD in Region 1.

== Ratings ==
=== Canadian ratings ===
Order	Episode	Airdate	Viewers (100,000s)	Rank (night)
1/2	"Red Door/Paint It Black"	March 5, 2010	12.50	1
3	"Fat Lady Sings the Blues"	March 12, 2010	TBA	TBA
4	"The Unguarded Moment"	March 19, 2010	TBA	TBA
5	"Vexation of Spirit"	March 26, 2010	TBA	TBA
6	"Damned If You Do"	April 2, 2010	8.71	TBA
7	"God Bless the Child"	April 9, 2010	TBA	TBA
8	"Brown Sugar"	April 16, 2010	TBA	TBA
9	"Painted Laidies"	April 23, 2010	TBA	TBA
10	"Never Let Me Down Again"	April 30, 2010	TBA	TBA
11	"The Blame Game"	May 7, 2010	TBA	TBA
12	"Voices Carry"	May 14, 2010	TBA	TBA
13	"Chain of Fools"	May 21, 2010	TBA	TBA

=== United States ratings ===
Order	Episode	Airdate	Rating	Share	Rating/Share (18–49)	Viewers (millions)	Rank (Timeslot)	Rank (Night)
1	"Red Door"	July 10, 2010	2.1	4	0.5/2	2.98	3	7
2	"Paint it Black"	July 10, 2010	2.1	4	0.5/2	3.51	2	6
3	"Fat Lady Sings the Blues"	July 17, 2010	1.9	4	0.3/2	2.88	4	10
