= Toronto Police Association =

Labour organization

TPA
- Toronto Police Association
- Founded: June 28, 1944 (Incorporated December 3, 1956)
- Headquarters: Toronto, Ontario, Canada
- Location: Canada
- Members: 8,000 (civilian)
- Key people: Clayton Campbell, President
- Affiliations: CPA
- Website: https://www.tpa.ca

The Toronto Police Association (TPA), founded in 1944, is a labour organization representing the approximately 8,000 civilian members of the Toronto Police Service in Toronto, Ontario, Canada. While police officers in Ontario are prohibited by law from forming a union or striking, the TPA fulfills most of the functions of a public-sector union, including collective bargaining contract negotiations with its membership's employer, the Toronto Police Service.

== History ==
In 1918, Toronto officers formed the Toronto Police Union, chartered by the Trades and Labor Congress of Canada. At the time, police officers were not barred from joining a union, but the Police Commission refused to recognize its existence and fired officers who held executive positions in the union. On December 18 1918, two-thirds of Toronto officers went on a strike that lasted four days.

Craig Bromell served as president of the TPA from 1997 to 2003. In 1995, in response to an inquiry into an incident where Dwight Drummond and a friend were stopped and handcuffed, Bromell had led an eight-hour wildcat strike of police officers. As president, Bromell continued to clash with TPS officials such as chiefs Julian Fantino and David Boothby, deputy chief Robert Kerr, and the Toronto Police Services Board.

In 2000, the TPA began a telemarketing fundraising campaign called Operation True Blue. Money raised was planned to be used for investigations of police-unfriendly politicians. Similar to Police Benevolent Associations in the US, it gifted windshield stickers to donors. Critics described the campaign as a protection racket and an intimidation campaign. After the chief of police threatened to charge six police officers on the TPA executive board, the campaign was dropped.

In 2005, the TPA engaged in a protracted contract negotiation with the Toronto Police Services Board. Being unable to strike, the TPA initiated a work to rule campaign in the fall. A deal was finally reached in November.

Rick McIntosh served as president for a period of six months between 2003 and 2004 before stepping down amid a probe into liquor license corruption. McIntosh was charged with soliciting and accepting bribes from nightclub owners in the Toronto Entertainment District, but the charges against him were later dropped.

Mike McCormack was president of the TPA from 2009 to his retirement in 2020. In June 2014 the TPA sold its headquarters building for $7.4 million, who sold the same building for $11.5 million the next year. TPA members alleged the sale was mishandled and called for a forensic audit: the TPA responded by describing these allegations as "misinformation."

John Reid succeeded Mike McCormack as president in 2020. In August 2021, the TPA publicly opposed COVID-19 vaccination mandates for its members. This caused a rift between the TPA and the Chief of the Toronto Police Service James Ramer. Notably, the Premier of Ontario Doug Ford's daughter, Krista Haynes, was a vocal critic of vaccine policies. She is married to a police officer who was placed on administrative leave in November 2021 and had his badge revoked in December 2021 for non-compliance. In June 2022, the Toronto Police Service ended the vaccine mandate and agreed to reinstate 101 employees on unpaid leave.

== See also ==
- Law enforcement in Canada
- Police union
