= Myron Demkiw =

Canadian police officer

Myron Demkiw MOM
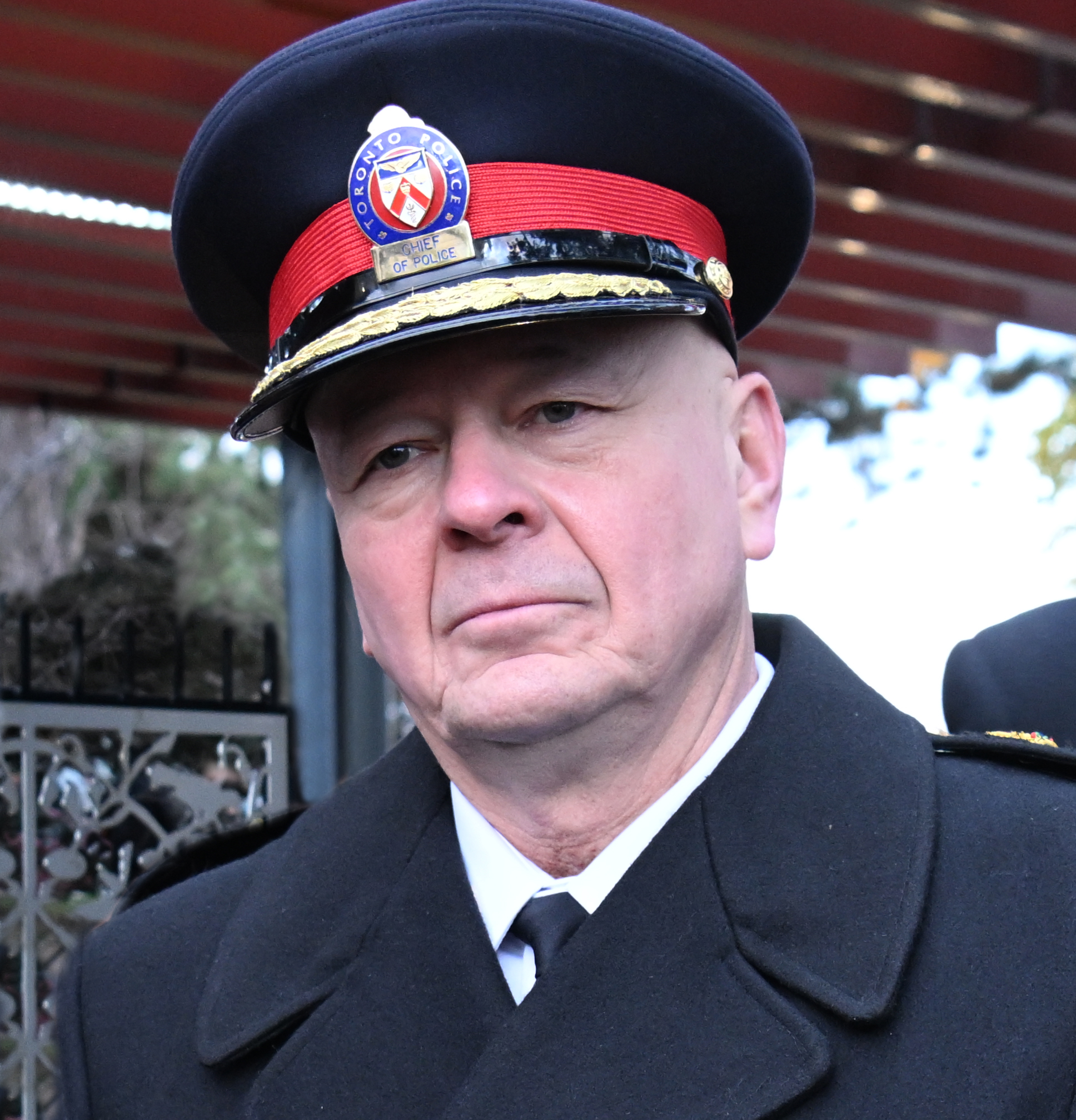
- Demkiw in 2024

Chief of the Toronto Police Service
- Incumbent
- Assumed office December 19, 2022
- Preceded by: James Ramer (interim)

Deputy Chief of the Toronto Police Service for Specialized Operations Command
- In office August 2020 – December 2022

Personal details
- Born: 1965 or 1966 (age 59–60) Toronto, Canada
- Education: University of Toronto (BA, 1989; GPLLM, 2020)
- Profession: Police officer
- Police career
- Department: Toronto Police Service
- Service years: 1990–present
- Rank: Chief of Police

Myron Demkiw MOM is a Canadian police officer who has been the chief of police with the Toronto Police Service (TPS) since December 19, 2022.

== Early life and education ==
Demkiw was born in Toronto, Ontario, to Ukrainian parents. He attended St. Michael’s College School, graduating in 1985, before completing a bachelor’s degree in political science and criminology at the University of Toronto in 1989. In 2019, he returned to the University of Toronto, completing the Global Professional Master of Laws (GPLLM) program in 2020. He is also a graduate of the Police Leadership Program with Rotman School of Management.

== Career ==
Demkiw joined the Metro Toronto Police in 1990, the year after he completed his bachelor's degree.

Five years into his career in 1995, Demkiw was nearly killed while working in plain clothes by a man who attempted to shoot him with a handgun.

In 2000, he participated in a raid of a lesbian bathhouse, resulting in six Liquor Licence Act charges, which were later dismissed when a court ruled the initial raid unreasonable two years later. Councillor Kyle Rae accused the TPS of trying to ogle naked women, and was sued by Demkiw and six fellow officers for defamation. Rae was ordered to pay the officers $170,000. As part of a human rights settlement from that raid in 2004, the Toronto Police Service enhanced efforts to recruit gay officers, adopt a gender-sensitive policy and paid $350,000 to the complainants.

Demkiw became an inspector in 2011, before being promoted to superintendent five years later and staff superintendent in 2018. He held a number of management roles including duty senior officer, unit commander of Intelligence Services, leading Detective Operations, heading Corporate Risk Management, and as second in command of 32 Division. In the wake of the Bruce McArthur serial homicides case, he oversaw the creation of the Missing Persons Unit.

In 2020, he became acting deputy chief of specialized operations command, where he would oversee Public Safety Operations and Detective Operations.

=== Chief of Police ===
On September 15, 2022, the Toronto Police Services Board (TPSB) announced that Demkiw would be the city's next chief of police. He started as chief of police on December 19, 2022, taking over from James Ramer, who served as interim chief for two years following the resignation of Mark Saunders.
