= Mark Saunders (police officer) =

Canadian police chief (born 1962)

Mark Saunders OOM
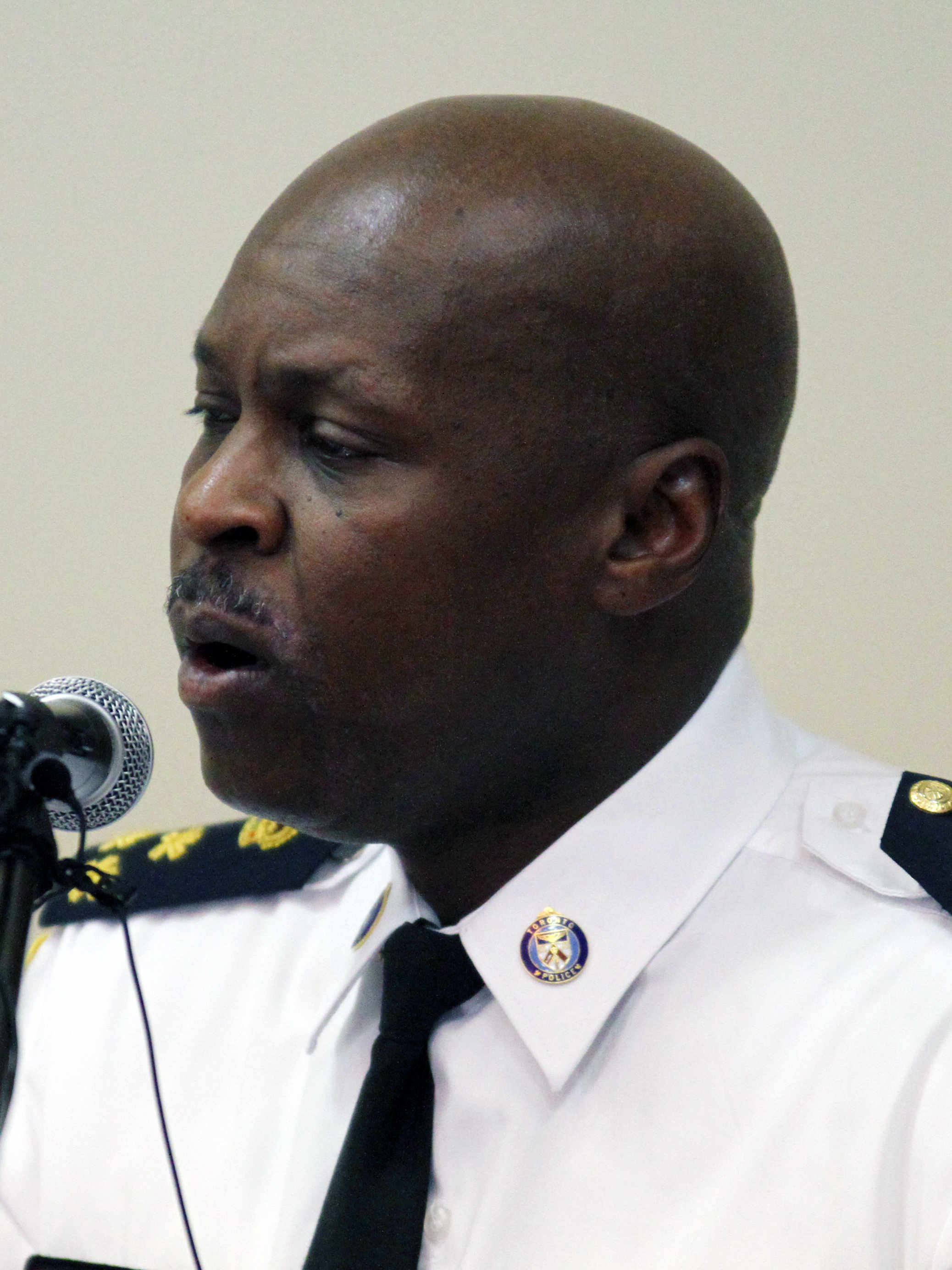
- Saunders in 2015

Chief of the Toronto Police Service
- In office April 26, 2015 – July 31, 2020
- Preceded by: Bill Blair
- Succeeded by: James Ramer (interim)

Personal details
- Born: 1962 (age 63–64) London, England
- Citizenship: Canada; United Kingdom
- Party: Progressive Conservative
- Spouse: Stacey Saunders
- Education: University of Guelph-Humber
- Occupation: Police officer

Mark Saunders OOM (born 1962) is a Canadian politician and retired police officer who served as chief of police with the Toronto Police Service (TPS) from 2015 to 2020.

Saunders was the Progressive Conservative (PC) candidate in Don Valley West in the 2022 Ontario election where he finished second behind Liberal candidate Stephanie Bowman. Saunders was a candidate for mayor of Toronto in the 2023 by-election, where he came in third, to winner Olivia Chow and runner-up Ana Bailão. Saunders' candidacy was described as a "law and order" campaign.

== Early life and education ==
In 1962, Saunders was born in England to Jamaican parents. His family moved from England to Quebec in 1967, and in 1969, they settled in Milton, Ontario. He was student council president while attending Milton District High School, and also attended W. I. Dick Middle School, J.M. Denyes School, and Martin Street Middle School. He earned an honours bachelor of applied science in justice studies from the University of Guelph-Humber shortly after his appointment as Toronto Chief of Police.

== Toronto Police Service ==
Saunders began his policing career after graduating from high school. Before being appointed chief in 2015, he held the position of deputy chief in charge of specialized operations command. He has had assignments with professional standards, urban street gang unit, intelligence division, drug squad, community safety command, and emergency task force, and served as the unit commander of the homicide squad.

=== Chief of police ===
Saunders was selected by the Toronto Police Services Board (TPSB) on April 17, 2015, to succeed Bill Blair as the chief of police. Saunders is the first Black Canadian to lead the Toronto police and the second Black Canadian to lead a police force in Canada (having been preceded by Devon Clunis of the Winnipeg Police Service in 2012). He was selected over Peter Sloly, another black deputy chief who was at that time considered more open to progressive reforms.

In August 2019, the Toronto Police Services Board extended Saunders' five year contract by one year, until April 2021. However, on June 8, 2020, Saunders announced his retirement effective July 31, 2020.

2017 Barry and Honey Sherman homocides

Saunders was the police chief when Barry and Honey Sherman were targeted in their homes and murdered. The police assumed that Barry had done a murder-suicide for the first 6-8 weeks, even though there were markings on their wrists from being tied up. They also waited eight months to collect fingerprints from potential witnesses, which meant that trace evidence could have been degraded or lost. They also delayed watching neighbourhood security cameras for six weeks.

Members of the Sherman family hired Brian Greenspan as well as a team of private investigators, to try to solve the case. Greenspan argued that the bodies were staged to fool the police. Twenty-five palm prints and fingerprints were reportedly overlooked by Toronto Police, headed by Saunders. As of November 2026, there is still no conviction for this crime.

==== 2010–2017 Toronto serial homicides ====
Between 2010 and 2017, a series of men disappeared in Toronto, Ontario, Canada. In the early part of the decade, Toronto police had created Project Houston, a divisional task force which linked the disappearance of three men of South Asian or Middle Eastern origin to Church and Wellesley, Toronto's gay village. The investigation was unable to determine if the disappearances were related nor if a crime had been committed. In mid-2017, amid public speculation of a serial killer in Church and Wellesley, evidence was gained from another missing-persons investigation which led TPS to create a second divisional task force, Project Prism. In December 2017, Saunders held a press conference, at which he stated, “We follow the evidence, and the evidence tells us that's not the case right now. The evidence today tells us there's not a serial killer.” In January 2018, Project Prism investigators obtained evidence connecting two disappearances to Bruce McArthur, a 66-year-old self-employed landscaper, whom they arrested on January 18, 2018. In February 2018, Saunders blamed the community for not doing enough to help.

==== Vote of no confidence ====
In February 2018, the Toronto Police Association (TPA), the labour organization which represents 5,400 police officers and other TPS employees held a non-binding vote of non-confidence among its membership on Saunders' leadership as chief, with 48.1 per cent of its membership participating. A modernization initiative spearheaded by Saunders, resulted in a reduction of front-line officers, which the TPA says risked officer safety and harmed morale. The association cited "ineffective leadership, lack of communication skills and failure to take responsibility" as reasons for holding the vote. 86 per cent of respondents indicated that they did not have confidence in Saunders' leadership.

Following the vote, TPA president Mike McCormack said that the vote was not meant to result in Saunders' dismissal as chief, but should be seen as a "call to action". At a police board meeting, Saunders stated "I think that we’re all moving in the right direction, are there some communication breakdowns and misunderstandings that need to be identified, absolutely and that’s what we’re going to do." The TPSB chair indicated that the board continued to support Saunders, as did Mayor John Tory.

==== Toronto van attack ====
The Toronto van attack was a vehicle-ramming attack that occurred on April 23, 2018, when a rented van was driven along Yonge Street through the North York City Centre business district in Toronto, Ontario. The driver targeted pedestrians, killing 10 and injuring 16, some critically. The incident is the deadliest vehicle-ramming attack in Canadian history.

==== Danforth shooting ====
The 2018 Toronto shooting, known locally as the Danforth shooting, was a mass shooting that occurred on Danforth Avenue in the Greektown neighbourhood of Toronto, Ontario, on the night of July 22 which killed two people and wounded thirteen. The shooter died by suicide after a shootout with TPS officers.

==== Resignation ====
Saunders announced his resignation on June 8, 2020, after serving 37 years with TPS. July 31, 2020 was his final day as chief – 8 months prior to the expiry of Saunders' contract. Saunders said he made the decision to leave sooner in order to "put family first".

== Post-policing career ==
In December 2020, Saunders joined the COVID-19 vaccine task force for Ontario during the COVID-19 pandemic in Ontario. He was named the province's special advisor for the Ontario Place redevelopment project. His term lasted from February 2021 to June 2022 and included $170,000 in compensation. In October 2023, a Freedom of Information and Protection of Privacy Act request made by NDP MPP Chris Glover, was unable to locate any records of advice, reports, or other work originating from Saunders. As of August 2024, Saunders serves as a Director of Community Outreach for a Toronto-based real estate development firm, Spotlight Developments Inc.

=== 2022 provincial election ===
Saunders unsuccessfully contested the 2022 Ontario general election as the Progressive Conservative candidate for the riding of Don Valley West, previously held by former premier Kathleen Wynne since 2003, who was not seeking re-election. He was defeated by the Liberal candidate, accountant Stephanie Bowman.

=== 2023 mayoral by-election ===
On March 20, 2023, Saunders announced that he would contest the 2023 Toronto mayoral by-election. In a Toronto Star column, Saunders identified community safety as a focus of his campaign, writing that he would focus on the root causes of crime. He identified 24-hour access to mental health care as an area he would focus on. Saunders was not elected; he was in distant third at 8% of the vote, after Olivia Chow (37%) and Ana Bailao (32%).

== Personal life ==
Saunders has four children with his wife Stacey; they live in North York.

In October 2017, Saunders had a kidney transplant surgery with his wife as the donor. Saunders was born with only one kidney and underwent nightly kidney dialysis at home for 15 months prior to the surgery. He stated that the family went public about the transplant in order to raise awareness of the organ donation program.

Mark's sister Yvonne Saunders is a noted former track and field athlete who competed for Canada at the 1976 Summer Olympics.

== Honours ==
Ribbon Bars

Ribbons	Order of Merit of the Police Forces; Officer	Queen Elizabeth II Diamond Jubilee Medal; Canadian version of the medal	Police Exemplary Service Medal; With One Bar

== Electoral record ==
2023 Toronto mayoral by-election
Candidate	Votes	%
Olivia Chow	268,676	37.17
Ana Bailão	234,647	32.46
Mark Saunders	62,017	8.58
Anthony Furey	35,839	4.96
Josh Matlow	35,516	4.91
Mitzie Hunter	21,170	2.93
Chloe Brown	18,763	2.60
95 other candidates	46,249	6.39

2022 Ontario general election: Don Valley West
Party	Candidate	Votes	%	±%
Liberal	Stephanie Bowman	16,177	44.01	+5.12
Progressive Conservative	Mark Saunders	14,208	38.65	+0.16
New Democratic	Irwin Elman	3,392	9.23	-9.60
Green	Sheena Sharp	2,025	5.51	+2.74
New Blue	Laurel Hobbs	421	1.15	N/A
Libertarian	John Kittredge	225	0.45	+0.45
Ontario Party	Kylie Mc Allister	167	0.45	N/A
Independent	John Kladitis	85	0.23	N/A
Consensus Ontario	Paul Reddick	60	0.16	N/A
Total valid votes		36,760	99.41	
Total rejected, unmarked and declined ballots		218	0.59	
Turnout			43.10	-18.33
Eligible voters		75,205		
Liberal hold		Swing		+2.48
Source: Elections Ontario
