= Toronto circus riot =

1855 riot in British Canada

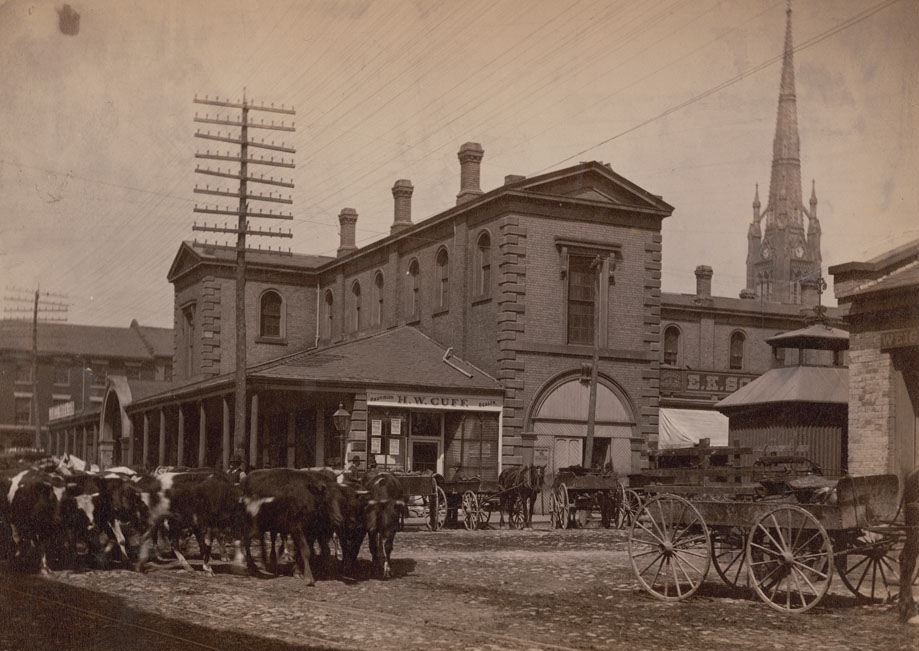
- St. Lawrence Market in the late 19th century
- Date: 13 July 1855
- Location: Fair Green, east of St. Lawrence Market; 43°39′2″N 79°21′58″W
- Methods: Street fighting; Arson

Parties
Clowns of the S.B. Howes' Star Troupe Menagerie & Circus	Orange Order; Hook & Ladder firefighters; Toronto Police Service

The Toronto circus riot occurred on 13 July 1855, a few blocks east of the St. Lawrence Market in Toronto, in the British Province of Canada. It began as a brothel fight between American circus clowns traveling with the S. B. Howes' Star Troupe Menagerie & Circus and local firefighters associated with the Hook & Ladder company, and resulted in the firefighters destroying the circus. The Toronto Police Service was present at the riot, but, showing favoritism to members of the Orange Order, refused to identify any of the rioters. The apparent corruption and incompetence of the police service led to public scandal and widespread police reform within the city.

== Background ==
During the 1850s, the Irish Protestant-founded Orange Order in Toronto held immense political power. All policemen within the city were members of the Orange Order, as were all of the fire brigades. On 12 July, Orangemen within Toronto celebrated the Twelfth, an important holiday for the group. The Toronto Police Service at the time showed favoritism to members of the Orange Order and to Protestants in general, frequently refusing to identify or charge Orangemen that attacked Catholics or participated in fights.

In the 1850s, there was no central public fire service in Toronto. Instead, private firefighting companies competed for jobs when fires broke out. Two weeks prior to the circus riot, the Hook & Ladder fire brigade company engaged in a street brawl against another fire brigade when they both arrived at the same fire. When police arrived, the firefighting companies joined forces and fought the police.

On the night of the Twelfth in 1855, a group of American circus clowns traveling with the S. B. Howes' Star Troupe Menagerie & Circus visited a brothel on King Street that was frequented by the Hook & Ladder firemen. A drunken fireman named Fraser knocked off the hat of a clown named Meyers and refused to pick it up. A fight broke out between the two groups, and the clowns soundly defeated the firefighters. Two firefighters were seriously injured, and the rest fled the establishment for the night. By fighting with the firefighters on an important Orange Order holiday, the clowns had inadvertently angered the entire Orange Order in Toronto.

== Riot ==
On 13 July 1855, a large crowd gathered around the S. B. Howes' Star Troupe Menagerie & Circus, which was pitched on Fair Green a few blocks east of the St. Lawrence Market. Samuel Sherwood, the High Constable of the Toronto Police Service, was made aware of the gathering, but chose to wait before sending police. When the police arrived, the riot had already begun. Rioters began to overturn and burn circus wagons, and the rioters could not be calmed even after the mayor and Sherwood both arrived. As a wagon was burning, somebody rang a fire bell, summoning the Hook & Ladder firemen. They ignored the fire, instead joining the riot. The firefighters tore down the circus tent before setting it on fire. Sherwood attempted to arrest a rioter but was forced to release him after the mob turned on him. The mayor saved one clown from being murdered when he grabbed an axe from the hands of a firefighter. At this point, the mayor called in the militia and the riot ended. Circus performers then gathered their belongings and fled.

== Aftermath ==
Police that were present at the riot claimed that they could not identify any of the rioting Orangemen. Of 17 people charged for rioting, only one was convicted. This event, combined with a history of similar coverups carried out by the police service, led to widespread protest from the press and the public. A public inquiry was launched that revealed deep systemic corruption within the police service. It was revealed that police at the time were appointed by city councilors with no required training or experience, and that this system subjected police to political pressure. In 1858, a provincially approved board redesigned the police department, and the entire previous department was fired in February 1859. It was at this point that the modern system of policing in Toronto was created.
