= Mike McCormack (police officer) =

Canadian police officer

- Born: Scarborough, Ontario, Canada
- Occupation(s): police officer TPA president - retired August 2020
- Relatives: William J. McCormack; William McCormack Jr. Kathy McCormack; Jamie McCormack

Michael McCormack is a retired Toronto Police officer, son of a former Toronto Police Chief, and the president of the Toronto Police Association from 2009 to 2020.

== Personal life ==
McCormack is the son of former Toronto Police Chief William J. McCormack who headed the Metropolitan Toronto Police Service from 1989 to 1995. He comes from a family of police officers; his paternal grandfather was a police officer in Ireland before being promoted Sergeant Major in charge of the Beau Bassin Police Station on the island of, what was then the British Colony of, Mauritius in the Indian Ocean off Madagascar; his maternal grandfather was connected with the OPP; and three of his four siblings have a connection to policing in Ontario.

== Police career ==
McCormack began his 23-year policing career working at 52 Division, in downtown Toronto's entertainment district, where his older brother, William Jr., was assigned from 1996 until his suspension in April 2004, when criminal charges for corruption were laid in relation to "shaking down club owners" in 52 Division and William Jr. resigned in March 2009 although the criminal charges for soliciting and accepting bribes were stayed for excessive delay by Crown prosecutors and the lead police investigator. Mike subsequently moved to 51 Division, policing Toronto's Regent Park district, which he "loved", later indicating "Regent Park was my niche".

In 2002, 51 Division's McCormack, Detective Constable Jack Caccavale, and Detective Scott Matthews, of the Toronto Police Drug Squad, co-founded the annual "Fite Nite" event which McCormack co-emcees. The event was started to boost morale following the suspension of several 51 Division officers, including former TPA president Craig Bromell, for allegedly beating up homeless man Thomas Kerr. The private charity event, which is attended by some 2,000 law enforcement personnel including police, corrections officers, and Crown attorneys, consists of both male and female members, from area police departments, paramedics, firefighters, and 911, engaging in boxing matches to determine who will win bragging rights for the following year. Proceeds of the annual event support Police Enabling Action for Community Education (THE P.E.A.C.E. FUND), chaired by Matthews and supervised by Dixon Hall, which uses the money to fund partial scholarships for local students to attend university. Officially, the event is condemned by TPS as its "boozy underpinnings and sexist overtones" do not fit with the image the service is trying to project. Several hours after the March 2009 Fite Nite event three officers allegedly ganged up on a 33 Division officer, who had been officer of the month from January of that year, beating him to the extent that he was hospitalized, suffering from serious head injuries and requiring a CT scan to check for possible brain injuries; despite an internal investigation, no criminal charges were laid and no disciplinary action was reported.

In 2004, McCormack was charged with corruption and discreditable conduct under the Ontario Police Services Act for allegedly being involved with a reputed organized crime affiliated, drug-addicted, used-car salesman; however those charges were later dropped. Then in 2008 another discreditable conduct charge against McCormack was also dismissed, that charge stemming from McCormack having, for his own purposes, recorded Toronto Star reporter John Duncanson while he was being held in a cell after an arrest for public drunkenness. It was not until September 2009, the same day that David Miller announced that he would not be running for a third term as Mayor of Toronto, that McCormack was convicted of insubordination under the police act for improperly, and for purposes not related to law enforcement, accessing Duncanson's records in the police database. Duncanson had previously penned numerous stories involving Toronto Police for the Star and was the award-winning investigative reporter who, in 2005, uncovered illicit activities by six members of 51 Division's drug squad. The fine for McCormack's insubordination conviction was 40 hours pay; however, since McCormack had already been elected to the Toronto Police Association, the pseudo-union for Toronto Police officers and civilian employees, by the time he was sentenced, he cannot be compelled to pay the fine because, although he's technically still a Toronto Police officer, he's currently on secondment to the TPA and is paid by them; so the TPS is unable to deduct the fine from his wages and, except through payroll deductions, has no legal power to compel payment; but the money would eventually be collected if McCormack ever returned to active duty with the Service.

McCormack retired on August 1 2020, and shortly after purchased an oceanfront home in Florida and took a position as chief risk officer at ECN Capital.
