= Brandon Ludwig =

Canadian actor (born 1990)

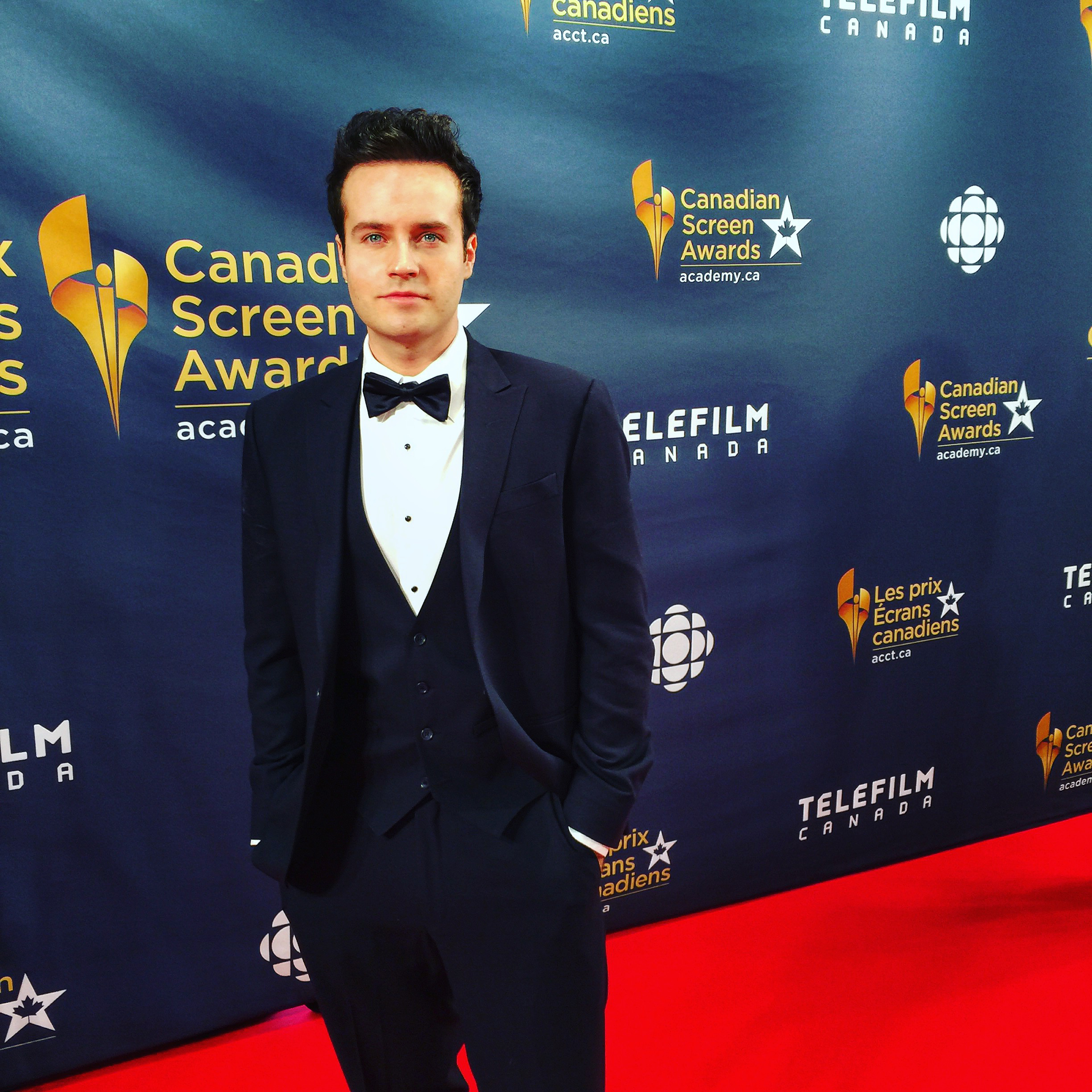
- Brandon Ludwig at the Academy Canadian Screen Awards red carpet March 13, 2016
- Born: September 30, 1990 (age 35); Kitchener, Ontario
- Other names: DON BR4N
- Education: Waterloo University
- Occupation: Actor
- Years active: 2007–present
- Known for: Gamer's Paradise
- Height: 1.8 m (5 ft 11 in)

Brandon Ludwig (born September 30, 1990) is a Canadian actor. He achieved international recognition for portraying a promiscuous and dim-witted but good-natured roommate on the television show Gamer's Paradise. His persona on the show was considered a "ladies' man," with a marked childish side.

== Early life ==
Ludwig was born and raised in Kitchener, Ontario. He graduated from the University of Waterloo. His early acting education came from the Second City School in Toronto where he moved after university to pursue his acting career.

== Career ==
Ludwig had his first role in a Canadian film in 2007 with his brother Sheldon Ludwig. He went on to book over 100 different jobs in his career before he was able to get into television. Sheldon went on to create a film/TV production company, Don Shal Productions. Brandon on the other hand, acted in various roles in film and television such as: A Fighting Man, My Babysitter's a Vampire, Man Seeking Woman. Ludwig's most notable achievement came when he contributed to Joseph Gordon-Levitt's HitRecord on TV television show where they won an Emmy Award for Outstanding Creative Achievement in Interactive Media – Social TV Experience; Joseph shared the Emmy with his contributors. Brandon and Sheldon partner together in the industry and are known as the Ludwig Bros. Ludwig is directing Canadian Star which is a documentary about bringing to light the subject of name recognition in Canada; the documentary will be released in 2016. Ludwig's next project will be The Dunner (movie working title) with Sanctuary sci-fi star Robin Dunne with his brother and Dave Roberts.

Since 2020, Ludwig has been a regular on the podcast Beam Me Up Scotty, created and hosted by his friend Kenny Scott Guffey.

== Filmography ==
Year	Title	Role
2008	Rent-a-Goalie	Yellow Cats Goalie
2010	The Bridge	Bennie
2010	My Babysitter's a Vampire	Electro-Vampire
2014	HitRecord on TV	Game Announcer
2014	A Fighting Man	Bobby
2015	Man Seeking Woman	Xander
2016	Lost & Found Music Studios	A&R Rep
2016	11.22.63	Rookie
2020	Gamer's paradise	Big

2022 A Night of the Undead
