= Toronto Central Prison Chapel =

Building in Toronto, Canada

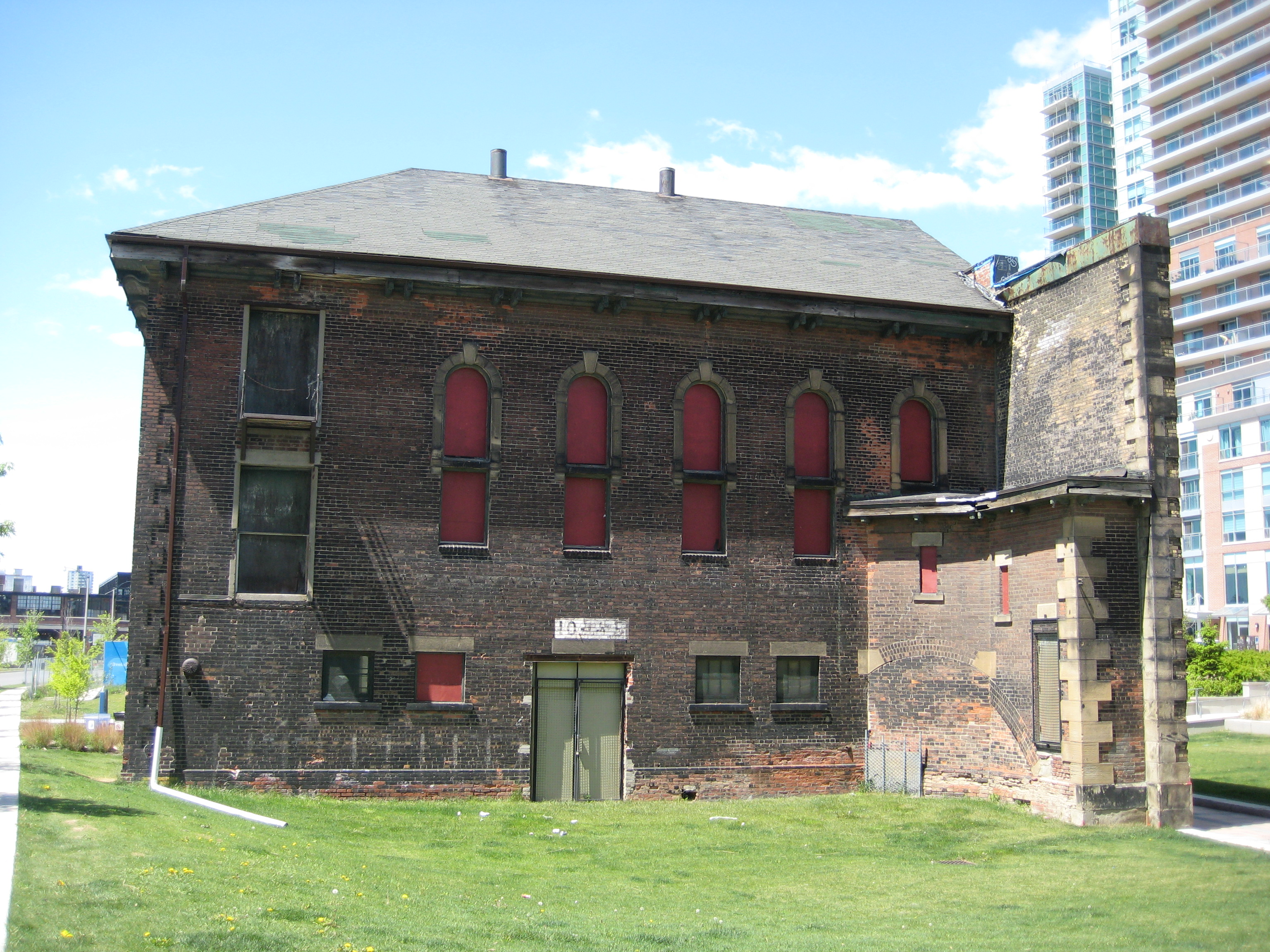
- Interactive map of Toronto Central Prison Chapel
- Location: East Liberty Street, Toronto; 43°38′19.5″N 79°24′52″W
- Status: Closed
- Security class: Maximum Security Prison Chapel
- Opened: 1877
- Closed: 1915

The Toronto Central Prison Chapel is an 1877 former Roman Catholic prison chapel, located in Toronto, Ontario, Canada. The building is the last remaining building of the Toronto Central Prison complex which was located south of King Street and west of Strachan Avenue in Toronto. The other remaining portion of the prison is a wall of the prison's paint shop on the east side of the Liberty Storage Warehouse. The chapel was built by prisoners of the prison. The chapel was added to the city's list of heritage properties in 1985 and is protected from demolition, under the City of Toronto government by-law.

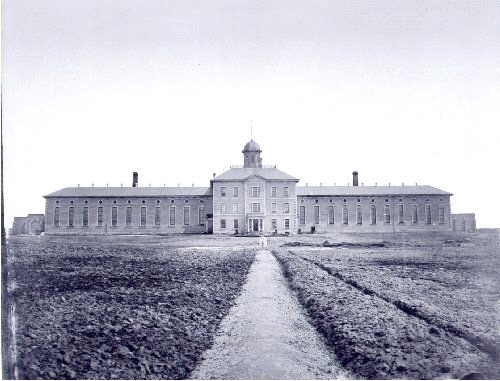
Toronto Central Prison, date unknown

As of 2015, the building is vacant. Its most recent use was as part of the Inglis factory complex that was situated in the area. In 2011, the prison chapel was slated to become the next location of the Miller Tavern restaurant chain, but the building remains vacant. As part of the Liberty Village development, the grounds around the building were converted to parkland, known as the Liberty Village Park.

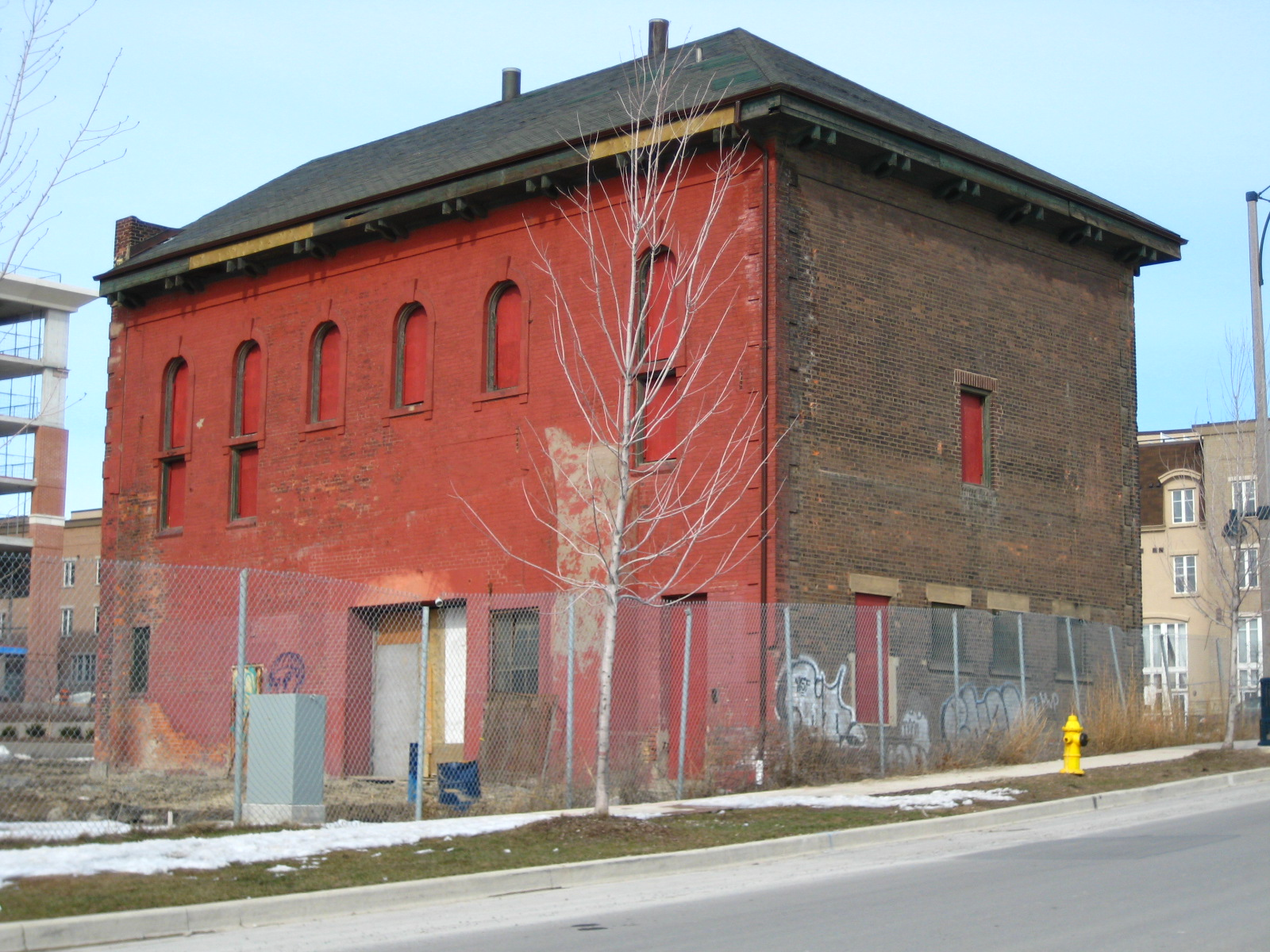
Remains of the Toronto Central Prison Chapel - East view

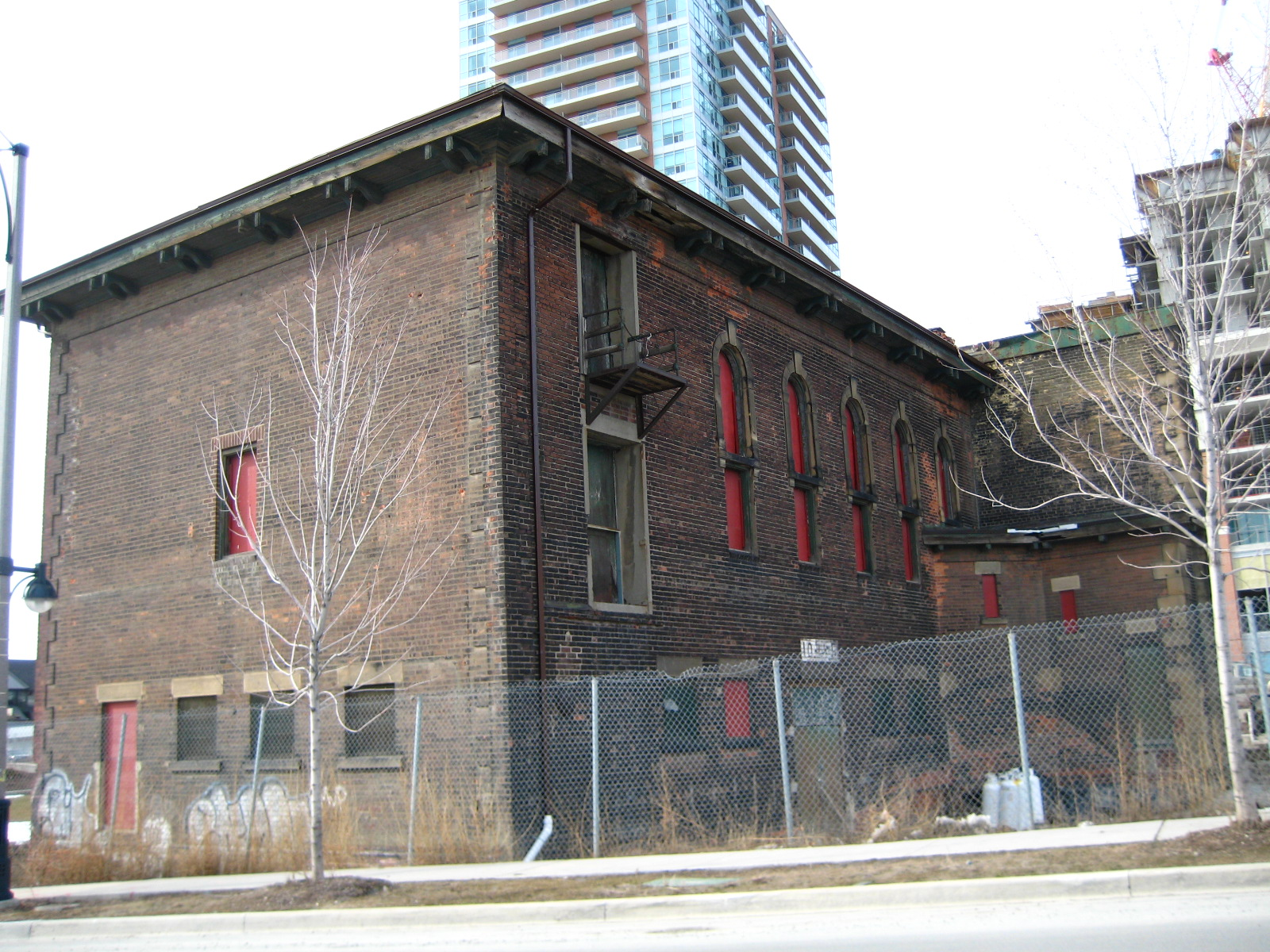
Remains of the Toronto Central Prison Chapel - West view

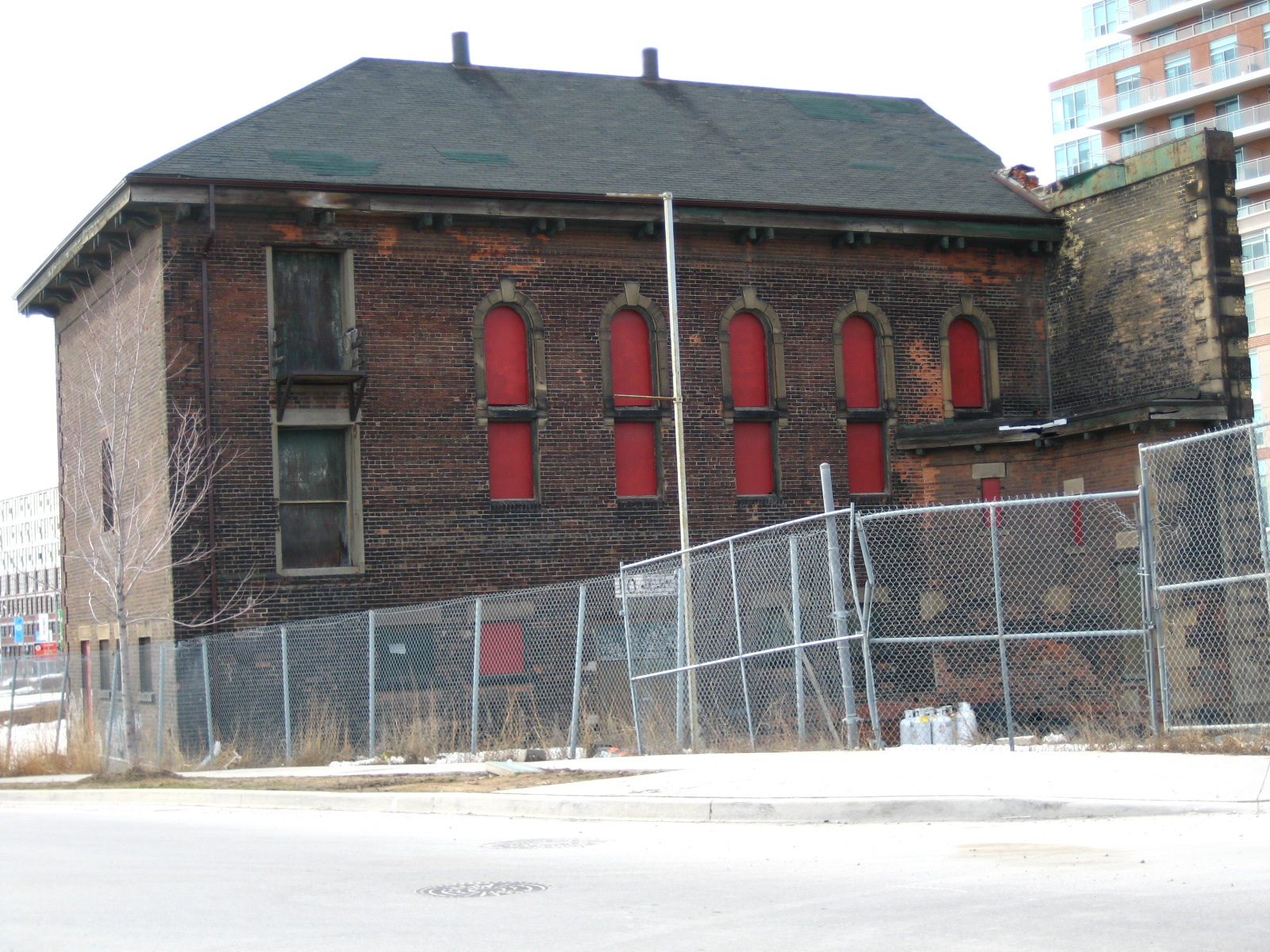
Remains of the Toronto Central Prison Chapel - West view 2

== See also ==
- Toronto Central Prison
