= George L. Allen =

High Constable of the Toronto Police Department

George Littleton Allen

High Constable of the Toronto Police Department
- In office 1847–1852
- Preceded by: George Kingsmill
- Succeeded by: Samuel Sherwood

Personal details
- Born: 1811 Sligo, Ireland
- Died: 1882 (aged 70–71) Toronto, Ontario, Canada

George Littleton Allen (1811-1882) was High Constable of Toronto from 1847 to 1852 and Governor of the Toronto Jail from 1852 to 1872.

Allen was born to a Protestant family in Sligo, Ireland, United Kingdom, and emigrated to New York at the age of 15 before moving to Toronto. He was appointed High Constable or Chief Constable of the Toronto Police Department by the city in 1847 and served in that position for five years until 1852 when he was appointed Governor of the Toronto Jail and was the first governor of the Don Jail when it opened in 1864, taking up residence in the jail's administrative wing.
