= Thomas Baines (Ontario) =

Thomas Baines (1799–1867) was born in Caynham, England, as the son of the Rev. James Johnson Baines, and came to Canada c.1821.

Baines worked as a land and immigrant agent with Peter Robinson, most notably settling the Irish immigrants in the Bathurst district and Peterborough, Ontario. He was later commissioned as an officer in the 1st Carleton Regiment and was made Deputy Auditor General. Due to his experience of land assessment and transaction in Ontario, he was appointed as Secretary of the Clergy Corporation in 1833 and executed the sale of the controversial Clergy Reserves. By 1838, the corporation was essentially dissolved and Thomas was appointed Crown land Agent for the Home District. He continued in this role until 1855 when he tendered his resignation to the Lieutenant Governor following allegations of default. He was shown to be in arrears (the greatest default in pre-Confederation Ontario) and so was forced to cede all his property to the government. From 1844 to 1863 he owned a Brewery at Queen and Niagara Streets called the West Toronto Brewery while he also owned a mill at Innisville. The Brewery was sold to Patrick Cosgrave in 1863 and continued making beer for another eighty years. He was also involved in the incorporation of a number of companies in the Toronto area including the Western Assurance Company in 1851, as well as the Victoria Mining Company and the Toronto and Georgian Bay Canal Company in 1856. Thomas Baines died in 1867 at Toronto.

He married twice, first to Georgina Catherine Lodge Wilcocks by who he had one surviving child; his second marriage was to Catherine, daughter of William Bancks, the founder of Bewdley, Ontario, by whom there were many other children, including Dr. Allen Mackenzie Baines the first Physician-in-Chief of the Hospital for Sick Children.
