= William Stratton Prince =

Canadian police chief

Captain William Stratton Prince

Chief Constable of the Toronto Police Department
- In office 1859–1873
- Preceded by: Samuel Sherwood
- Succeeded by: Francis Collier Draper

Personal details
- Born: 18 April 1824 Cheltenham, Gloucestershire, England
- Died: 15 November 1881 Wellington, Ontario, Canada
- Relations: John Prince, father

Captain William Stratton Prince (18 April 1824 – 15 November 1881) was a British Army officer, Chief Constable of Toronto (1859–1873) and the first warden of the Toronto Central Prison (1873-1881). As chief, Prince oversaw the militarization of the Toronto police.

Prince was born in Cheltenham, Gloucestershire, the son of Colonel John Prince, and his wife, Mary Ann Millington. His father was an English barrister who emigrated to Canada in 1833 and became a member of the legislative assembly, a colonel in the militia, businessman and ultimately a judge.

William Prince enlisted in the British Army in 1837 and rose to the rank of Captain. He fought in the Crimean War in 1854, returned to Canada in 1856 and was appointed Chief Constable of the Toronto Police Department in 1859.

Prince's predecessor, Samuel Sherwood, was fired along with the entire police force as the result of lack of discipline, corruption and rioting. Half of the police force was re-hired, most of them younger recruits.

Under Prince, the police were organized under military discipline to the extent that unmarried constables were required to be housed in special barracks and needed approval to marry. In 1872, Prince introduced a timed beat system in which officers were to follow minute by minute schedules when walking their beat. The police force of 60 threatened to go on strike and were fired as a result. When officers asked for their jobs back, 18 were refused. Police were required to participate in drills three times a week but were also required to be moderate in their use of force in contrast to abuses that had occurred previously.

Prince resigned as chief constable in 1873 in order to become the first warden of the new Toronto Central Prison at King and Strachan Streets. Imposing military discipline, the prison became known for its brutality with stories of prisoners being beaten to death and buried on the prison grounds. In 1880, Prince ordered that an American prisoner be flogged nearly to death. The American embassy in Ottawa complained and the Attorney-General of Ontario ordered, in 1881, that the brutality stop and that flogging not occur without his permission. Prince resigned the same month and took a position as registrar of Wellington County.

He died in 1882 of apoplexy caused by alcoholism
