= Stitt House =

Historic house in Arkansas, United States

- U.S. National Register of Historic Places
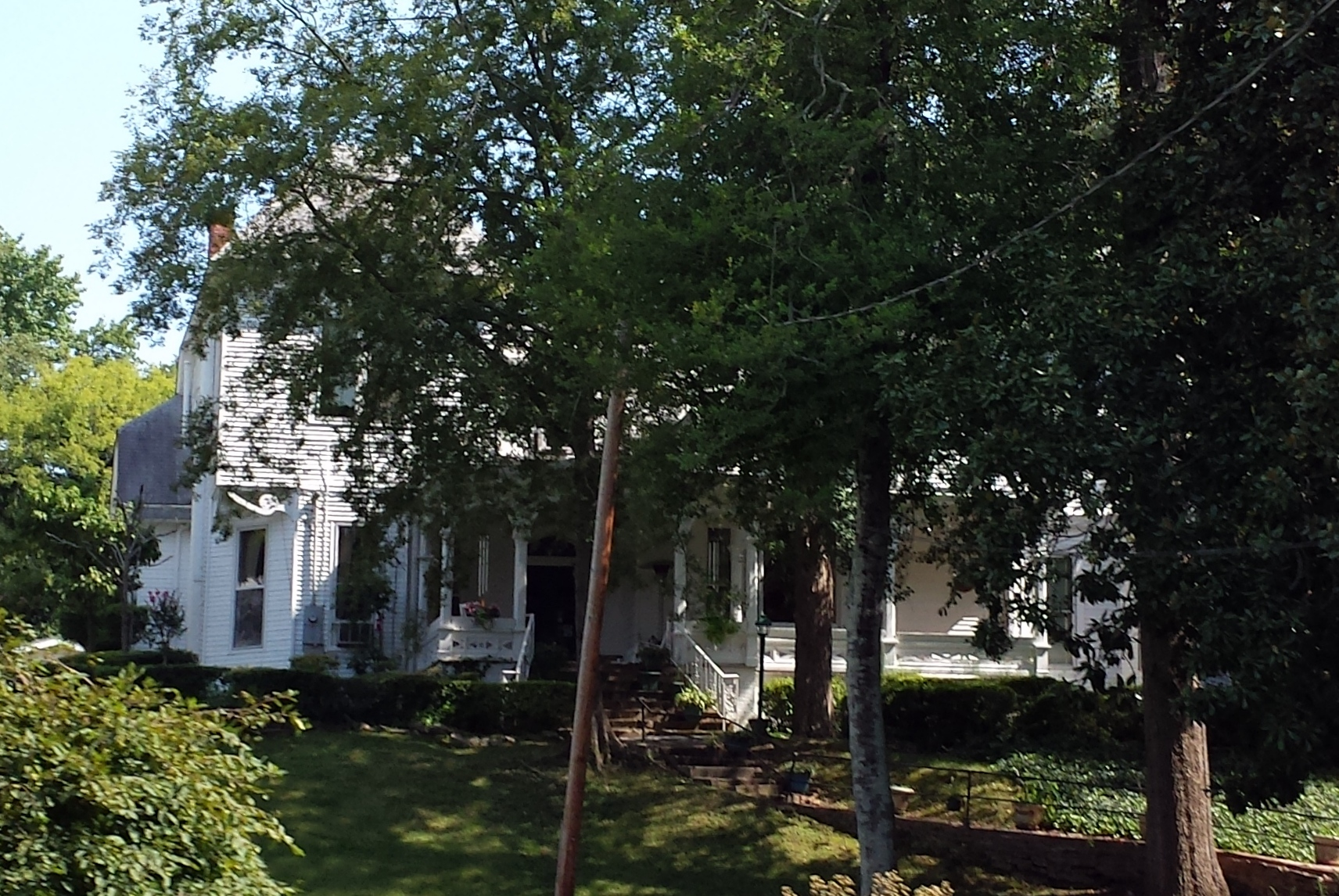

- Location within Arkansas Location within the United States
- Location: 824 Park Avenue; Hot Springs, Arkansas
- Coordinates: 34°31′44″N 93°2′59″W
- Built: 1875
- Architect: Man and Stern architects
- Architectural style: Italianate
- NRHP reference No.: 76000410
- Added to NRHP: May 3, 1976

The Stitt House is an Italianate-style house located in Hot Springs, Arkansas. It is listed on the National Register of Historic Places.

== History ==
Located in Hot Springs National Park, the Stitt House was built in 1877 by industrialist and early city founder Samuel H. Stitt. Together with Colonel Fordyce, he built the Fordyce bathhouse and founded Mountain Valley Spring Water company, and also built the first Arlington Hotel. The house was added to the National Register of Historic Places in 1976. One of the children of Samuel and Augusta Stitt, Herbert Stitt, grew up in the house. His interest in art led him to Boston, Massachusetts, where he won fame as an illustrator. Included among his work are several cover illustrations for the Saturday Evening Post.

The Stitt House has been occupied by three individuals whose lives were either closely connected with the history of Hot Springs or whose achievements transcended the local level and received national recognition. Furthermore, the Stitt House is a century-old example of eclectic Victorian architecture, which survives intact and in good condition.
