= Craig Bromell =

Canadian radio host

- Born: 1959 (age 66–67); Oshawa, Ontario
- Occupations: broadcaster, union leader, police officer, writer

Craig Bromell (born 1959 in Oshawa) is a Canadian radio personality and former police officer. Prior to his broadcast career, Bromell served as president of the Toronto Police Association from 1997 to 2003. In that position, he was often at odds with the two chiefs of police during his tenure, Julian Fantino and David Boothby. Previous to becoming TPA president, Bromell led a wildcat strike of officers in 51 Division.

In 1996, Thomas Kerr, a homeless man, claimed that he was beaten up by nine police officers, including Bromell, in retaliation for breaking another police officer's arm in a previous encounter. A settlement was made before Bromell, now head of the Toronto Police Union, was scheduled to testify and would be subject to questioning about the event in question. The internal investigator's testimony stated that police claimed that they had never picked up Kerr. However, a fingerprint of Kerr's was lifted from the cruiser that one of the officers had been using. The investigator also noticed later changes to police notebooks to make it look as though Kerr had an eye injury and was bleeding from his mouth before the alleged beating.

In 2000, the police association, under Bromell's leadership, launched a telemarketing campaign called Operation True Blue, in which donors were given windshield stickers for their cars. Critics charged that Bromell and the union were amassing a war chest in order to target political opponents, and raised the concern that police officers could offer special privilege (such as disregarding minor traffic infractions, etc.) to people whose cars bore the stickers. Fantino soon forced the campaign to cease. That same year, Bromell released a list of 17 councillors he recommended that the union endorse during the municipal elections. All of the 17 were conservatives who advocated curtailing the right of the municipal police services board to review internal affairs, especially in the city's racial profiling controversy.

Bromell stepped down as head of the police association in 2003 and was succeeded by Rick McIntosh.

In 2004, Bromell became a late morning radio host for talk radio station AM640 Toronto Radio, co-hosting The Beat briefly with 640's former news director Ross MacLeod, before permanent co-host Tina Trigiani was selected. The show was rebranded Bromell! in 2006, with co-host John Downs as Trigiani went on a temporary professional leave. Bromell left AM640 in August 2007.

The television series The Bridge is loosely based upon Bromell's tenure as head of the police union. Bromell is the executive producer. The lead character, Frank Leo, is modeled upon Bromell and played by Aaron Douglas.

In 2012, Bromell became the first head of the new Building Union of Canada. The union planned to unionize non-unionized workers in the construction field. It got into a dispute with the existing Laborers' International Union of North America over raids by BUC on LIUNA workplaces.
