= Clergy Corporation =

The Clergy Corporation, or the Clergy Reserve Corporation of Upper Canada, existed to oversee, manage and lease the Clergy reserves of Upper Canada, a large amount of land in Upper Canada that had been put aside for the Anglican and later Protestant churches. The main operations of the corporation were to collect rents on these lands, receive petitions, answer inquiries and settle all disputes arising from the clergy land.

There was similarly a Clergy Corporation of Lower Canada.

== History ==
The corporation began as a body in 1818, when it was established by the Upper Canada Executive Council. It was officially commissioned by Lieutenant Governor Sir Peregrine Maitland in 1819. Its origin stemmed from a strict interpretation of the Constitutional Act of 1791 by the Family Compact, led by John Strachan, to keep the clergy reserves for the Church of England. The new Corporation had twelve members: the Bishop of Quebec, who acted as chair, both the Inspector and Surveyors General, the Rectors of York, Kingston, Niagara, Grimsby, Cornwall, Ancaster, Hamilton and Newcastle, and two other members of the Anglican clergy. The Corporation directed the local sheriffs to collect the various rents.

The first meeting of the corporation was held at York on 25 March 1820. Stephen Heward, who was Auditor General of Land Patents, was appointed Secretary Receiver of the corporation. Five years later the Executive Council ordered that the corporation should cease making any new leases of the reserves, as it had been thought that the land would be sold to the Canada Company. This option was championed by Egerton Ryerson, who was upset at the state of the reserves and wanted them to be available to the Methodists. In August 1828 Heward, the Secretary Receiver, died and was succeeded by George Herchmer Markland.

The issuance of new leases resumed in April 1829. However this only continued until 1832, when the Lieutenant Governor advised the corporation to discontinue the issuance of leases after a bill was passed to combine the clergy reserves with Crown land. At this point, Markland was appointed Inspector General and a new Secretary Receiver, Thomas Baines, was appointed by the Lieutenant Governor in 1833. With no new leases being issued, the actions of the corporation were confined to overseeing former leases, which had not yet become very lucrative. Baines undertook a plan to change this and appointed Clerks of the Peace as District Commissioners to undertake a survey of each individual lot in Upper Canada.

The result of this was a huge increase in lease revenues, but the full amount of rent was still unattained. In view of this and increased pressure against the idea of Anglican clergy lands held by the Family Compact, the Executive Council decided in 1838 to dissolve the corporation and to transfer Baines into the Crown Lands Department, where he would continue to oversee the collection of payments in arrears on clergy reserve leases and oversee the sale of Crown land in Upper Canada. At this point both the Clergy Corporation and the Clergy Reserves were largely dissolved; the lands were officially secularized in 1854.
