= H. J. Grasett =

Canadian army and militia officer

Lieutenant-Colonel H. J. Grasett CMG

Chief Constable of the Toronto Police Department
- In office 1886–1920
- Preceded by: Francis Collier Draper
- Succeeded by: Samuel Dickson

Personal details
- Born: June 18, 1847 Toronto, Canada West
- Died: September 30, 1930 (aged 83) Toronto, Ontario, Canada
- Spouse: Katharine Parke (m. 1887; div. 1926)
- Occupation: Army officer

Lieutenant-Colonel Henry James Grasett CMG (June 18, 1847 – September 30, 1930) was a Canadian army and militia officer who served as a Toronto police chief. He is the longest-serving police chief in the history of the Toronto Police, having served for 34 years from 1886 to 1920 as chief constable.

== Life and career ==
=== Early life ===
Grasett was the third son of the Reverend Henry James Grasett, the Rector of St. James Cathedral in Toronto, and Sarah Maria Stewart. He was educated at a Toronto private school and at Leamington College for Boys in England.

=== Military service ===
At 19, he returned to Canada and joined the Canadian Militia. He fought on the Niagara Peninsula during the Fenian raid of 1866 with the 2nd Battalion, Volunteer Militia Rifles of Toronto, In 1867, he joined the British Army serving as an ensign with 100th (Prince of Wales's Royal Canadian) Regiment of Foot in Canada and England and rose to the rank of lieutenant by the time he retired to Toronto in 1875, where he became a partner in a firm of shipping and commission merchants. In 1885, he was given the rank of lieutenant colonel in the militia and put in command of the 10th Battalion Royal Grenadiers which fought in several battles during the North-West Rebellion of 1885.

=== Toronto Police ===
On December 1, 1886, Grasett was appointed Chief Constable of Toronto. During his command of the Toronto Police he saw the force grow from 172 to 662 men. Under Grasett, the police remained largely British and Protestant in composition. Patrolmen were armed for the first time under Grasett. He also oversaw innovations such as the institution of an electric call box and signal system, patrol wagons, bicycles, motorcycles and ultimately police cars and also reorganized the morality squad and department of detectives. Training and promotion was modelled on the military.

Grasett served as vice-president of the International Association of Chiefs of Police in 1902 and as president of the Chief Constables' Association of Canada in 1906.

Unlike previous Toronto chief constables, Grasett largely refrained from making controversial public statements except during World War I when he spoke out against foreigners in Toronto and banned outdoor anti-conscription meetings. He was appointed to the Order of St Michael and St George in 1916 for his contributions to the war effort.

In 1918, dissatisfied with wages, discipline and work conditions, Toronto police constables unionized, joined the Toronto Trades and Labour Council, and went on strike. At the provincial commission that was created to investigate the unrest, Grasett expressed his opposition to one of the union's key demands, promotion by seniority.

Grasett retired as chief constable in 1920, at the age of 73. He died of pneumonia at his home in 1930 and was buried in St James' Cemetery. He was survived by his widow Alice Katherine Parke, who he had married in 1887 in Brompton, London. Alice Katherine was a great-niece of Charles Parke, a Deputy Lieutenant of Dorset in England. They had no children.
