= Samuel J. Dickson =

Canadian police chief (1867–1964)

Samuel Dickson
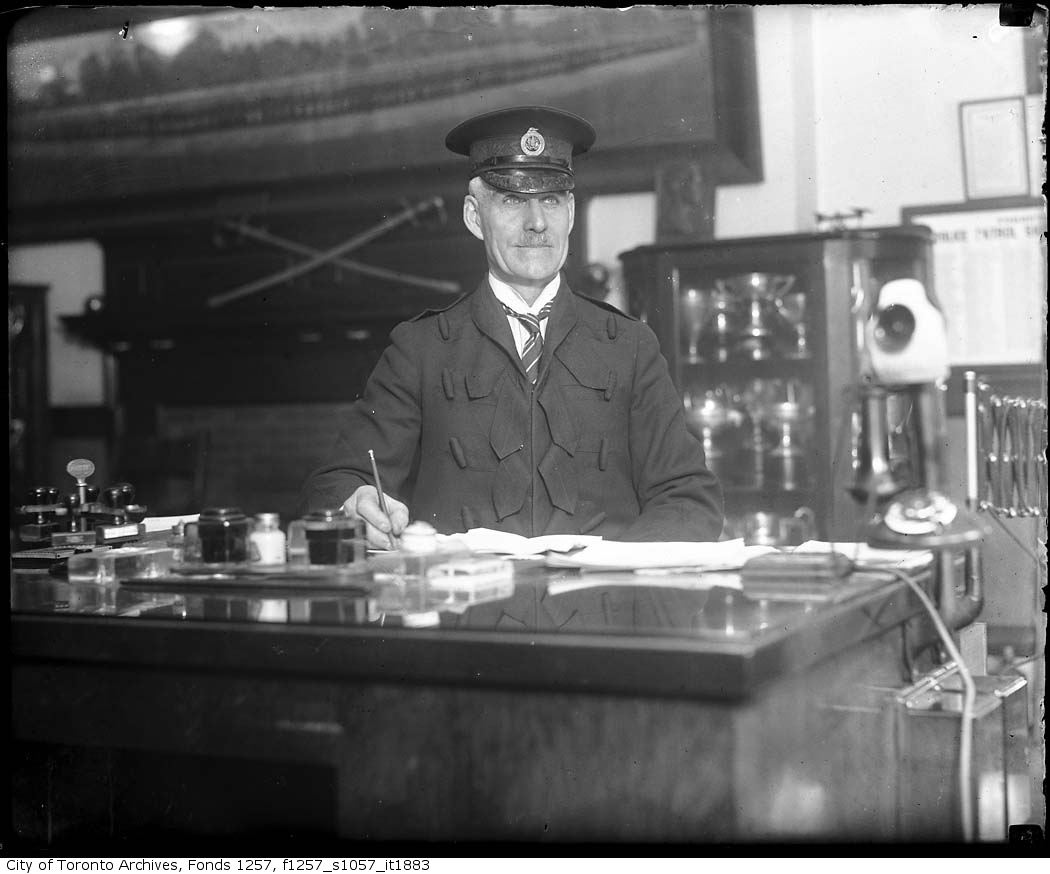
- Dickson c. 1925

Chief Constable of the Toronto Police Department
- In office 1920–1928
- Preceded by: H. J. Grasett
- Succeeded by: Dennis Draper

Personal details
- Born: 1867 Ireland
- Died: 1964 (aged 97) Toronto, Ontario, Canada

Samuel J. Dickson (1867–1964) was chief of the Toronto Police Department from 1920 to 1928.

Dickson was born in Ireland in 1867. His family moved to Canada during his early life. During the 1890s, Dickson enrolled in the Toronto Police Department. Thirty years after joining the Toronto Police Department, he was promoted to chief constable and became the 10th chief of police in 1920 until 1928, when he retired.
