= William Higgins (high constable) =

Canadian police chief

High Bailiff of the Toronto Police Department
- In office 1834–1834
- Preceded by: Position established
- Succeeded by: George Kingsmill

High Constable of the Home District
- In office 1826–1834
- Succeeded by: Position abolished

William Higgins was the first high constable of the Toronto Police Department, appointed as High Bailiff after Toronto's incorporation in 1834.

Higgins was appointed High Constable of the Home District in 1826, a position that included being inspector of police for York, Upper Canada at a salary of £40 a year. When the city of Toronto was incorporated in 1834, the new city council unanimously appointed Higgins as High Bailiff, including the responsibility of being city inspector, with a salary of £125 a year while remaining High Constable (as well as the only constable) for the region.

Higgins' term ended in scandal when he was implicated in the death of a man during election day anti-Tory rioting by largely disenfranchised Irish Catholic minority which was put down by a party of Protestant Orangemen, led by Higgins. Mayor William Lyon Mackenzie, in his role as chief magistrate, held a police court investigation and laid charges against Higgins. He was exonerated by the grand jury in April 1835 but, by that point city council had already chosen not to reappoint him.

He was subsequently appointed High Constable of York County and served for many years.
