= George Kingsmill =

Canadian administrator (1808-1852)

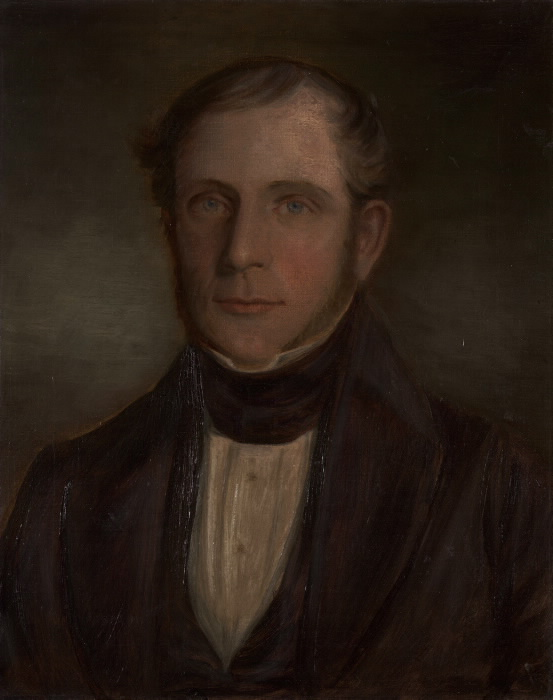

High Constable of the Toronto Police Department
- In office 1835–1835
- Preceded by: William Higgins
- Succeeded by: James Stitt
- In office 1837–1846
- Preceded by: James Stitt
- Succeeded by: Samuel Sherwood

Personal details
- Born: 1808 Queen's County, Ireland
- Died: 1852 (aged 43–44) Galt, Canada West
- Occupation: Soldier, merchant

George Kingsmill (1808–1852) was the High Constable of Toronto in 1835 and from 1837 to 1846.

Kingsmill was born in Queen's County, Ireland. He joined the British Army and, after being decommissioned, settled in Toronto in 1829 and ran a provision store on Market Street where he supplied sailing vessels and steamers passing through the city's port. He was appointed High Constable in 1835, was succeeded by James Stitt in 1836 and was then re-appointed to the position in 1837.

In 1835, he was appointed the second High Constable of Toronto, however, he was the first to not also be the city's only constable. During his tenure, in 1835, the Toronto Police Department was first organized when the city retained five full-time constables, the first organized police force in Canada. Kingsmill was a member of the Orange Order and he recruited his constables from the Order's ranks, a practice later found by a provincial commission of inquiry to have led the police to take a highly sectarian character. This was a period of sectarian conflict in Toronto between the Protestant majority and the largely Irish Catholic minority and the police often supported their fellow Orangemen during anti-Catholic rioting. During the Upper Canada Rebellion of 1837, Kingsmill aided the Lieutenant Governor of Upper Canada, Sir Francis Bond Head, in putting down the uprising. and in the years following the 1837 Rebellion also were used by incumbent Tory politicians to break up meetings of Reformers.

Kingsmill retired from business in 1842 and died in Galt in 1852.

Kingsmill's nephew, Thomas Frazer Kingsmill, settled in London, Ontario and established Kingsmill's Department Store in 1865 which remained in operation until 2014.
