= James Ramer =

Canadian police officer

James Ramer MOM
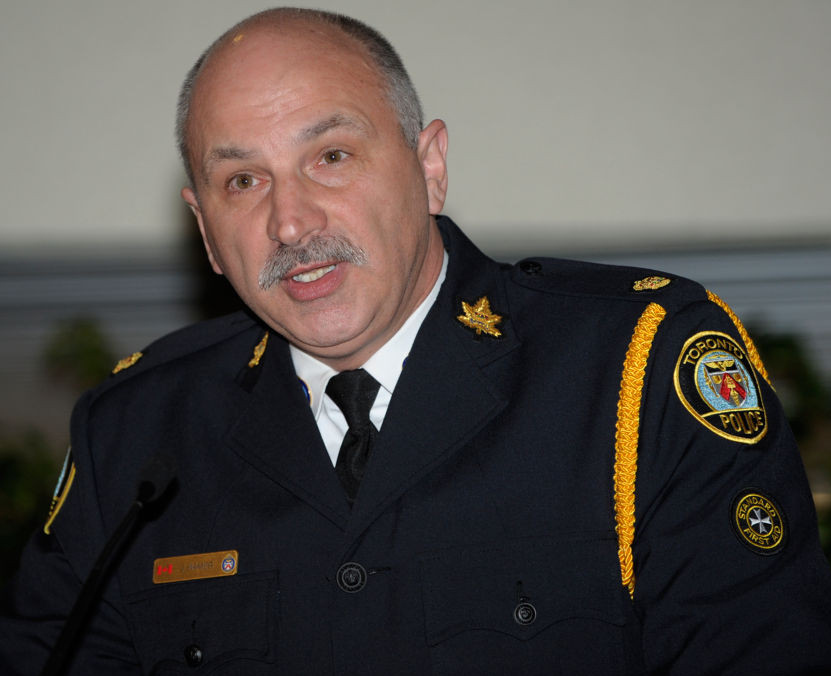
- James Ramer in 2010

Interim Chief of the Toronto Police Service
- In office August 1, 2020 – December 19, 2022
- Preceded by: Mark Saunders
- Succeeded by: Myron Demkiw

Personal details
- Occupation: Police officer

Donald James Ramer MOM is a Canadian police officer who served as interim chief of police with the Toronto Police Service (TPS) from August 1, 2020 to December 19, 2022.

== Education ==
Ramer graduated from the University of Toronto with a Bachelor of Arts degree in English and history, and he did post-graduate studies in industrial relations and Ontario history.

== Career ==
Ramer joined the Metropolitan Toronto Police since 1980. He served as Deputy Chief of Specialized Operations Command under Chief Mark Saunders.

Following Saunders' resignation, Ramer was named interim chief on August 1, 2020.

On September 15, 2022, it was announced that Ramer will be succeeded as chief on December 19, 2022 by Myron Demkiw.
