= William J. McCormack (police officer) =

Canadian police officer

Chief of the Metropolitan Toronto Police
- In office 1989–1995
- Preceded by: Jack Marks
- Succeeded by: David Boothby

Personal details
- Born: 21 February 1933 Mauritius
- Died: 8 September 2016 (aged 83)
- Relations: William McCormack Sr - father Margaret Moylan - mother
- Education: Mill Meece Police Training School; Atlantic College, Dublin
- Occupation: police officer
- Profession: marine radio officer, colonial police officer

William Joseph McCormack (21 February 1933 – 8 September 2016) was Chief of Police of the Metro Toronto Police from 1989 to 1995. He succeeded Jack Marks. Earlier in his life McCormack was a marine radio operator and British colonial police officer before coming to Canada in the late 1950s.

== Life and career ==
McCormack was born in Beau-Bassin, Mauritius, then went on to graduate from Atlantic College in Dublin in 1951. McCormack went to sea as a civilian employee of the Marconi International Marine Communication Limited aboard British Merchant Navy ships during the Korean War where he served as a radio officer on several ships.

He was the son of British Colonial Police colonel William McCormack who was decorated with an MBE by the King for his work with prison reform and children's polio.

After completing training in the Staffordshire County Police, the younger McCormack served as a Constable in Bermuda Police Force from 1955 to 1959. With another constable of the Bermuda Police, Rick Hodgson (who would go on to become a Superintendent in the Ontario Provincial Police), he had pulled over Jean Orilla Kernick, a Canadian employed as a bank teller by the Bank of Bermuda, who was riding a moped with a faulty light. The two married in 1958 at St. Theresa's cathedral in the City of Hamilton, with the reception held at Admiralty House, Bermuda (which had been pressed into use as accommodation for police officers, including McCormack, after the Commander-in-Chief of the America and West Indies Station had been abolished in 1956) and returned to Toronto with her in 1960. before coming to Canada and joining the Metropolitan Toronto Police. Before becoming chief of police, he served years as a homicide detective in Toronto. Following his retirement, he detailed his experiences and some of his notable cases in a co-authored book.

The couple had five children, four of whom later became police officers. Michael is the former president of the Toronto Police Association, leaving that position in 2020., Kathy is an OPP sergeant, and Jamie is a Toronto police detective. A son also named William resigned from his post as a plainclothes Toronto police officer in 2009 following an internal misconduct investigation; criminal charges for soliciting and accepting bribes in that regard were subsequently stayed for 6 years of excessive delays by Crown prosecution, with the judge laying blame on the lead police investigator.

In 2007, he joined other former Toronto chiefs, including David Boothby, Jack Marks and Julian Fantino at a 50th anniversary celebration of the Toronto Police Service at the headquarters building. McCormack died on 8 September 2016 at the age of 83.

== Awards ==
- Police Exemplary Service Medal (1983)
- Bar to the Police Exemplary Service Medal (1989)
- Queen Elizabeth II Golden Jubilee Medal (2002)
- Queen Elizabeth II Diamond Jubilee medal (2013)
