= Toronto Central Prison =

Men's prison

Coordinates: 43.638789°N 79.414503°W

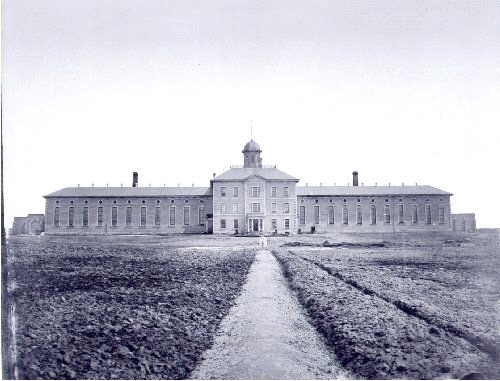
- Interactive map of Toronto Central Prison
- Location: Toronto, Ontario
- Status: Closed
- Security class: Maximum
- Capacity: 336
- Opened: 1873
- Closed: 1915
- Warden: William Stratton Prince (1873-1881)

The Toronto Central Prison, also known as the Central Prison, Central Prison for Men, and more colloquially as The Toronto Jail (the third of four Toronto area jails to be given that nickname) was a prison in Toronto, Ontario, Canada. It was a 336-bed facility located near the intersection of King Street and Strachan Avenue. It opened in 1873, when the area was still well away from any residential development. The prison was intended as an industrial facility and began with the manufacturing of railway cars for the Canada Car Company. Hard work and discipline were considered the best forms of rehabilitation and active industry would raise money for the prison.

The prison should have flourished as an example of modern penal facility of its time, but by the 1880s it had a well-deserved reputation for brutality. Its first warden, William Stratton Prince, was an alcoholic ex-military officer who resigned as chief of the Toronto Police to take the position. During his tenure he was accused of ordering extreme beatings, denying medical treatment, and supporting clandestine, nighttime burials. Wardens who followed tried to adopt a less disciplinarian approach, but the guards continued to brutalize the inmates. In 1911, Dr. J.T. Gilmour, one of the more reformist wardens, made news in the United States with his new outdoor work program, specifically one that allowed inmates to work without armed guards. Dr. Gilmour's reforms were not enough to overcome the prison's reputation. The Toronto Historical Association sums up the facility's reputation: "Central Prison represents one of the most shameful parts of the city's history, and its severe conditions and brutality are shocking".

In 1915, the prison was abandoned as changing attitudes toward crime and punishment led to a revamping of the province’s correctional system and replaced by the Ontario Reformatory in Guelph. For the next five years, the facility was used as an army base and a processing centre for new immigrants. In 1920, the main prison building was demolished and much of the land sold for use by the railroads. Remaining buildings ended up being used by Hobb's, Dr. Ballard's, and finally by the neighbouring John Inglis and Company Limited factory until 1981. During its operation the prison also had an out-camp with a shale and clay quarry on property in Mimico. That property and its buildings became part of what is now known as the Mimico Correctional Centre when the prison closed.

All that remains today is the Central Prison's Roman Catholic chapel on East Liberty Street (added to the main building in 1877) and a wall of the prison's paint shop. The chapel became part of the city’s inventory of heritage properties in 1985. The wall is now part of the east wall of the A. R. Williams Company Liberty Storage Warehouse on Lynn Williams Street. The Williams company purchased the paint shop property after the closure of the prison and demolished the building. The Williams warehouse is itself now a listed heritage property.

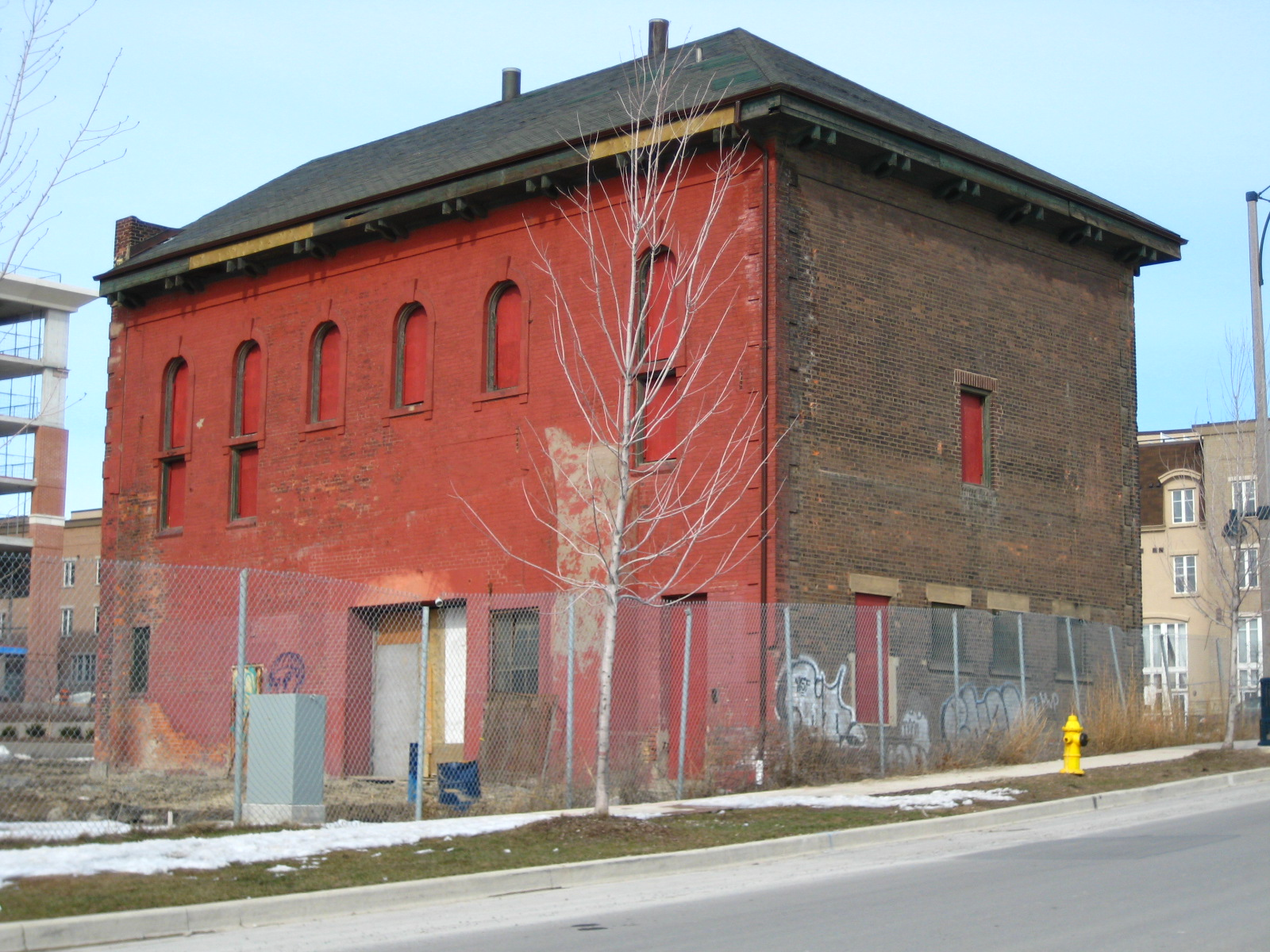
East side of the Toronto Central Prison Chapel

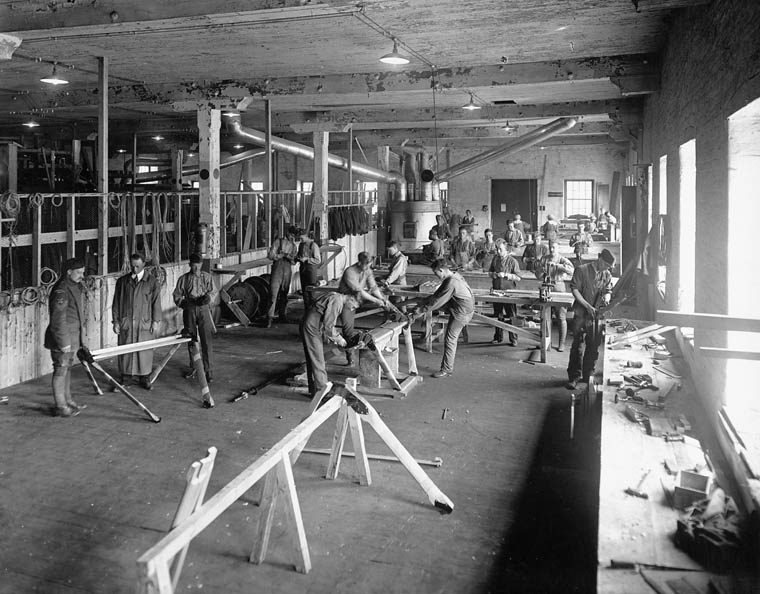
The prison in use as the Aeroplane Repair Park in 1917 during WWI

== See also ==
- Toronto Central Prison Chapel
- List of correctional facilities in Ontario
