= David Boothby =

Canadian police chief

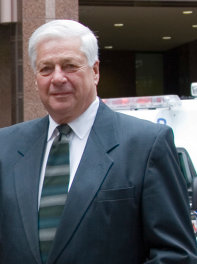
- David Boothby in 2007

Chief of the Toronto Police Service
- In office 1998–2000
- Preceded by: Position established
- Succeeded by: Julian Fantino

Chief of the Metropolitan Toronto Police
- In office 1995–1998
- Preceded by: William J. McCormack
- Succeeded by: Position merged

Personal details
- Born: David J. Boothby; 1944 (age 81–82) Keswick, Ontario, Canada
- Profession: Police officer

David J. Boothby (born 1944) is a retired Canadian police officer who served as the final chief of the Metro Toronto Police from 1995 to 1997, and once the Metro Toronto Police was amalgamated into Toronto Police Service, he served as its chief until his retirement in 2000.

Boothby was born in Keswick, Ontario. He joined the then Metro Toronto Police in 1964 as a beat officer and became a homicide detective in 1978.

== Career ==
Prior to becoming police chief, Boothby was the unit commander or superintendent of 52 Division, the division that covered much of the downtown business and residential area from Spadina to Jarvis, the Lake to south of Summerhill. The gay community's village of Church and Wellesley was within the Division's boundaries. He was instrumental in beginning a dialogue between the lesbian and gay communities and the police force; a force that had a violent history in dealing with the gay and lesbian community especially after the bathhouse raids of 5 February 1981. He established a Church/Wellesley foot patrol and a series of sensitivity training sessions for his patrol staff. Community policing was an integral part of his approach to the police service.

Boothby's rise to the chief's post was seen as a change from the style of William J. McCormack, but he had a difficult time with the Toronto Police union president Craig Bromell. His management style was seen by some as soft and was suspected to contribute to his departure from the force.

He was succeeded by Julian Fantino in 2000.

Since 2000, Boothby has been involved in various charities and local associations:

- member of the Canadian National Sportsmen's Shows Board of Directors
- Consultant, Giesecke & Devrient Card Security
- Task Force Member for the Ministry of Public Safety and Security Task Force on Reform and Correctional Services
- Chair of Jake's House for Children with Autism Board of Directors
- President of the West Side Pine Lake Cottagers Association

== Honours ==
Boothby has received the following honours:

- Police Exemplary Service Medal (awarded on May 22, 1985)
  - First bar (awarded on August 26, 1996)
- Fire Services Exemplary Service Medal (awarded on October 2, 1998)
- Queen Elizabeth II Golden Jubilee Medal (awarded in 2002)
