= Samuel Sherwood (high constable) =

High Constable, Toronto Police Department

High Constable of the Toronto Police Department
- In office 1852–1859
- Preceded by: George Allen
- Succeeded by: William Stratton Prince

Personal details
- Born: 31 August 1819 Brockville, Upper Canada
- Died: 23 October 1867 (aged 48) Toronto, Canada West
- Party: Tory
- Relations: Levius Peters Sherwood (father); Henry Sherwood (brother); George Sherwood (brother)
- Occupation: Tavern owner

Samuel Sherwood (1819–1867) was High Constable of the Toronto Police Department from 1852 to 1859. He was the son of Levius Peters Sherwood. A tavern owner with ties to the Tory Family Compact, his brother, Henry Sherwood was Mayor of Toronto and then co-premier of the Province of Canada in the 1840s. Another brother, George Sherwood, was a member of the Legislative Assembly of the Province of Canada and eventually a judge.

According to Conyngham Crawford Taylor, Samuel Sherwood was “a quiet, good-natured man, who did not insist on any strict regulations as to the dress or discipline of the men. They wore a uniform, but without uniformity, except in one respect—they were universally slovenly.” His stewardship of the police force was accordingly lax. Most officers were Orangemen, at a time when Toronto was riven by religious sectarianism between the more affluent Protestant majority and the poorer Catholic minority, and showed favouritism to other members of the Orange Order, even to the point of joining them in brawling with Catholics in the six major instances of sectarian rioting between 1852 and 1858, including the Toronto circus riot in 1855. In March 1858, Sherwood himself refused to testify against a fellow Orangeman implicated in rioting at the St Patrick's Day parade.

Sherwood was appointed chief constable despite the fact that a provincial inquiry had implicated him in the 1841 election riot that followed his brother's electoral defeat that year. Sherwood had allegedly organized an armed gang inside the Coleraine Tavern which opened fire upon participants in the rival candidate's victory parade.

In 1858, Sherwood let the prime suspect in the robbery of the Bank of Upper Canada go free prompting the mayor, William Henry Boulton, to order an inquiry. Sherwood quarreled with Boulton in the press, accusing him of running a star chamber proceeding against him, resulting in Boulton recommending Sherwood's suspension to city council. Council voted 14 to 10 in favour of Sherwood resulting in Boulton resigning as mayor, though he ran in the subsequent election.

The scandal resulted in provincial legislation that required the appointment of an independent police board. The body, the Toronto Board of Police Commissioners was appointed in 1859 and fired Sherwood and the entire police force in order to replace them with a better trained, disciplined force.

Sherwood went on to be Toronto's harbour master.
