= James Herbert Stitt =

Canadian politician

James Herbert Stitt (July 25, 1891 – November 29, 1958) was a Canadian politician and lawyer.

Stitt was born in Picton, Ontario and was educated at Queen's University and the University of Manitoba Law School. After graduating he practiced law in Winnipeg, Manitoba.

During World War I he joined the Canadian Expeditionary Force and served in Europe with the 6th Field Company of the Canadian Engineers and the Canadian Field Artillery.

He gained notoriety during 1927 as the defense attorney for American serial killer Earle Nelson.

He was elected to the House of Commons of Canada in the 1930 federal election as a Conservative representing Selkirk and served for five years. He did not stand for re-election in 1935 after being appointed to the Civil Service Commission, with which he served for a decade.
