= James Stitt (high constable) =

Canadian police chief

High Constable of the Toronto Police Department
- In office 1836–1836
- Preceded by: George Kingsmill
- Succeeded by: George Kingsmill

Personal details
- Born: 1804 Ireland
- Died: 1891 (aged 86–87) Toronto, Ontario, Canada
- Occupation: Businessman

James Stitt (1804—November 23, 1891) was High Constable of Toronto. He was born in Ireland in 1804 and emigrated to Canada around 1830. In 1836, he was appointed High Constable of Toronto and served for one year. He subsequently entered the cartage business.

He was appointed a customs officer in Toronto in 1850 and held that position until 1874.
