= Canadian seat of government dispute =

Long-running political dispute in the Province of Canada

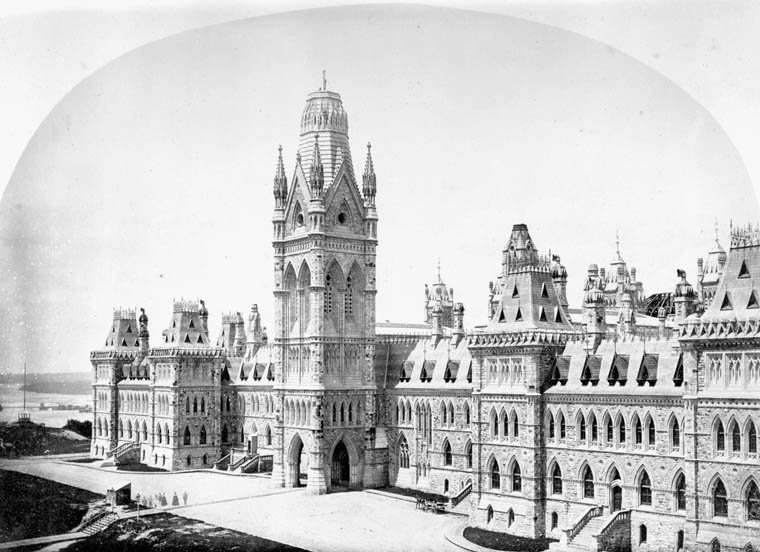
- Parliament Buildings, Ottawa, the final seat of government of the Province of Canada
- Duration: 1841–1866
- Location: Kingston, Canada West (1841–1843); Montreal, Canada East (1844–1849); Toronto, Canada West (1850–1851); Quebec, Canada East (1851–1855); Toronto (1856–1859); Quebec (1859–1865); Ottawa, Canada West (1866)
- Type: Political issue in the Province of Canada
- Cause: Lengthy dispute over the location of the seat of government
- Outcome: Ottawa becomes seat of government, 1866

The Canadian seat of government dispute was a long-running political issue in the Province of Canada from 1841 to 1866. During that time, the seat of government moved six times, to five different cities. Originally located in Kingston, the seat of government moved to Montreal, to Toronto (twice), to Quebec City (twice), and finally to Ottawa. Significant political debates occurred each time it moved, as the issue triggered strong regional rivalries.

Numerous votes in the Legislative Assembly of the Province of Canada from 1841 onward failed to establish a fixed seat of government. In 1857, the government of John A. Macdonald and George-Étienne Cartier, possibly following a suggestion from Governor General Sir Edmund Walker Head, proposed that the matter be referred to Queen Victoria to decide. The Legislative Assembly passed a resolution calling on the Queen to make the decision. Late in 1857, Victoria decided in favour of Ottawa.

Even with the Queen's decision, the proposal for Ottawa did not gain immediate support. In 1858, the Macdonald–Cartier ministry resigned after losing a confidence vote on the proposed move to Ottawa. They were able to return to office after a few days, in the Double Shuffle, but the issue remained divisive. In 1859, there was another motion in the Assembly to establish Ottawa as the seat of government. That motion passed after a lengthy debate, on the condition that the Parliament would move again to Quebec during the construction of parliament buildings in Ottawa. The issue was raised again in 1860, when Ottawa was finally confirmed as the seat of government by a strong majority in the Assembly.

In 1860, construction began in Ottawa. Significant cost overruns temporarily halted construction, but by 1865 the new Parliament Buildings were complete. In 1866, the Parliament of the Province of Canada met in the new buildings for its final session. After Canadian Confederation, the new Parliament of Canada met in the buildings for the first time in November 1867.

== Creation of the Province of Canada, 1841 ==
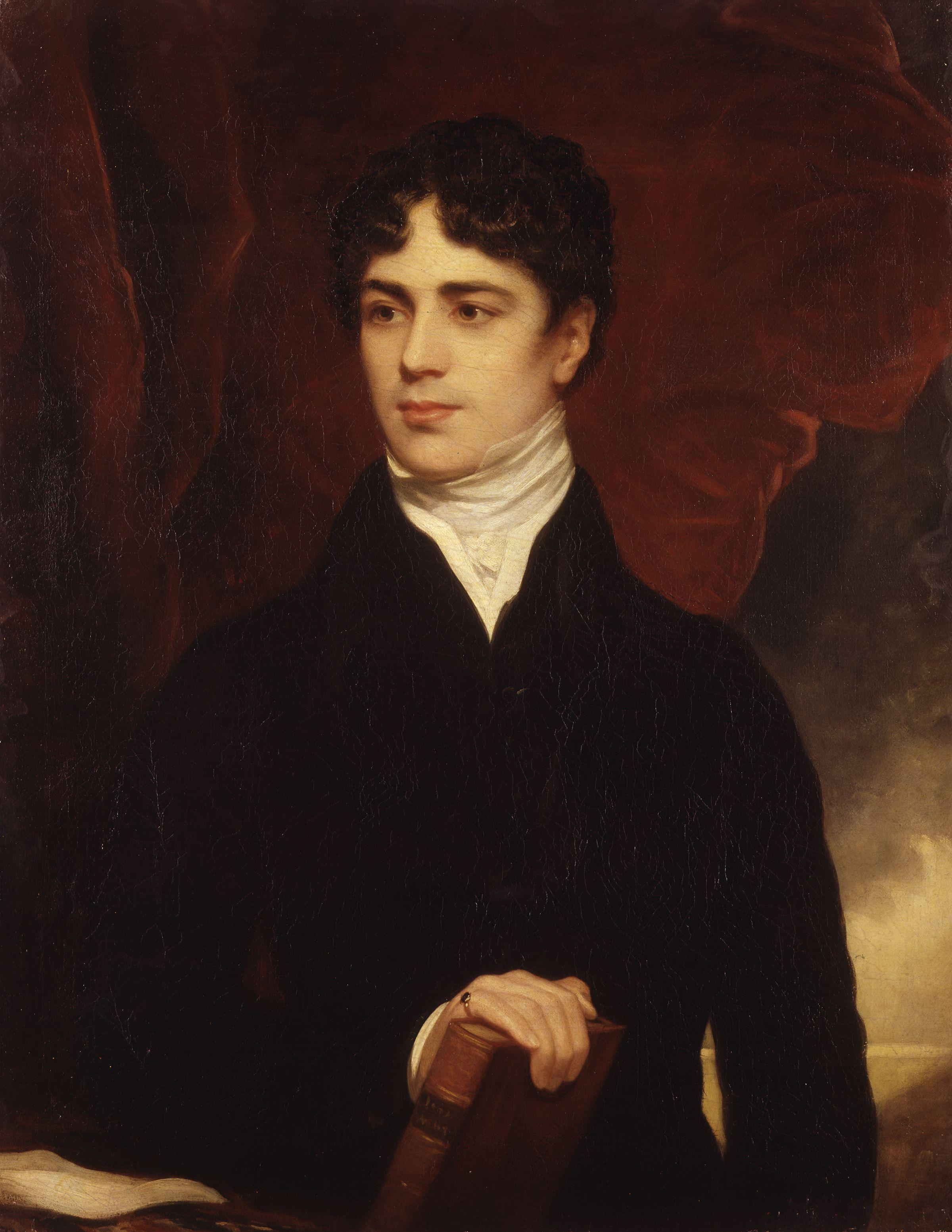
Lord Durham, who recommended the unification of the Canadas

Following the Rebellions of 1837–1838 in Lower Canada and Upper Canada, the British government decided to unify the two Canadas into a single province, based on the recommendation of Lord Durham in the Durham Report. The British Parliament passed the Union Act, 1840, which created the Province of Canada, effective February 10, 1841. The two Canadas became administrative regions in the new province: Lower Canada became Canada East (now Quebec), and Upper Canada became Canada West (now Ontario). The Union Act created a single parliament for the new province.

The Union Act did not determine the location of the seat of government for the new Parliament. Instead, the act gave the Governor General the power to determine where Parliament would meet. Prior to unification, Toronto had been the seat of government for Upper Canada, and Quebec for Lower Canada.

== Locations of the seat of government, 1841–1865 ==
=== Kingston (1841–1843) ===
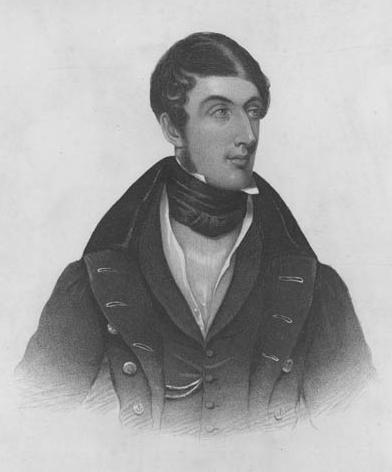
Lord Sydenham, who selected Kingston as the first seat of government

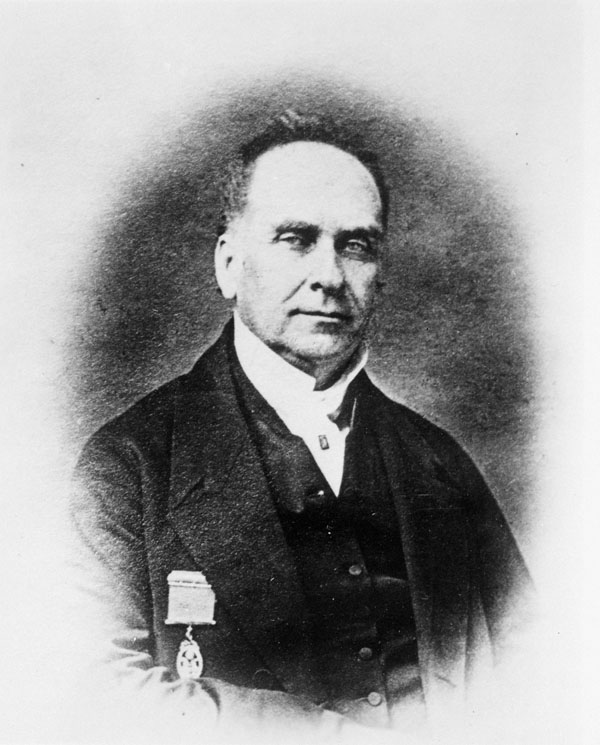
Robert Baldwin, who introduced the resolution to move to Montreal

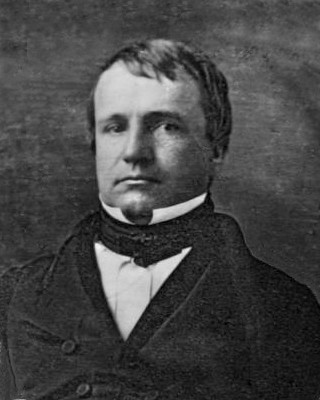
Louis-Hippolyte LaFontaine, who seconded the resolution

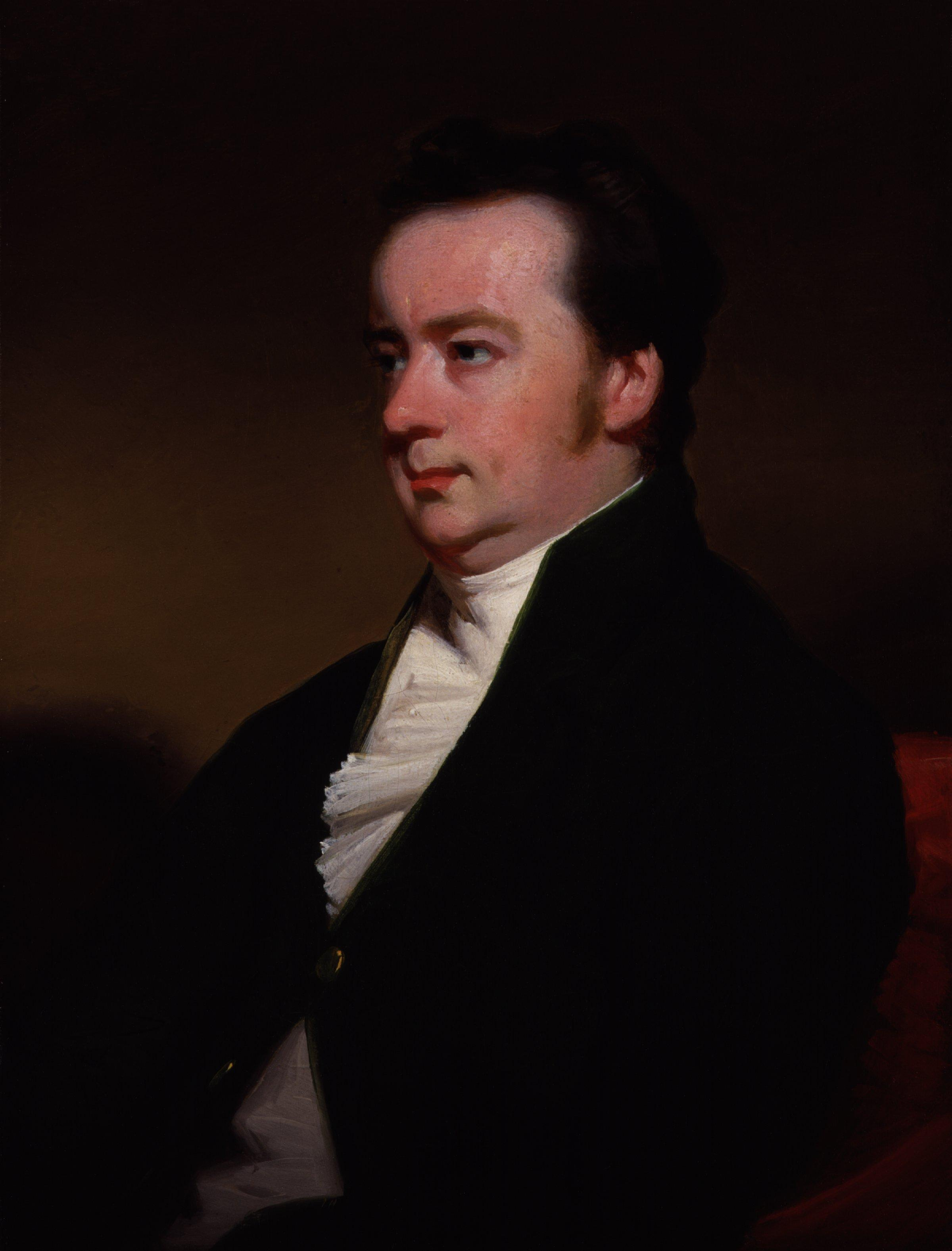
Governor General Sir Charles Metcalfe, who approved the move to Montreal

The first governor general of the new province was Charles Poulett Thomson, later Lord Sydenham. Appointed prior to the Union Act coming into force, his first task was to win support for the union in the two provinces of Upper Canada and Lower Canada. In that process, he advised the members of the Legislative Assembly of Upper Canada that there was a strong likelihood that the seat of government of the new province would be in Canada West. When the Union Act came into force, he fulfilled that commitment by summoning the new Parliament to Kingston, a city of about 6,000 inhabitants in Canada West, but close to the boundary with Canada East. Since there was no major public building in Kingston, the Parliament met in the Kingston Hospital.

The choice did not prove popular with most of the members of the Parliament. Discussion about moving the seat of government began in the very first session in 1841, and continued into the sessions of 1842 and 1843. In March 1843, a committee of the provincial Executive Council prepared a report, with one dissenting opinion, calling on the British government to move the seat of government to Montreal in Canada East.

In October 1843, Governor General Sir Charles Metcalfe advised the Legislative Assembly (the lower house of the Parliament) that the British government was not prepared to direct any change to the seat of government without having the concurrence of the Legislative Assembly, and a commitment from the Assembly to pay the costs of transferring the seat of government. He also advised that the British government considered that either Kingston or Montreal could serve as seat of government, but that both Toronto and Quebec were too far from the centre of the province to be the seat of government.

The leaders of the Executive Council, Robert Baldwin and Louis-Hippolyte LaFontaine, then introduced a motion in the Assembly proposing that the seat of government move to Montreal. A lengthy debate arose. Alternative proposals were made, such as remaining in Kingston, moving to some other location in Canada West, or deferring the decision entirely to the British government. On November 3, 1843, by a vote of 54–22, the Legislative Assembly passed the resolution to move to Montreal, and committed the necessary funds for the move.

On May 10, 1844, Governor General Metcalfe summoned the second Parliament to meet in Montreal, relying on his power under the Union Act.

=== Montreal (1844–1849) ===
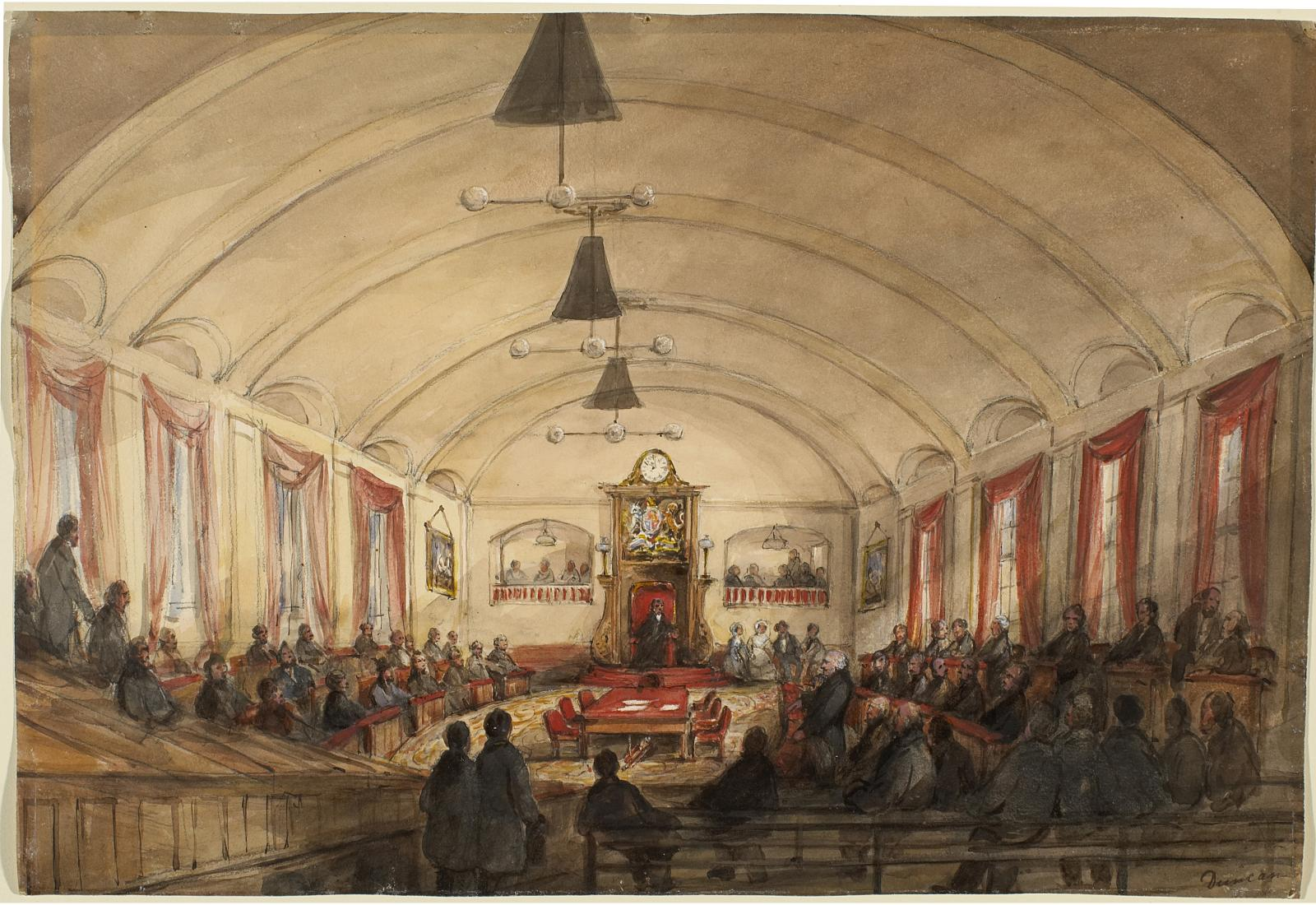
The Montreal Parliament Building in use

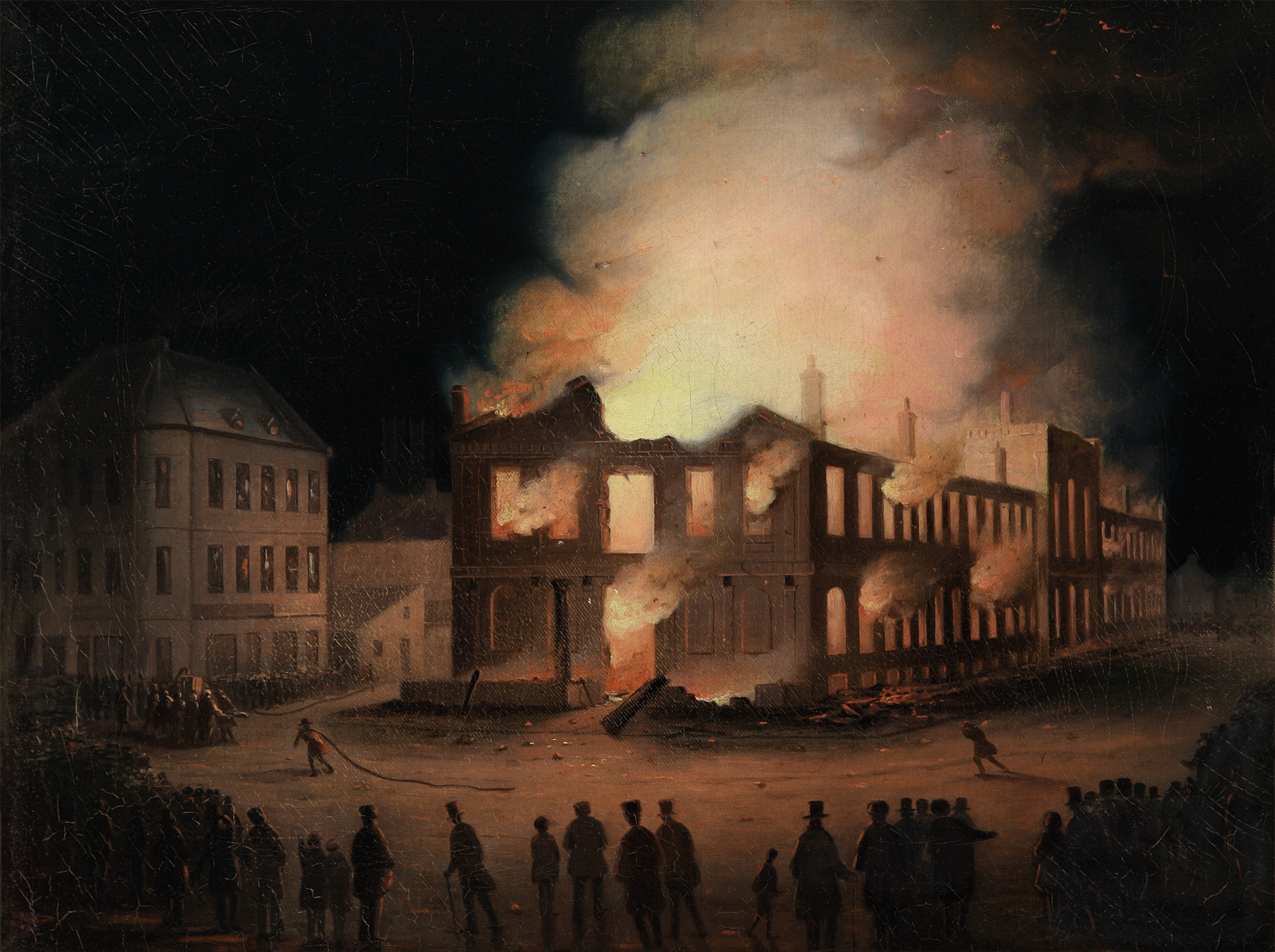
The Montreal Parliament Building in flames

In 1844, Parliament moved from Kingston to Montreal. Montreal had the attraction of being the largest city in the Province of Canada, with a population of approximately 40,000. It was the commercial centre of the province, with Canada's earliest chartered bank, the Bank of Montreal. Parliament met in the former St. Anne's Market building.

From 1844 to 1849, Montreal was the seat of government, for the entire term of the second Parliament, 1844 to 1847, and for the first and second sessions of the third Parliament, elected in 1848.

Political tensions rose after the 1848 election, which returned a Reform majority, headed by LaFontaine and Baldwin. In the 1849 legislative session, the LaFontaine–Baldwin ministry introduced the Rebellion Losses Bill. The purpose of the bill was to compensate residents of Canada East who had suffered property losses during the Rebellions of 1837 and 1838. A similar bill had already been passed to compensate individuals in Upper Canada for their losses in the rebellion.

The Rebellion Losses Bill was highly controversial. The Tory opposition attacked the bill and the government, arguing that the bill would compensate those who had taken up arms against the Crown. They called on the Governor General, Lord Elgin, to deny royal assent to the bill. When Lord Elgin instead gave royal assent, on the advice of the LaFontaine–Baldwin ministry, the Tories rioted. On the night of April 25, 1849, while the Legislative Assembly was in session, the rioters set fire to the Parliament Building, which burnt to the ground. There was no loss of life, but the Library of Parliament, containing many historical records and texts, was destroyed.

=== Itinerant Parliament: Toronto and Quebec (1850–1865) ===
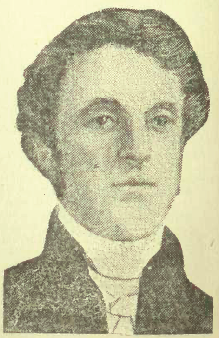
Henry Sherwood, who proposed that the Parliament should alternate between Toronto and Quebec

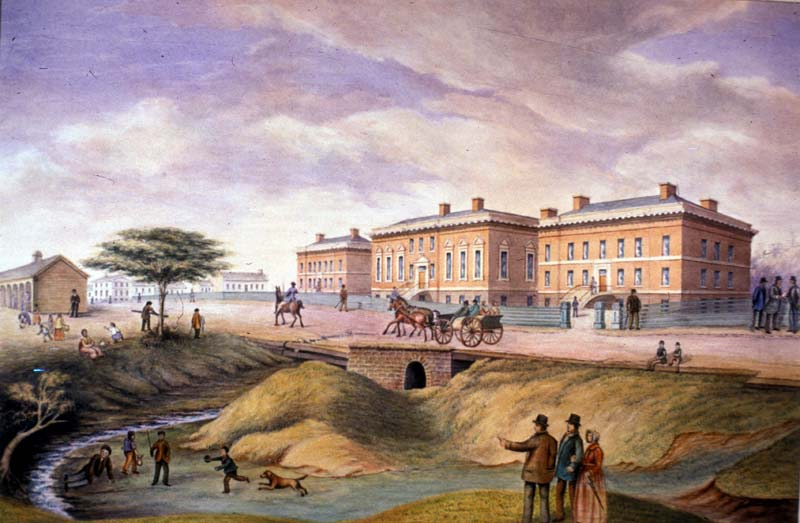
Upper Canada Parliament Buildings in Toronto, used from 1850 to 1851, and from 1855 to 1859

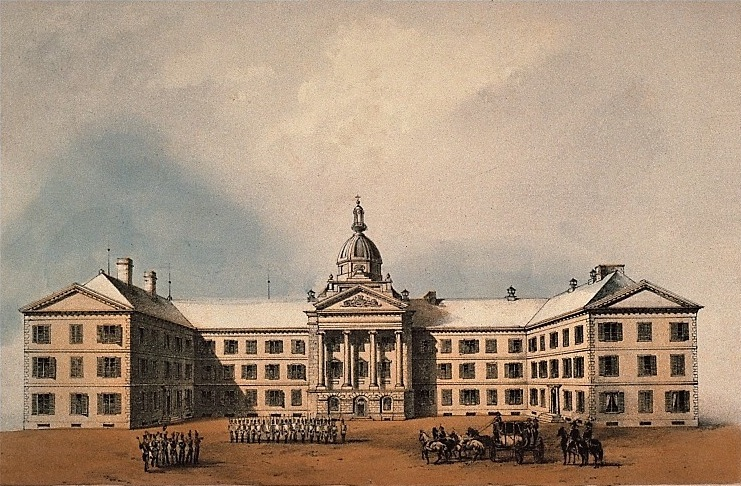
Old Parliament Building in Quebec, used from 1860 to 1866

Following the burning of the Parliament building, the members of Parliament reconvened at Bonsecours Market in Montreal. Henry Sherwood, one of the members for Toronto, introduced a resolution calling on the governor to summon the Parliament alternately at Toronto and Quebec. He suggested that the time in one city would not be more than four years, and then Parliament would move to the other city.

In the debate on the resolution, other cities were proposed. Henry Sherwood's brother, George Sherwood, member for Brockville, proposed that one central city be chosen as the permanent seat of government, but without specifying the city. John A. Macdonald, member for Kingston, proposed that the seat of government return to Kingston on a permanent basis. George Lyon, member for Russell in the Ottawa area, proposed that Ottawa (then still called Bytown) be the seat of government.

These alternatives were rejected and on May 19, 1849, the Assembly adopted Henry Sherwood's resolution, by a vote of 34 to 29. The members of the government were divided on the issue, including the two joint premiers. Baldwin, the member for York North near Toronto, voted in favour of the resolution, while LaFontaine, one of the members for Montreal, voted against it. Other Cabinet members similarly voted based on their regional interests. Parliament was then prorogued on May 30, 1849, ending the legislative session. In November 1849, Governor General Elgin announced that Parliament would next meet in Toronto. The third and fourth sessions of the third Parliament were held in Toronto in 1850 and 1851.

Following the 1851 session, the governor general summoned Parliament to meet at Quebec, as proposed in Sherwood's resolution. The fourth Parliament, elected in December 1851, met in Quebec from 1852 to 1854. Following the general elections of 1854, the first and second sessions of the fifth Parliament also met in Quebec, in 1854 and 1855. In October 1855, the governor general issued a proclamation summoning Parliament back to Toronto. After the 1859 session, the governor general issued a proclamation returning the Parliament to Quebec.

== Drawbacks to the itinerant Parliament ==
There were serious drawbacks to the itinerant Parliament. Each time it moved, the regional debates about the seat of government were revived. Sometimes parliamentary records were lost in the relocations, hampering the legislative process.

It was also expensive to relocate the seat of government every few years. Both the Parliament and the governmental departments had to move. For example, the cost to move from Quebec to Toronto in 1855 was £14,510. (Note: Both Canadian pounds sterling and Canadian dollars were used as currency at this time in the Province of Canada. Some sources refer to values in sterling, some to values in dollars. References to currency amounts in this article track the currency mentioned in cited sources.) (Note: £14,510 was equivalent to $70,614 at the statutory conversion rate then in use.) This included the relocation costs for the public servants who worked in the provincial government, with a base allowance of £56 for a family of eight, which would be pro rated by the size of each family. (Note: £56 was equivalent to $273 at the statutory conversion rate then in use.) In 1859, the Globe newspaper estimated that the move from Toronto to Quebec would cost $2,000,000.

There was also the travel issue. Quebec was at one end of the province, Toronto close to the other end. Prior to the development of the railways, the locations in Quebec and Toronto required lengthy travels by the members of Parliament from the other parts of the province.

By 1856, the seat of government issue was becoming a major political dispute in Parliament. Overall, it is estimated that there were more than 200 parliamentary votes on the issue from 1841 to the final vote in 1860.

== Ottawa is chosen ==
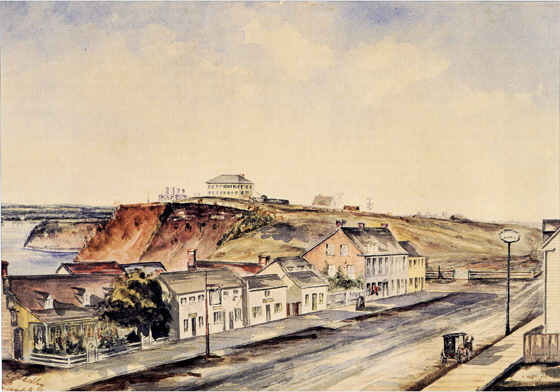
Bytown (now Ottawa) in 1853, showing the future site of the Parliament of Canada on what is now Parliament Hill

=== Repeated debates in the Legislative Assembly, 1856–1857 ===
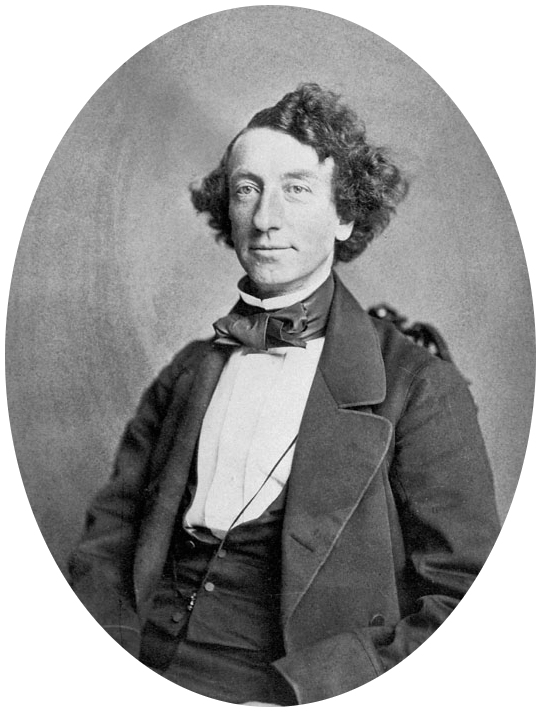
John A. Macdonald, who proposed asking the Queen

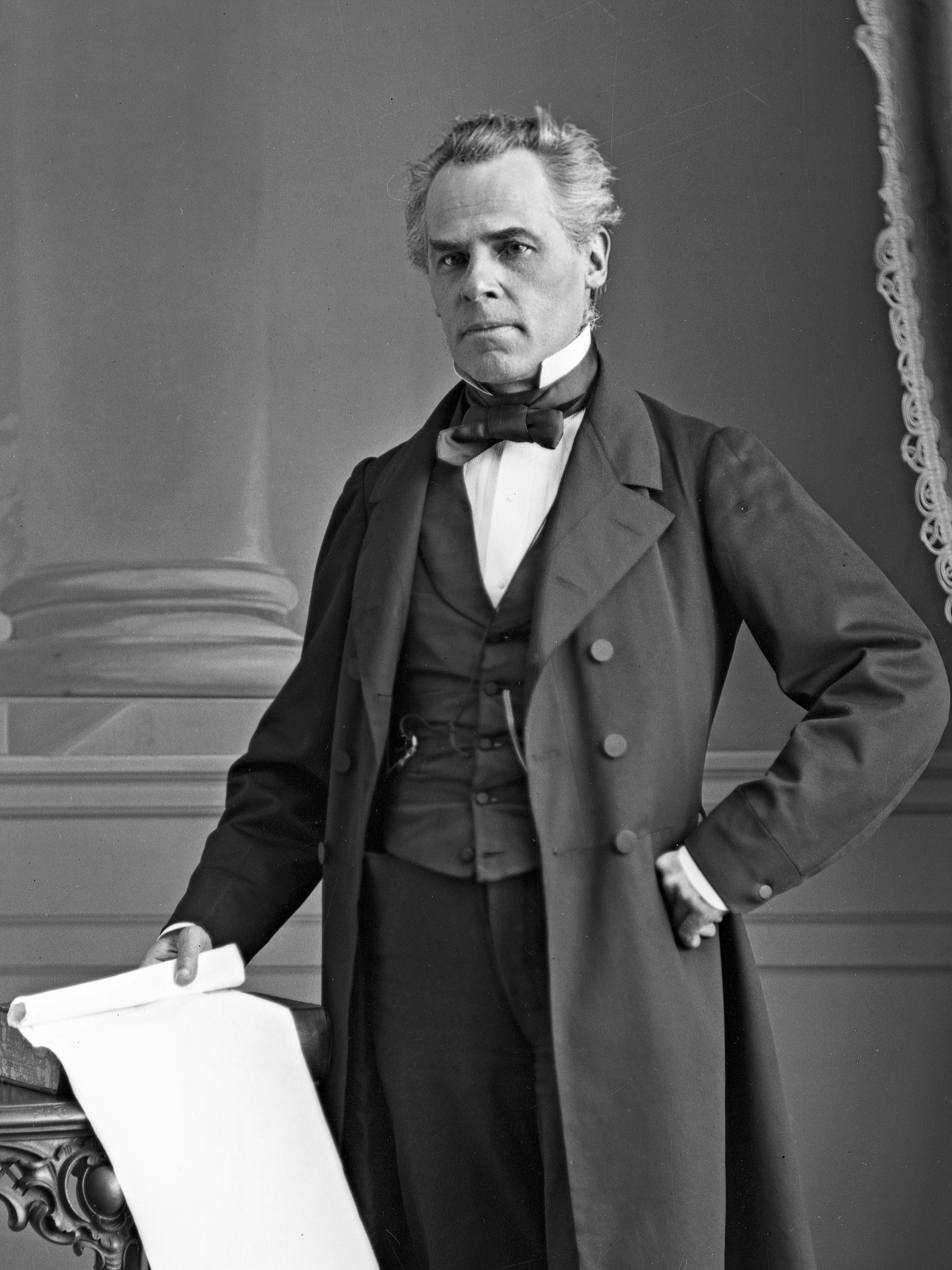
George-Étienne Cartier, who also proposed asking the Queen

In 1856, the issue came up again in the Legislative Assembly, which passed a motion that Quebec would be the seat of government on a permanent basis. However, after the passage of that motion, a non-confidence motion linked to the seat-of-government issue was introduced. Although the motion was defeated, it resulted in a restructuring of the government, with John A. Macdonald becoming the co-premier from Canada West. The initial motion choosing Quebec was not rescinded, but the Legislative Council rejected the proposed budget for the construction of new buildings, leaving the matter hanging.

The matter came up again the next year, in 1857. Macdonald, now the undisputed leader of the Liberal-Conservatives from Canada West, and George-Étienne Cartier, the leader of the conservative Bleus from Canada East, were convinced that the issue of the seat of government had to be removed from Canadian politics to keep the Province of Canada together, so divisive were the regional loyalties. Their own Cabinet was divided on the issue, as Macdonald admitted in the Legislative Assembly.

Several votes were held during the 1857 spring session of the Canadian Parliament. Each of the previous cities was proposed in turn, but none carried a majority. Ottawa was proposed as a possible compromise, but the members continued to vote for their regional cities. Cartier, for example, personally favoured Ottawa as a compromise location, but as a member from Montreal, publicly supported Montreal. There was strong opposition in Canada West for the proposal that Quebec be the seat of government. As the motions went on, there was even a proposal to determine the seat of government by drawing lots.

=== Decision referred to Queen Victoria, 1857 ===
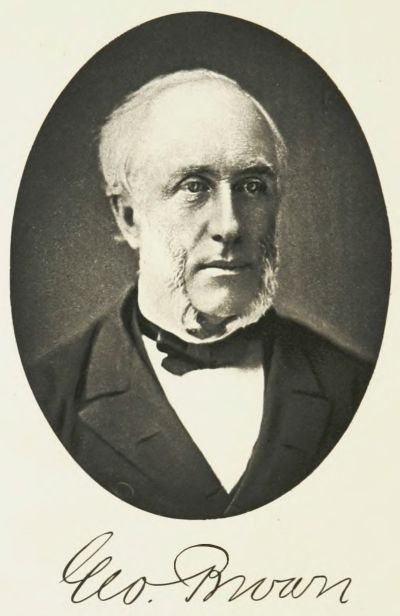
George Brown, Reform leader, who criticised the government's referral to the Queen as an abdication of responsible government

The government eventually settled on a means to resolve the impasse, by referring the matter to Queen Victoria. The suggestion may have come from Governor General Sir Edmund Head, or it may have been Macdonald's idea: the Legislative Assembly would petition the Queen to determine the location of the seat of government.

Whatever the source of the idea, Macdonald and Cartier introduced three resolutions in the Assembly:

- that the interests of Canada required that the seat of government be located at a fixed place, which passed the Assembly unanimously;
- that Parliament should commit not more than £225,000 (Note: £225,000 was equivalent to $1,094,985 at the statutory conversion rate then in use.) for the construction of parliament buildings at that fixed place, which passed with a majority of sixteen; and
- that the Queen be asked to determine the location of the seat of government, which passed with a majority of eleven.

The resolutions were then combined into an Address to the Queen, which also passed the Legislative Assembly with a majority of eleven, on a vote of 61 to 50.

The Globe newspaper in Toronto, published by one of the leading Reform party members, George Brown, condemned the decision, saying that it amounted to a vote "to destroy responsible government by sending to Downing Street for Mr Labouchere [the Colonial Secretary] to fix the seat of government." For a short time, however, the resolutions removed the seat of government issue from Canadian politics.

=== The Governor General's memorandum to the Colonial Secretary ===
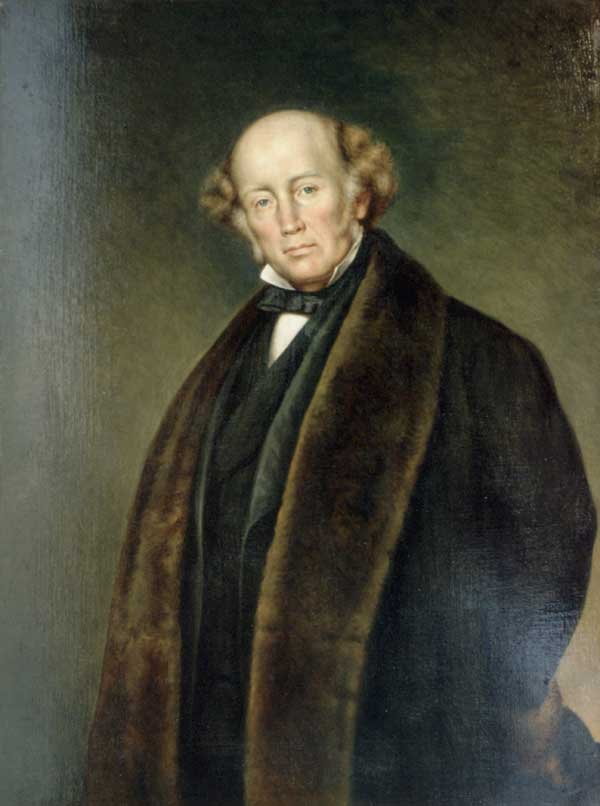
Governor General Sir Edmund Head, who wrote an influential memorandum on the issue

Folklore has given a couple of simple stories about how the Queen chose Ottawa. One story is that she put her finger at random on a map, landing on Ottawa. (Note: A variant is that she threw a dart at a map.) Another version is that she was entranced by a sketch of the cliffs of Ottawa prepared by Lady Head, the wife of the governor general. Neither is correct. The historic account is more complicated, involving a detailed review and memorandum prepared by Governor General Head for the assistance of the British government, along with his personal recommendation for Ottawa as the seat of government.

Governor General Head personally favoured Ottawa as a compromise candidate. However, following the passage of the resolutions by the Assembly, he sent a circular to the mayors of each of the five cities under consideration, asking them to discuss the issue in their municipalities and to send him their opinions.

Following those consultations, Head wrote a confidential memorandum to the Colonial Secretary, Henry Labouchere, urging that Ottawa be chosen. In his memorandum, Head explained that there was a great deal of regional jealousy between Canada West and Canada East, so choosing any of the four cities which had already served as seat of government would likely be unpopular. Ottawa, however, was located in Canada West, but on the Ottawa River, which was the boundary with Canada East. Its location in Canada West would make it an acceptable second choice for Toronto, while it had considerable economic ties to Montreal, making it an acceptable second choice for that city.

Head also noted that Quebec was at one end of the Province of Canada, while Toronto was close to the other end. Choosing either one would require much travel by the members of the Parliament, while Ottawa's central position would be advantageous. Head also cited defence concerns: Toronto, Kingston and Montreal were all vulnerable to attack from the United States. Ottawa's interior location, with good water communications with both Montreal and Kingston, made it a more defensible location.

=== The Queen chooses Ottawa, 1857 ===
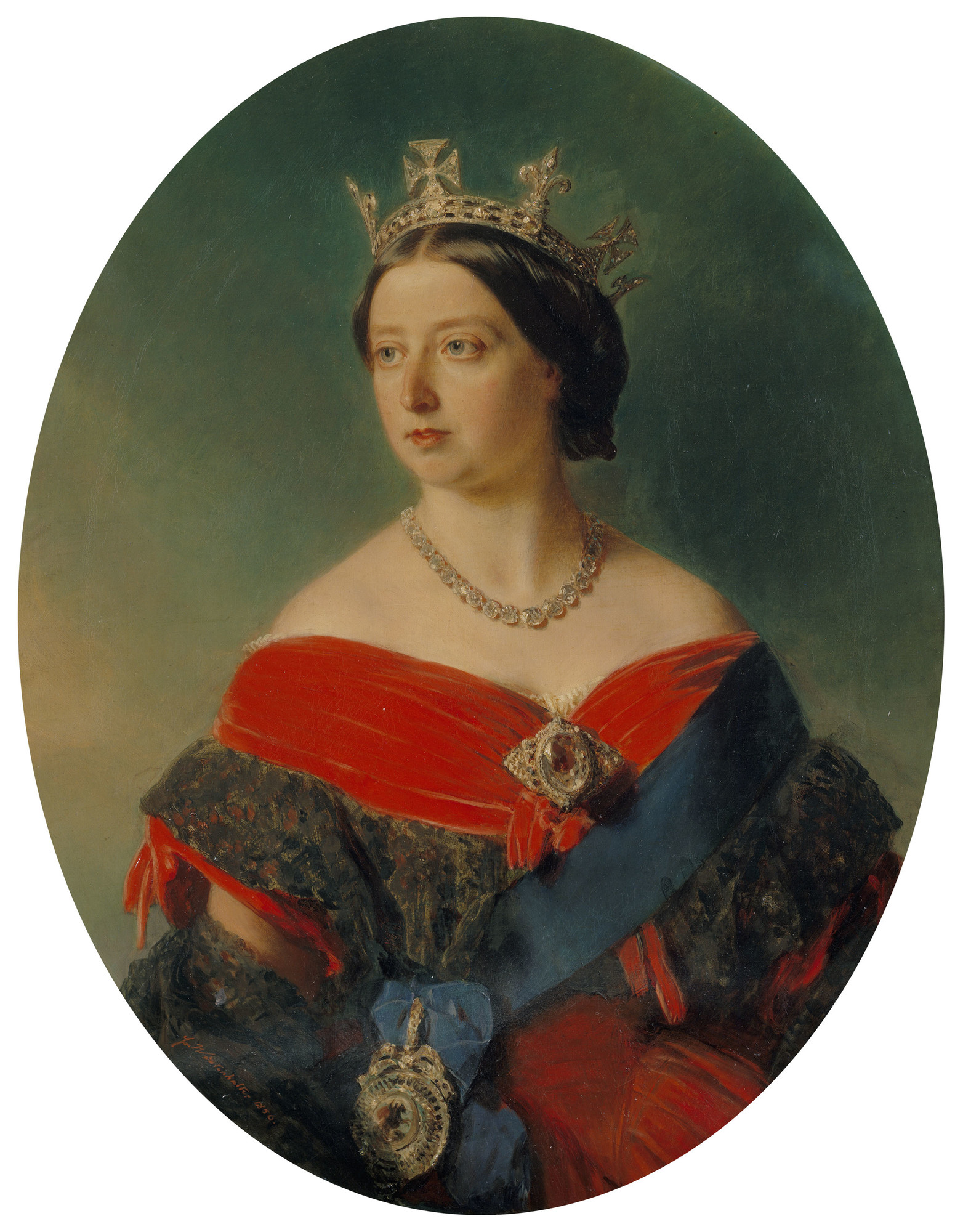
Queen Victoria, who chose Ottawa as the capital

Head then went to London to explain his recommendation to the British government. The Colonial Secretary agreed with Head's position and recommended Ottawa to Queen Victoria. The Prince Consort, Prince Albert, also favoured Ottawa. Late in 1857, the Queen decided in favour of Ottawa. Labouchere formally advised Head of that decision by a dispatch dated December 31, 1857. Governor General Head announced it publicly in February 1858.

=== Fall of the Canadian government, 1858 ===
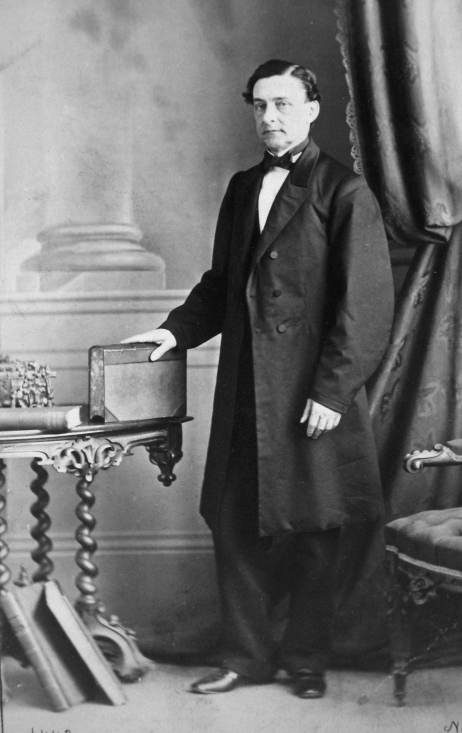
Antoine-Aimé Dorion, who introduced a motion regretting the Queen's choice of Ottawa

That was not the end of the matter. The issue remained volatile, to the point that the Macdonald–Cartier government fell in the parliamentary session of 1858 over the choice of the seat of government. Opposition to the choice of Ottawa came from the Reformers of Canada West, led by Brown, and from members of the Parti Rouge from Canada East. There was also opposition from some of the Bleus, who normally supported the government.

When the Macdonald–Cartier government introduced a motion to approve the construction of new parliament buildings in Ottawa, the main leader of the Rouges, Antoine-Aimé Dorion, introduced an amendment on July 16, 1858, stating that the Assembly "deeply regrets" that Ottawa had been chosen. That amendment was defeated, but two weeks later, on July 28, Christopher Dunkin, an independent member from Canada East, moved an address to the Queen asking that she reconsider her decision, and make Montreal the seat of government. A Rouge member, Eugène-Urgel Piché, moved an amendment to the Dunkin motion, completely rejecting the choice of Ottawa. That amendment passed (64–50), with support from the Rouge members, most of the Reformers from Canada West, and some Bleus from Canada East.

During the debate, Macdonald stated that he viewed the rejection as "a brusque and uncourteous insult to Her Majesty". The Macdonald–Cartier government treated the vote as a confidence matter, and resigned the next day, July 29. Brown and Dorion then formed a government, but due to political manoeuvering, MacDonald and Cartier were able to return to office a week later in the Double Shuffle, as the Cartier–Macdonald ministry. The issue of the seat of government was left untouched for the rest of the parliamentary session.

=== Ottawa confirmed as seat of government ===
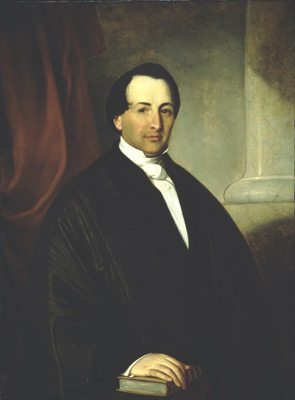
Louis-Victor Sicotte, who resigned from Cabinet in 1859 over the proposal to make Ottawa the seat of government

The next year, in 1859, the Cartier–Macdonald ministry reintroduced the motion for funding the construction of new parliament buildings in Ottawa, making it a party vote for the first time. This time, the motion eventually passed, although one of the leading Cabinet ministers from Canada East, Louis-Victor Sicotte, resigned in protest.

Sicotte then proposed an amendment to the address in reply to the Throne speech, reiterating that at the 1858 session, the Legislative Assembly had passed the motion stating that Ottawa should not be the seat of government. A lengthy, bitter debate arose on the issue, lasting a fortnight, but in the end the Assembly approved the choice of Ottawa and voted the necessary funds, by a five-vote margin (64–59). Subsequent motions to reject the proposal of Ottawa were rejected by larger margins. Unlike the previous year, Cartier was now largely in control of the Bleus, even though fifteen broke ranks and voted for Sicotte's motion.

The government's motion provided that while the new parliament buildings were being built in Ottawa, the Parliament would move one last time from Toronto to Quebec, where it would meet until the final relocation to Ottawa. Brown vigorously opposed the proposal; his Globe newspaper called it a waste of two million dollars to placate Quebec for the loss of the seat of government.

The next year, in the 1860 legislative session, there was one last opposition challenge to Ottawa as seat of government, with Piché introducing a motion to defer moving the seat of government until there had been an election on the issue of union of all the British North American provinces. This time the motion was soundly defeated (88–24), with all the members from Canada West voting in favour of Ottawa. The issue was finally settled.

On October 20, 1865, the Administrator of the government, Lieutenant General Sir John Michel, acting on behalf of the Governor General, issued a proclamation announcing that the Parliament would next meet in Ottawa.

== Construction of the Parliament Buildings ==
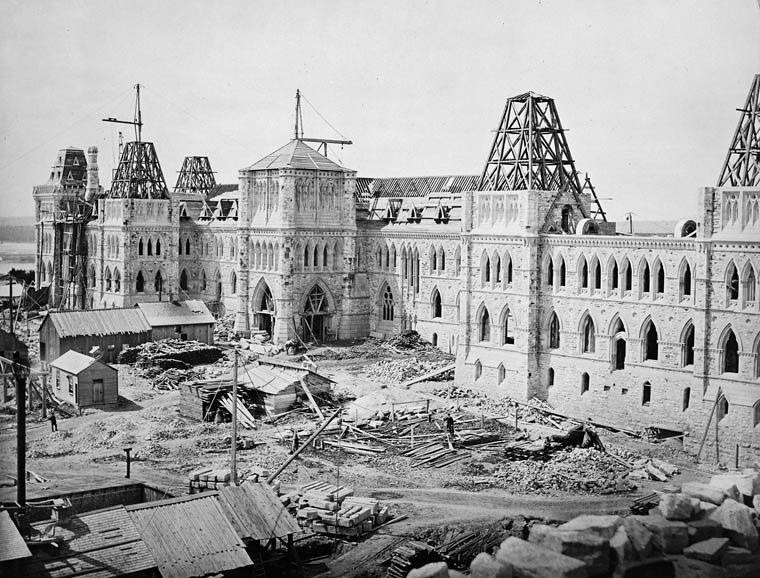
Centre Block of the Parliament Buildings under construction, 1863

Construction of the new Parliament Buildings began in 1860. Progress was initially fast, but the construction was temporarily halted in 1862 because of large cost overruns. A royal commission of inquiry was held, which found various faults with the construction process, notably that the bedrock was much deeper than originally estimated, requiring greater foundation work. The architectural firm also came in for criticism for failing to supervise the work. The commission of inquiry nonetheless recommended that the original architects and builders be allowed to continue the project. By the time the buildings were completed, the total cost was at least $2,591,760, more than double the original budget of £225,000 (equivalent to $1,094,985). Another estimate is that the total cost was three times the original budget.

== Seat of government moves to Ottawa – 1866 ==
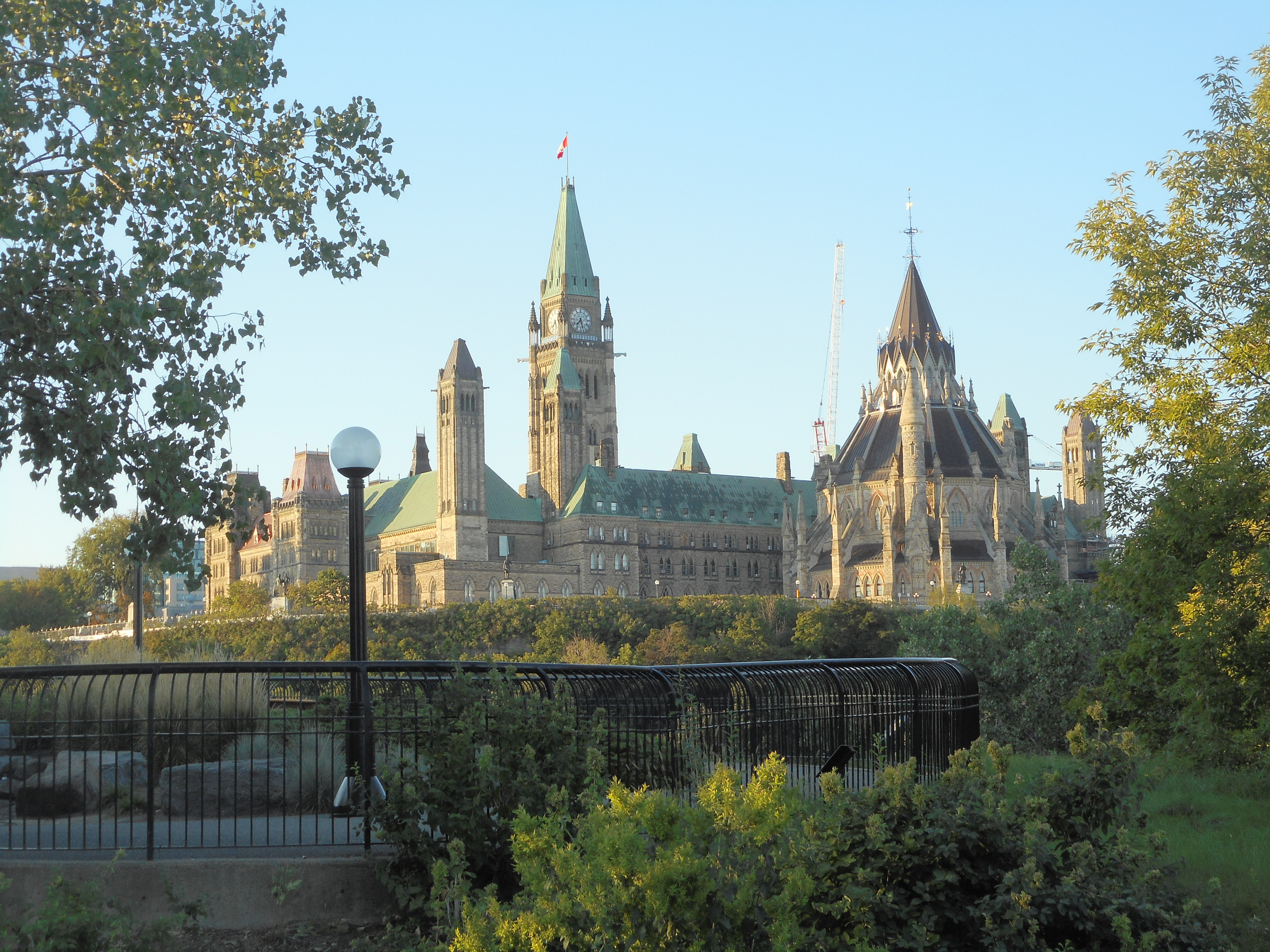
The Parliament Buildings today: the East Block, the Peace Tower, and the Library of Parliament

By 1865, the buildings were near completion, and the seat of government relocated for the sixth and final time. The last session of the Parliament of the Province of Canada was held in the new buildings in Ottawa in 1866.

In 1867, Canada was created as a federation of Ontario, Quebec, Nova Scotia and New Brunswick, and Ottawa became the seat of government for the new country. The Parliament of Canada held its first session in the Parliament Buildings in November 1867.

== Location of parliamentary sessions: 1841 to 1866 ==
From 1841 to 1866, the seat of government moved six times, to five different cities. Originally located in Kingston, it moved to Montreal, Toronto (twice), Quebec (twice), and finally Ottawa.

Location	Dates	Parliamentary sessions
Kingston	1841 to 1843	1st Parliament: 1st, 2nd and 3rd sessions
Montreal	1844 to 1849	2nd Parliament: 1st, 2nd and 3rd sessions 3rd Parliament: 1st and 2nd sessions
Toronto	1850 to 1851	3rd Parliament: 3rd and 4th sessions
Quebec	1852 to 1854	4th Parliament: 1st session (parts 1 and 2) and 2nd session 5th Parliament: 1st session (parts 1 and 2)
Toronto	1855 to 1859	5th Parliament: 2nd and 3rd sessions 6th Parliament: 1st session (parts 1 and 2) and 2nd session
Quebec	1860 to 1865	6th Parliament: 3rd and 4th sessions 7th Parliament: 1st and 2nd sessions 8th Parliament: 1st, 2nd, 3rd, and 4th sessions
Ottawa	1866	8th Parliament: 5th session
Source: Journals of the Legislative Assembly of the Province of Canada

== See also ==
- Capital of New Zealand
