= Alexander Roberts Dunn =

First Canadian recipient of the Victoria Cross

Alexander Roberts Dunn VC
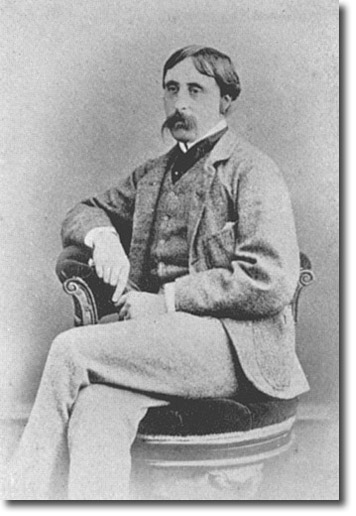
- Born: 15 September 1833; York, Upper Canada
- Died: 25 January 1868 (aged 34); Senafe, Abyssinia
- Burial place: Senafe, Eritrea
- Relatives: John Henry Dunn (father)
- Military career
- Allegiance: British Empire
- Branch: British Army
- Service years: 1852–1856; 1858–1868
- Rank: Colonel
- Units: 11th Hussars (Prince Albert's Own) ("the Cherry Pickers"); 100th (Prince of Wales's Royal Canadian) Regiment of Foot; 33rd (Duke of Wellington's) Regiment of Foot
- Commands: 33rd Regiment of Foot
- Conflicts: Crimean War: Battle of the Alma, siege of Sevastopol, Battle of Balaclava, Battle of Inkermann, British Expedition to Abyssinia
- Awards: Victoria Cross; Crimea Medal (four clasps); Turkish Crimea Medal

Alexander Roberts Dunn VC (15 September 1833 – 25 January 1868) was the first Canadian awarded the Victoria Cross, the highest and most prestigious award for bravery in the face of the enemy that can be awarded to British and Commonwealth forces. Later in life, he assisted in raising a regiment in Canada for the British Army. He was the first Canadian to command a British Army regiment.

Dunn died of a gunshot wound under mysterious circumstances in Abyssinia (now Eritrea), where he was part of the British Expedition to Abyssinia. His grave was re-discovered by Canadian Armed Forces troops who were part of the United Nations peacekeeping force to the Eritrean–Ethiopian War of 2000-2001.

== Family and early life ==
Dunn was born in York, Upper Canada (later Toronto, Ontario) in 1833, the son of John Henry Dunn, Receiver General of Upper Canada, and Charlotte Roberts. Charlotte Roberts died in 1835 when Dunn was 2 and John Dunn remarried in 1842 to Sophia Louisa Juchereau Duchesnay. Dunn studied at Upper Canada College until his family was forced to move to England in 1845 after John Dunn's political downfall. In England the Dunns lived in the St. George Hanover Square parish and Alexander Dunn attended Harrow School from 1848 to 1851. On March 12, 1852 at the age of 18, he purchased a commission in a cavalry regiment in the British Army, the 11th Hussars (Prince Albert’s Own). Dunn was six feet, three inches tall, and commissioned a special four foot long sabre from Wilkinson Sword to accommodate his height.

== Crimean War, Charge of the Light Brigade and the Victoria Cross ==
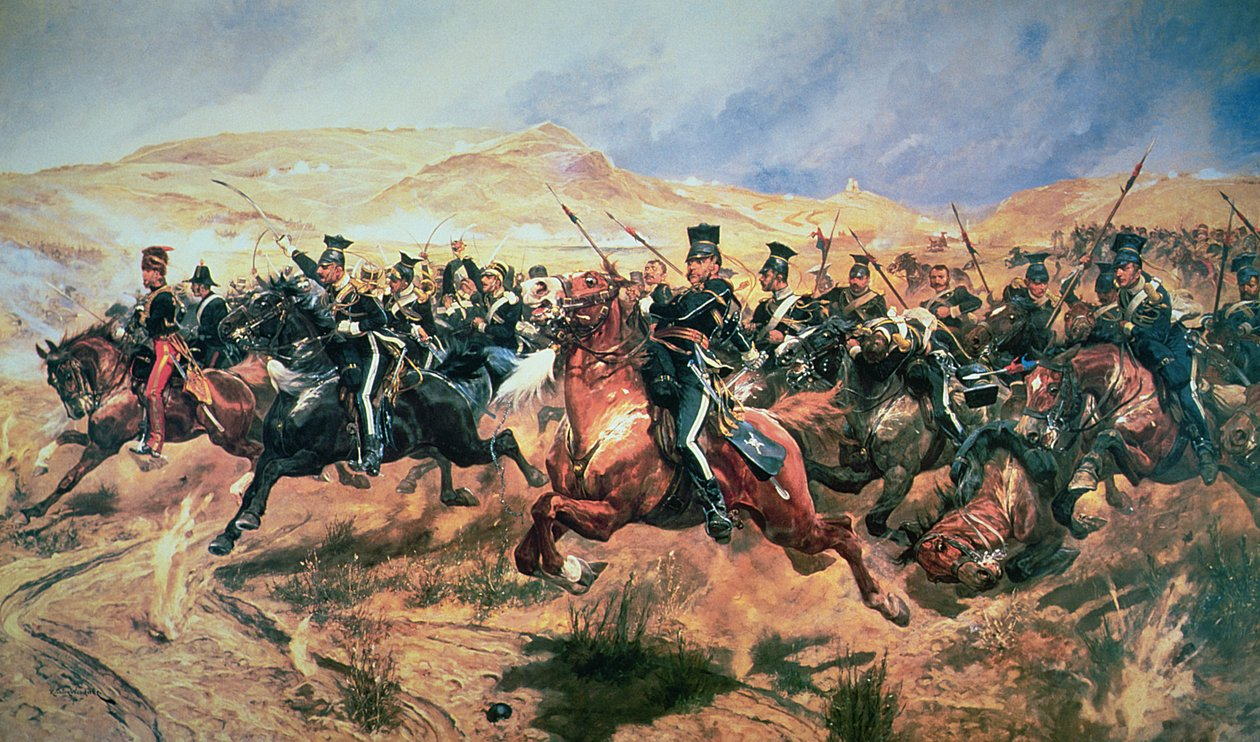
Charge of the Light Brigade, Balaclava, 25 October 1854 (Richard Caton Woodville Jr., 1894)

Dunn served in the Crimean War where he first saw combat at the Battle of Alma when the Light Brigade took part in the initial skirmish at the beginning of the battle. For the remainder of the battle the Light Brigade guarded the inland flank.

Dunn was awarded the Victoria Cross for his actions at the Charge of the Light Brigade during the Battle of Balaclava on 25 October 1854, when he was 21 years of age.

Lieutenant Dunn was actively engaged in the battle, leading his troops in the futile attempts to capture the Russian artillery. When the retreat was finally called, he saw that one of his troopers, Sergeant Robert Bentley, was in trouble. Bentley's horse was badly wounded. Russian lancers had picked Bentley out as a straggler and were attacking him, trying to knock him out of the saddle. Dunn wheeled his horse and returned to Bentley's aid. He killed two or three of the Russian soldiers, lifted Bentley back up on his horse, and slapped its rear to get it moving back to safety. Dunn then noticed that another soldier from his troop, Private Harvey Levett, had been dismounted and was being attacked by a Russian hussar. Dunn came to Levett's aid, killing the Russian hussar with his lengthy sabre. Bentley survived the battle, however Levett was killed minutes after Dunn's action.

When he was finally back to safety, Dunn found that only 25 had survived from his troop of 110 cavalrymen. Dunn broke down and cried.

The last Crimean War battle that Dunn took part in was the Battle of Inkerman where the 11th Hussars were held in reserve, though came under fire from Russian cannon, and assisted the wounded coming from the battle.

Queen Victoria instituted the Victoria Cross in 1856, for conspicuous acts of bravery by any member of the British military. The award was available for events from 1854 onwards, to include acts of bravery during the Crimean War, which began in late 1853. After the war, it was announced that the 11th Hussars could nominate a soldier to receive the Victoria Cross for his bravery. Dunn was the unanimous choice of the regiment. His name was on the list of the first group of recipients of the Victoria Cross, announced in February 1857.

On 26 June 1857, Queen Victoria presented the first sixty-two Victoria Crosses at an awards ceremony in Hyde Park, in front of a crowd of 100,000. Although Dunn by that time had left the 11th Hussars, he was amongst that group of the first recipients, being the 17th in line.

== Later military career ==
Dunn sold his commission at the end of the Crimean War, having conducted an affair with the wife of a fellow officer. She left her husband for Dunn. He returned to Canada in 1856, where he initially ran his family's estate, north of Toronto, and joined a local Masonic lodge.

In May 1857, the Indian Mutiny began. Dunn assisted in raising a regiment in Canada for the British Army, the 100th (Prince of Wales's Royal Canadian) Regiment of Foot, which he joined with the rank of major. In 1858, when the 100th Regiment was leaving for Britain, Dunn was presented with a sword which had been recently found on the Plains of Abraham, and was thought to have belonged to General Wolfe. After arriving in Britain, the 100th Regiment was sent to Gibraltar to act as garrison troops.

Dunn exchanged into the 33rd Regiment of Foot in 1864, as a lieutenant-colonel. He was promoted to the rank of colonel in 1866, the youngest colonel in the British Army. At the start of the British Expedition to Abyssinia in 1868, he was given the command of the 33rd Regiment, the first Canadian to command a British regiment, but was killed in unusual circumstances during a hunting accident at Senafe before the military part of the campaign started.

== Death ==
The accounts of Dunn's death vary. It occurred at the town of Senafe in Abyssinia (now Eritrea). The official version from the 33rd Regiment is that Dunn was holding his rifle and trying to uncork a brandy flask, when the rifle slipped between his legs and discharged into his chest. He told his servant to run for a doctor, but by the time help arrived, Dunn was dead. However, another version is that Dunn dismounted from his horse and sent his servant to get water for the horse. When the servant returned, Dunn was found dead, possibly a suicide. Still other rumours circulated, possibly of murder.

== Dunn's grave ==
Dunn was buried in a local cemetery in Senafe. The location was eventually forgotten, until the end of World War II. A British soldier, leading a patrol of Eritrean Mounted Police, came across a grown-over cemetery, but found that one gravesite had been cleaned and tended recently. It was Dunn's grave. Soldiers of the occupying Italian forces had tended the grave, even though they were at war with the Canadian and British armies. The British sent a report to London, but it appears to have been lost for some decades.

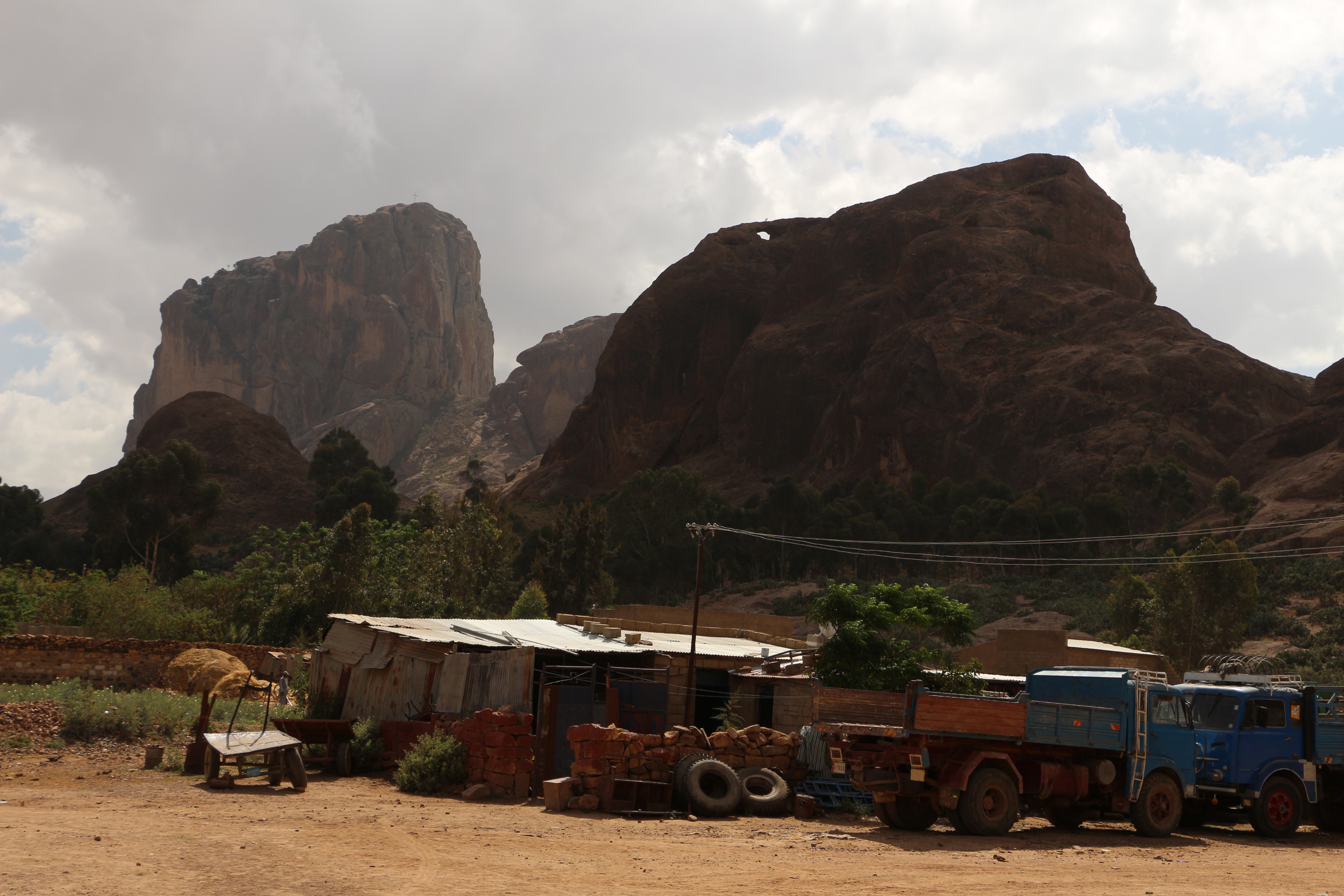
Modern-day Senafe

Half a century later, the grave was re-discovered by Canadian peacekeeping soldiers, from 2nd Battalion, The Royal Canadian Regiment, who were part of the United Nations Mission in Ethiopia and Eritrea during the Eritrean–Ethiopian War of 1998–2000. Ben Mitchell of the Canadian Armed Forces gave his account of the re-discovery:

We had just advanced from our rear camp in Dekemhare into Senafe. We had crossed both trench lines in Senafe and their mine fields. Tensions were very high for not only the Eritrea and Ethiopian armies but for us as well. There was still military forces in the area, whom were not supposed to be there. We knew our task of getting the militaries to withdraw would be tuff. We set up camp in the school yard at the base of that amazing cliff. My Lieutenant and I left the camp right away to search for a well in the city and this is when it first happened. The children in the city gathered around us and said "Canada" while pulling our hands to lead us somewhere. Now there was no way we were going anywhere with these kids. This thing smelled of an ambush badly. How did they know the word "Canada" and why were they so eager to lead us away? The two of us then returned to the schoolyard and reported this unusual event to Headquarters (HQ). 2 weeks went by and each patrol that entered the city had the same experience with the kids. Each time they would report it to HQ and say they did not follow the children. Finally HQ got tired of hearing about these children and orders us to investigate. Now this is when it gets embarrassing for us. We geared up to follow these kids like we were entering an ambush...we were ready for anything that may happen. We had over 300 rounds of ammunition per soldier, flak jackets, radios, machine guns. We were not going to be caught off guard. When we entered the city, the same routine happened with the kids, but this time we let them lead us. Weapons on our shoulders we walked through the city slowly waiting for something to happen. I remember how hot it was that day and how much I was sweating. Finally we got to a cemetery on the outskirts of the city and the kids started pointing at this tombstone. We looked at the name "COL DUNN". When we got back to camp we radioed in what had happened. HQ sent a report back to Canada asking them to figure out who this DUNN was. A week later we found out. The kids had led us to the grave of a Canadian war hero R. Dunn, one of the first winners of the Victoria Cross. The highest order of merit issues in the Canadian Forces. This man was a legend. He had gone on safari Africa in 1860s and never returned. He was a Canadian hero who had been lost for over a hundred years. These kids whom we thought were leading us into an ambush had done Canada a great service and located Colonel R. Dunn Victoria Cross. If those kids were not as persistent as they were we would never have followed them and we would have never found Colonel Dunn.

— Ben Mitchell

After the re-discovery of the grave, a group of 4 Engineering Support Regiment engineers from CFB Gagetown repaired it in 2001.

== Legacy ==
In addition to the Victoria Cross, Dunn was also awarded the British Crimea Medal with four clasps, for the Battle of the Alma (1854), the Battle of Balaclava (1854), the Battle of Inkermann (1854), and the siege of Sevastopol (1854–1855). He also received the Turkish Crimean War Medal, and the British Abyssinian War Medal.

Dunn's medals came on sale at Sotheby's in 1894. The federal government authorised Sir Charles Tupper, the Canadian High Commissioner to Britain, to buy the medals. They were brought to Canada and eventually placed on display in the main foyer of his old school, Upper Canada College, in Toronto. In 1977, due to a number of recent thefts and losses of Victoria Cross medals, the school replaced the Victoria Cross with a copy and moved the original to their bank safe deposit box. In 2006, Upper Canada College placed the medals on loan to the Canadian War Museum in Ottawa.

In 1894, one of Dunn's fellow-officers from the 100th Royal Canadian Regiment of Foot sent three souvenirs back to Canada, including Dunn's camp-stool from the Crimea. The camp-stool and Dunn's sword are now also on display at the Canadian War Museum.

The City of Ottawa, assisted by Royal Canadian Legion Branch 638 (Kanata), created Alexander Dunn Park, dedicated to Dunn's memory. The park is located on Bellrock Drive in Ottawa.

There is a memorial plaque dedicated to Dunn at Clarence Square in Toronto, near where Dunn was born.
