= Toronto (Province of Canada electoral district) =

Province of Canada electoral district

Upper Canada electoral district

Defunct pre-Confederation electoral district
- Legislature: Legislative Assembly of Upper Canada
- District created: 1834
- District abolished: 1841
- First contested: 1834
- Last contested: 1836

Toronto
Province of Canada electoral district

Defunct pre-Confederation electoral district
- Legislature: Legislative Assembly of the Province of Canada
- District created: 1841
- District abolished: 1861
- First contested: 1841
- Last contested: 1857

Toronto
Ontario electoral district

Defunct provincial electoral district
- Legislature: Legislative Assembly of Ontario
- District created: 1886
- District abolished: 1894
- First contested: 1886
- Last contested: 1890

Toronto as an electoral division was represented in various legislatures that existed in the nineteenth century and twentieth century. It was first created 1834 as an electoral division of the House of Assembly in the 12th Parliament of Upper Canada. Upon the establishment of the Province of Canada in 1841 by the union of Upper Canada and Lower Canada, it continued as a constituency in the Legislative Assembly from the 1st Parliament until the dissolution of the 6th Parliament of the Province of Canada in 1861.

In 1861, it was divided into two separate electoral districts, West Toronto and East Toronto, along Yonge Street. Those two electoral districts continued to function in the first Canadian federal election and the first Ontario provincial election, held concurrently in 1867.

After confederation, Toronto re-emerged briefly as an Ontario provincial electoral district in the 6th and 7th Parliament of Ontario between 1886 and 1894, returning three members.

== Boundaries ==
Following the City of Toronto's incorporation in 1834, the electoral district of Toronto was established and succeeded the electoral district of the Town of York. Its boundaries follows the municipal boundaries of Old Toronto, as they existed at the time.

The Union Act, 1840 had merged the two provinces of Upper Canada and Lower Canada into the Province of Canada, with a single Parliament. The separate parliaments of Lower Canada and Upper Canada were abolished. The Union Act provided that the city of Toronto would constitute one electoral district in the Legislative Assembly of the new Parliament, and increase its representation to two members. The Act gave the Governor General of the Province of Canada the power to draw the boundaries for the electoral district. The first Governor General, Lord Sydenham, issued a proclamation shortly after the formation of the Province of Canada in early 1841, establishing the boundaries for the electoral district. The boundaries were based largely on the municipal boundaries of Toronto as it existed in 1841.

== Members of the Legislative Assembly ==
Toronto was initially established as the Town of York in Upper Canada in 1793. In its early years, it was represented in the Legislative Assembly of Upper Canada as part of York County, and its members represented multiple counties. In 1821, York and Kingston became the first two towns in Upper Canada to gain representation in the 8th Parliament of Upper Canada. John Beverley Robinson, later the de facto leader of the oligarchic Family Compact, was York's first elected member, holding the seat in the 8th, 9th, and the first year of the 10th Parliament of Upper Canada, until he was appointed Chief Justice of the colony. Robinson held the role of Attorney General during that time and was effective the government's leader in the assembly. His son, also named John Beverley Robinson, born in the first month after the senior Robinson took his seat, would later held a portion of the seat as the member for Toronto West in the Legislative Assembly of the Province of Canada.

Robinson was succeeded as York's representative in 1829 by Robert Baldwin, later the leader of the Reform Party and led the first responsible government ministry in the Province of Canada in 1929. Baldwin was however defeated by Samuel Peters Jarvis, an administration supporter, in the general election the following year and was out of politics for a number of years.

York was incorporated as Toronto in 1834, and was renamed accordingly. Upon Upper Canada's union with Lower Canada, Toronto was represented by two members in the Legislative Assembly of the Province of Canada.

Parliament	Years	Members	Affiliation	Members	Affiliation
Legislative Assembly of Upper Canada
Parliamentary term		York (town)			
8th	1821–1824	John Beverley Robinson	Family Compact		
9th	1825–1828	John Beverley Robinson	Family Compact		
10th	1828–1829	John Beverley Robinson	Family Compact		
10th	1829–1830	Robert Baldwin	Reformer		
11th	1831–1834	Samuel Peters Jarvis	Family Compact		
		Toronto			
12th	1835-1836	James Edward Small	Reformer		
13th	1836-1840	William Henry Draper	Tory		
Legislative Assembly of the Province of Canada
Parliamentary term		Toronto (duo-member seat)			
1st	1841–1843	John Henry Dunn	Reformer	Isaac Buchanan (Note: Resigned on January 2, 1843.)	Reformer
1st	1843–1844	John Henry Dunn	Reformer	Henry Sherwood (Note: Elected in by-election, March 6, 1843.)	Conservative
2nd	1844-1847	William Henry Boulton	Conservative	Henry Sherwood	Conservative
3rd	1848-1851	William Henry Boulton	Conservative	Henry Sherwood	Conservative
4th	1852-1853	William Henry Boulton	Conservative	George Percival Ridout	Conservative
4th	1853-1854	Henry Sherwood	Conservative	George Percival Ridout	Conservative
5th	1854-1857	John Hillyard Cameron	Conservative	John George Bowes	Conservative
6th	1858-1861	John Beverley Robinson	Conservative	George Brown	Reformer
(divided along Yonge Street)		Toronto West		Toronto East	
7th	1861-1863	John Beverley Robinson	Conservative	John Willoughby Crawford	Conservative
8th	1863-1866	John Macdonald	Reformer	Alexander Mortimer Smith	Reformer
