= John Henry Dunn =

Public official in Upper Canada

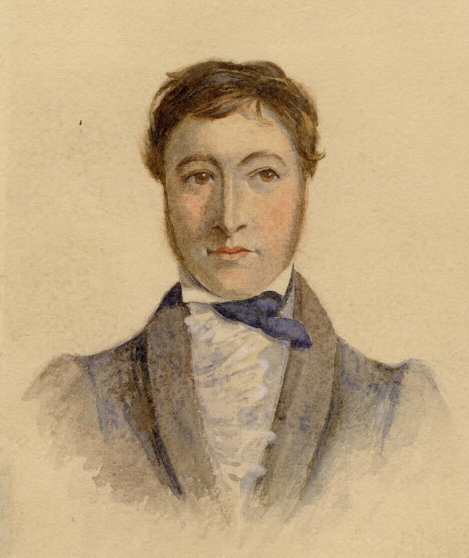

Member of the Legislative Assembly of the Province of Canada for Toronto
- In office 1841–1844 Serving with Isaac Buchanan (1841–1843); Henry Sherwood (1843–1844)
- Preceded by: New position
- Succeeded by: William Henry Boulton

Member of the Legislative Council of Upper Canada
- In office 1822–1841
- Succeeded by: Position abolished

Receiver General, Upper Canada
- In office 1820–1841
- Succeeded by: Position abolished

Receiver General, Province of Canada
- In office 1841–1843
- Preceded by: New Position
- Succeeded by: B. Turquand

Personal details
- Born: 1792 Saint Helena
- Died: April 21, 1854 (aged 61–62) London
- Spouse(s): (1) Charlotte Roberts (May 4, 1820, her death, 1835) (2) Sophie-Louise Juchereau Duchesnay (March 9, 1842, his death, 1854)
- Relations: Alexander Roberts Dunn, VC (son)
- Children: Six sons and two daughters with Charlotte Roberts, including Alexander Roberts Dunn; one daughter and one son with Sophie-Louise Juchereau Duchesnay
- Occupation: Public official, businessman

Military service
- Allegiance: Britain
- Branch/service: Upper Canada militia
- Rank: Lieutenant-Colonel
- Commands: 2nd Regiment of York Militia

John Henry Dunn (1792 – April 21, 1854) was a public official and businessman in Upper Canada, who later entered politics in the Province of Canada. Born on Saint Helena of English parents, he came to Upper Canada as a young man to take up the position of Receiver General for Upper Canada, a position he held from 1820 to 1841.

Upon the creation of the Province of Canada in 1841, he was elected to the Legislative Assembly of the Province of Canada, representing Toronto, from 1841 to 1844. He also served for nearly three years as Receiver General of the new province. He resigned his position as the Receiver General in 1843, as part of the struggle for responsible government. Defeated in the general election of 1844, he returned to England with his family, where he died in 1854.

He was married twice, first to an Englishwoman, Charlotte Roberts, and after her death, to Sophie-Louise Juchereau Duchesnay, a French-Canadian. One of his sons from his first marriage, Alexander Roberts Dunn, entered the British Army and became the first Canadian to earn the Victoria Cross.

== Early life and family ==
Dunn was born on Saint Helena in 1792, son of John Charles Dunn and Elizabeth Bazette. His father was a surgeon, originally from Northumberland. It is believed that he had worked for some time with the East India Company. Dunn's family was sufficiently well-off to ensure he received a good education in England. They also had enough social status that Dunn could marry Charlotte Roberts, from a wealthy Sussex family, and his sister, Mary-Ann, could marry Francis Ogilvy-Grant, later 6th Earl of Seafield.

== Receiver General of Upper Canada ==
In 1820, Dunn was named Receiver General for Upper Canada. He and his 19 year old bride left for York, Upper Canada (later Toronto, Ontario). It is not known how the 28 year old Dunn managed to get the appointment, which was essentially a life tenure, but Dunn attributed it to Charles Grant, later Lord Glenelg, a relation of his sister's husband.

The position was technically to manage the fiscal receipts and expenditures of the provincial government, but Dunn gradually became the general financial advisor to the government, with extensive control over public funds. There was uncertainty throughout Dunn's tenure as to the exact nature of the position. He was appointed by the imperial government, but managed the finances of the province, and was paid by both the imperial government and the provincial government. Dunn at various times asserted that he was independent of either the imperial government or the provincial government, playing the two governments against each other.

During Dunn's term in this post, one of the major financial issues for the province was the sharing of customs revenues between Upper Canada and Lower Canada. The customs revenues were a major portion of the total income of the government of Upper Canada. While the dispute continued, Dunn obtained authority from the provincial government to borrow money from private sources to cover government expenditures. As time went on, the province began to borrow heavily to cover its public works plans, improving roads and canals. Dunn had the primary responsibility for raising the loans, at first locally, and then increasingly on the British financial markets. In particular, his actions in London during the international commercial crisis of 1836–37 likely saved the government of Upper Canada from default, but attracted criticism, both in Upper Canada and from the Colonial Secretary, Lord Glenelg, that one person had control of Upper Canada's finances in this way.

Increasing concerns about Dunn's financial dealings, both in the Colonial Office and in Upper Canada, eventually led the Lieutenant Governor of Upper Canada, Sir George Arthur, to appoint a committee of investigation, composed of members of the Legislative Assembly. The committee found that the financial procedures Dunn followed were much outdated, in particular in allowing commingling of public funds with Dunn's own funds, which made it difficult to track funds. Although that had once been common in British public accounting, it was now recognised as an improvident practice. There was no evidence that Dunn had dealt improperly with the public funds, but he took any criticism of his financial administration as an attack on his personal integrity. Arthur advised the new Governor General, Charles Thomson (later Lord Sydenham) that Dunn was a “weak man, influenced by the impulse of the moment, and wayward to the extreme." Sydenham imposed stricter accounting controls on Dunn, which ensured he would not have unlimited control over the public funds.

== Business dealings ==
In addition to his duties as receiver-general, Dunn also held some corporate directorships. He was a director for the Bank of Upper Canada and also for the British America Fire and Life Assurance Company. However, his main business activity was his involvement in the management of the Welland Canal. At the urgings of William Hamilton Merritt, he served as president of the Welland Canal Company from 1825 to 1833. He was actively involved in obtaining funding for the Canal, from both private sources and eventually from the provincial government, even though he was serving as the main financial advisor to the government. Eventually, the government took over the Welland Canal as a public work.

== Community involvement ==
When he came to Upper Canada, Dunn had all the general characteristics of the Tory elite. In 1822, he was named to the province's Legislative Council, which was a life appointment. He was a congregant and conspicuous donor to St. James church, the oldest Anglican church in Toronto. Over the years, he was engaged in a variety of community organisations, such as a trustee of the Home District Grammar School and the general hospital. He was a member of the Board for the General Superintendence of Education, president of the Upper Canadian Temperance Society and of the Auxiliary Bible Society, treasurer of the masonic lodge of Upper Canada, patron of the York Mechanics’ Institute, and member of the Upper Canada Club. Dunn was the colonel of the 2nd Regiment of York Militia, and sent one of his sons, Alexander Roberts Dunn, to Upper Canada College. In spite of all this activity, however, he never appears to have been part of the social or political elite.

== Political career ==
Dunn's political position was not initially clear, but he gradually evolved from a moderate Tory, without much connection to the oligarchic Family Compact, into a moderate reformer, supporter of Robert Baldwin.

His political leanings began to become apparent in the political tensions leading up to the Upper Canada Rebellion of 1837. Dunn had long sought appointment to the Executive Council of Upper Canada. In 1836 he finally achieved this goal, being appointed through the influence of the Colonial Secretary, Lord Glenelg, who was a family connection of Dunn's sister. Dunn was one of three Reform supporters appointed to the council, the other two being Robert Baldwin and John Rolph. However, just three weeks after his appointment, all six of the Councillors resigned when Lieutenant Governor Sir Francis Bond Head refused to take the advice of the council into account with respect to the governing of the province. For the principle of self-government, Dunn had thrown away a position he had sought for sixteen years. Dunn's relationship with the Lieutenant Governor worsened, with Bond Head unsuccessfully urging Lord Glenelg to dismiss Dunn, saying that Dunn was a supporter of the "revolutionary party".

In the fall-out from the Rebellions of 1837–1838 in both Upper Canada and Lower Canada, the British government decided to unite the two provinces into the Province of Canada in 1841. With the union of the Canadas approaching, Dunn suggested to Governor General Sydenham that Dunn should stand for election to the new Legislative Assembly as a pro-union candidate, and also be appointed receiver general of the new Province of Canada. Sydenham agreed to that proposal, seeing the value of having a popular individual such as Dunn on the pro-union side, but insisted on new controls on the auditing of public accounts, and a commitment that Dunn would resign as receiver general if he was not elected. Sydenham appointed Dunn as receiver general and a member of the Executive Council of the Province of Canada on the day the union was proclaimed, February 10, 1841.

Dunn won election to the Legislative Assembly of the Province of Canada in the first general election of 1841 as one of two members for Toronto, in spite of considerable electoral violence. Toronto was considered a Tory stronghold, and the Tories and the Orange Order of Canada continued to view the Reform programme as leading to the end of the "British connexion." Dunn and his fellow Reform candidate, Isaac Buchanan were even shot at, and a man was killed, at a campaign event in the streets of Toronto. Charles Dickens, who visited Toronto the next year, recounted the events:

It is a matter of deep regret that political differences should have run high in this place, and led to most discreditable and disgraceful results. It is not long since guns were discharged from a window in this town at the successful candidates in an election, and the coachman of one of them was actually shot in the body, though not dangerously wounded. But one man was killed on the same occasion; and from the very window whence he received his death, the very flag which shielded his murderer (not only in the commission of his crime, but from its consequences), was displayed again on the occasion of the public ceremony performed by the Governor General, to which I have just adverted. Of all the colours in the rainbow, there is but one which could be so employed: I need not say that flag was orange.

In the first session of the Parliament, in 1841, Dunn voted in support of the union, and was a consistent supporter of Governor General Sydenham. Sydenham died suddenly at the end of the 1841 session, and in subsequent sessions, Dunn began to vote consistently with the Reform group. Matters came to a head in late 1843, when the Reform ministry led by Louis-Hippolyte LaFontaine and Robert Baldwin resigned from the Executive Council, in protest against the refusal of the Governor General, Charles Theophilus Metcalfe, to consult with the ministry on government appointments. Following the example of Baldwin and LaFontaine, Dunn resigned from the Executive Council and as receiver general, although a month later than Baldwin and LaFontaine, on December 31, 1843.

Dunn was out of office for the first time in twenty-three years and was described as being "like a fish out of water". He stood for re-election in Toronto in the general election of 1844, but was defeated by the Tory candidate.

== Return to England ==
Dunn returned to England the following year with his family, including his new French-Canadian wife. He felt out of place in England, and wrote to Canadian friends that he would like to return to Montreal. He hoped for an appointment when LaFontaine and Baldwin returned to office in 1848, but in vain. He died in London in 1854.

== Family ==
Dunn's first wife, Charlotte, died in 1835. In 1842, Dunn remarried, to Sophia Louisa Juchereau Duchesnay. She was a member of the Juchereau Duchesnay family in Quebec, daughter of A.N.J. Duchesnay, seigneur of Beauport.

Dunn's son by his first wife, Lieutenant Alexander Roberts Dunn, an officer in the 11th Hussars (Prince Albert's Own) cavalry regiment, received the Victoria Cross for his valour as "the bravest of the brave" in the Charge of the Light Brigade at the Battle of Balaclava. Dunn did not live to see the award, having died six months before the battle.

His daughter Louisa Dunn, daughter by his second wife, married Colonel William Henry Rodes Green, CB. Green was appointed a Major-General in 1875, and a Knight Commander of the Star of India in 1886.

== Legacy ==
Dunn Avenue in Toronto is named after him and within the area where he lived during his time in York.
