= Isaac Buchanan =

Province of Canada businessman and politician

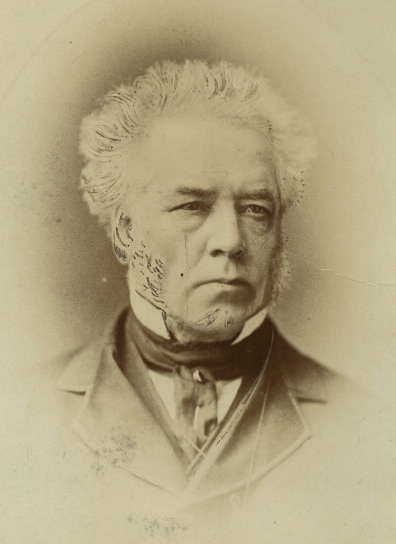

Member of the Legislative Assembly of the Province of Canada for Toronto
- In office 1841–1843 Serving with John Henry Dunn
- Preceded by: New position
- Succeeded by: Henry Sherwood

Member of the Legislative Assembly of the Province of Canada for Hamilton
- In office 1857–1864
- Preceded by: Allan MacNab

Personal details
- Born: July 21, 1810 Glasgow, Scotland
- Died: October 1, 1883 (aged 73) Hamilton, Ontario
- Party: Moderate Reformer
- Spouse: Agnes Jarvie
- Children: Eleven children
- Occupation: Landowner, businessman

Military service
- Allegiance: Britain
- Branch/service: Upper Canada militia
- Years of service: 1837–1838; 1862–1864
- Rank: Lieutenant-Colonel
- Commands: 13th Battalion Volunteer Militia (Infantry)
- Battles/wars: Upper Canada Rebellion

Isaac Buchanan (July 21, 1810 – October 1, 1883) was a businessman, political figure and writer in Upper Canada, then Canada West, Province of Canada (now Ontario). Born in Glasgow, Scotland, he emigrated to British North America in 1830, settling first in Montreal, then York (now Toronto), and then Hamilton. At the height of his business career, he had an extensive house and estate in Hamilton, which he named "Auchmar", in recognition of his Clan Buchanan roots in Scotland.

Buchanan's business was primarily centred in Hamilton and Canada West, but he was an international merchant, with business interests in Scotland and New York as well as Toronto and Montreal. He was the first president of the Hamilton Club, and founder of Hamilton and Toronto boards of trade – forerunners to modern chambers of commerce. He was the founder of the regiment that later became the Royal Hamilton Light Infantry. He was also actively involved in the presbyterian movement in Canada West, helping to establish the Free Church of Scotland in Canada.

Buchanan was elected four times to the Legislative Assembly of the Province of Canada, originally as a moderate Reformer from Toronto, but gradually moving to more conservative opinions, when elected from Hamilton. He was a generous donor to public causes, particularly in the Hamilton area.

Although at one point he was one of the richest men in Canada West, his businesses gradually became unprofitable and failed. He lived in reduced circumstances in his later years, with his income supplemented by a government appointment. He died in Hamilton in 1883.

== Early life ==
Isaac Buchanan was born in Glasgow, Scotland in 1810 to Peter and Margaret Miller Buchanan. Isaac's father and mother were both scions of the Buchanans of Auchmar, a cadet branch of the Clan Buchanan, which was prominent in the Loch Lomond region. Peter Buchanan (1760-1826) established himself as a manufacturer of cloth in Glasgow, with a factory in Hutcheson Street. He became prominent in the city's mercantile community, becoming a member of the Merchants House (an organization of businessmen) and an elder at St. David's Church. Peter Buchanan married Margaret Miller Buchanan in 1800. Margaret was the daughter of Isaac Buchanan of Gartfairn. Her sister was the wife of Peter Buchanan's brother, Andrew. Isaac Buchanan was one of nine children. He attended the Glasgow Grammar School but his ambitions for a professional career were thwarted by family financial reverses and the death of his father in 1825.

== Business career ==
At the urging of his elder brother, Peter Buchanan (1805-1860), Isaac located employment as a clerk with the Glasgow firm of William Guild & Company, traders to the West Indies and Honduras. Isaac became a junior partner in a new firm with his employer's son. The new firm was established for the purpose of opening a wholesale dry-goods store in Montreal, Lower Canada (now Quebec. Buchanan travelled to Montreal in 1830 to take charge of the venture. Soon afterward, Buchanan moved to York, Upper Canada (now Toronto) to be closer to clients in Upper Canada. In 1834, with his brother Peter, he bought the business in York and set up an office in Glasgow. In 1840, he set up a new company in Hamilton; he and his brother also established a Montreal branch. Their business included wholesale grocery trade, iron, hardware, and grain. Part of their successful business model was extension of credit lines to their retail customers.

In 1844, he moved to Hamilton, where he helped set up the Board of Trade, becoming its first president. In 1848, upset by the repeal of the Corn Laws in Britain, he left the business and moved back to Scotland, where he campaigned against free trade in Britain. He argued that the end of the imperial preference would inevitably lead to Canada's annexation by the United States. In 1851, he rejoined the business and returned to Hamilton.

Throughout the 1840s and 1850s, Buchanan, his brother, and other business partners created a large business structure, centred in Hamilton, with branches in Glasgow, Montreal and New York. In 1844, they closed the Toronto branch of the business and expanded the operation in Hamilton. Buchanan travelled back and forth between Canada and Britain on matters related to his business, as well as lobbying on trade issues within the British Empire and Canada. He also became involved in railway politics, as he was concerned that the Grand Trunk Railway, centred in Montreal, could undercut the trade from the Hamilton area. Buchanan invested heavily in the competing Ontario Great Western Railway, centred on Hamilton. He was a director in the Great Western Railway and he attempted to promote its development over those of the competing Grand Trunk.

At the height of his business career, the Buchanan businesses were some of the largest in Canada, and he was a very wealthy man. At the same time, his generosity was legendary, and he often donated money for public purposes.

== Military matters ==
Buchanan was a commissioned officer in the local militia during the Upper Canada Rebellion, leading troops in Toronto and then on the Niagara frontier. He complained about the quality of the troops under his command, mainly of Irish background, but he also stated “if I do get to close Quarters with these infernal Rebels and Yankees I am prepared to sell my Life as dearly as I can.”

Years later, in 1862 when he was established in the Hamilton area, Buchanan founded the 13th Battalion Volunteer Militia (Infantry), which is one of the predecessors of the Royal Hamilton Light Infantry (Wentworth Regiment). He served as lieutenant-colonel of the battalion for two years. On his appointment as lieutenant-colonel, his wife, Agnes Buchanan, presented a stand of colours to the battalion.

== Presbyterian politics ==
Buchanan was a Presbyterian in the Scottish tradition. In the early 1840s, the Church of Scotland went through a period of strong disagreement between those who were content to allow a patron to direct the appointment of a minister to a church, compared to the more evangelical wing, which believed that only the congregation should control the appointment of the minister. This conflict resulted in a schism in the Church of Scotland, called the Disruption of 1843, which resulted in the formation of the Free Church of Scotland.

Buchanan was in Glasgow during this period, and favoured the evangelical approach. When he returned to Canada, he was instrumental in the establishment of Free Church principles in Presbyterian churches in Canada West. He donated at least £650 to the foundation of churches named for Knox in Toronto, Hamilton, and several other Canadian communities. Within the framework of the Free Church, he was generally considered a moderate. The organizational issues raised by the Free Church were closely tied to a major political issue in Canada West, the disposition of the Clergy Reserves, lands set aside by the British government for the benefit of the Anglican church in Canada. Buchanan was one of many Presbyterians who argued that the Presbyterian churches should share in the disposition of the income from the Clergy Reserves, which fit well with the ideology of the Free Church.

== Political career ==
=== Legislative Assembly 1841–1843 ===
Buchanan began to demonstrate his political allegiance as a moderate Reformer shortly after arriving in York and taking up business. He began to make an impression in the town, but he found himself resented by the Tory oligarchy of the Family Compact. He considered them provincial in nature, and resented the strong control which the Anglicans had over the town and the province, compared to his own Scots Presbyterian Church. In 1835 he issued an extra edition of a local newspaper, stridently calling for equal distribution of the revenue from the Clergy Reserves. Similarly, even though he had led a provincial militia unit to help put down the Rebellion, as soon as he returned to Toronto in February 1838, he issued a pamphlet warning that another rebellion was likely, due to "the selfish principles of the high church party".

With that background, it was no surprise that Governor-General Sydenham would consider recruiting Buchanan to stand for election in Toronto. Sydenham was trying to build a coalition which favoured commercial development and excluded from government both the Compact Tories and the "ultra" Reformers led by Robert Baldwin. Buchanan, with his strong business background in both Upper Canada and Lower Canada, his vehemently expressed dislike for the Tories, as well as his calls for reform of the Clergy Reserves, was an obvious candidate for the Sydenham coalition project.

Buchanan was nominated for the Toronto riding in the 1841 general election, along with John Henry Dunn, another moderate Reformer, as candidates for the first Legislative Assembly of the new Province of Canada. The election was hard-fought and violent. The Tories continued to make common cause with the Orange Order in Canada to defend the "British connexion", which they considered endangered by the Reform movement. The worst of the violence occurred in a riot outside Allan's Tavern, a stronghold of the Orange Lodge, where shots were fired into the crowd from an upper window. One man was killed, and a coachman was injured. The Reformers almost tore the tavern down before the arrival of local militia prevented further violence.

Charles Dickens, touring North America the next year, recounted the episode:

It is a matter of deep regret that political differences should have run high in this place, and led to most discreditable and disgraceful results. It is not long since guns were discharged from a window in this town at the successful candidates in an election, and the coachman of one of them was actually shot in the body, though not dangerously wounded. But one man was killed on the same occasion; and from the very window whence he received his death, the very flag which shielded his murderer (not only in the commission of his crime, but from its consequences), was displayed again on the occasion of the public ceremony performed by the Governor General, to which I have just adverted. Of all the colours in the rainbow, there is but one which could be so employed: I need not say that flag was orange.

In spite of Toronto's reputation as a stronghold of the Tories, Buchanan and Dunn were elected to the Legislative Assembly for the city of Toronto, defeating Henry Sherwood and George Monroe.

In the first session of the Legislative Assembly in 1841, Buchanan voted in favour of the union of the Canadas, and was a general supporter of Lord Sydenham's policies. There was one issue upon which he disagreed with Sydenham, and that was Sydenham's proposal for a government bank with a monopoly over issuing bank-notes; essentially an early proposal for a central bank. Buchanan worried that the proposal would shrink the money supply and increase the economic power of Montreal. Although a legislative committee approved the proposal, it was defeated in the Assembly. In the second session, Buchanan voted with the other moderate Reformers, sometimes in opposition to the "ultra" Reformers led by Baldwin.

On the key issue of responsible government, Buchanan disagreed with the position taken by Baldwin, who considered that the governor had to appoint an Executive Council which had the support of a majority of the Legislative Assembly. Buchanan believed that the governor necessarily was the head of the government and had to be able to act independently of the Legislative Assembly, if needed. He thought that responsible government would lead to the end of the British connexion.

Buchanan, always independent minded, disliked the need for alliances and compromises that was necessary to the work of a member of the Legislative Assembly. Believing that responsible government, as he understood it, had been achieved, he resigned his seat in 1843.

=== Legislative Assembly, 1857–1865 ===
In 1857, he was elected to the Legislative Assembly for Hamilton. While in office, he attempted to promote his railway interests but also negotiated refinancing of the city of Hamilton's debts after it borrowed heavily to finance infrastructure improvements. He supported protectionist trade policies and opposed representation by population.

== Family and later life ==
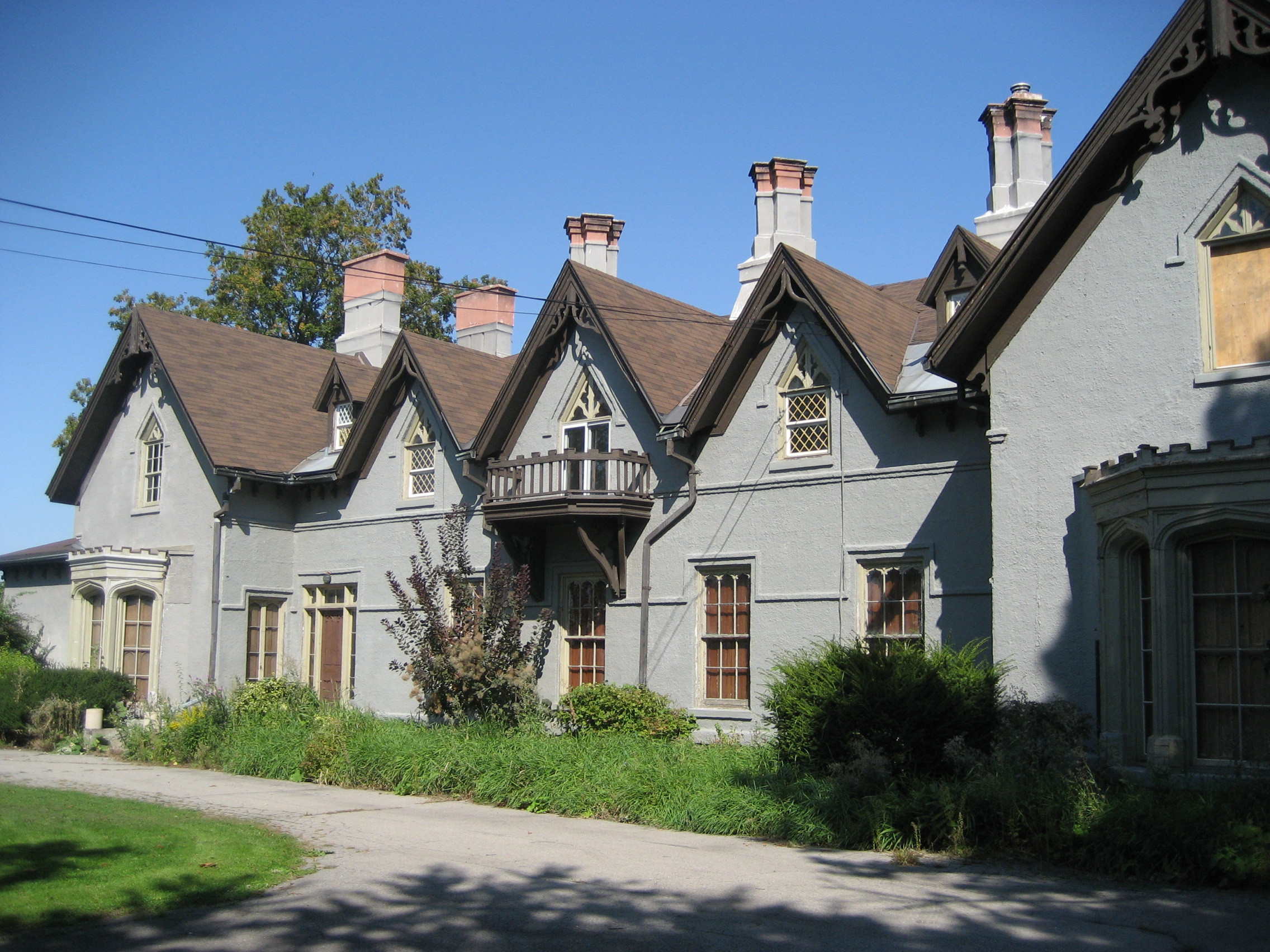
Auchmar, estate of Isaac Buchanan, Hamilton, Ontario

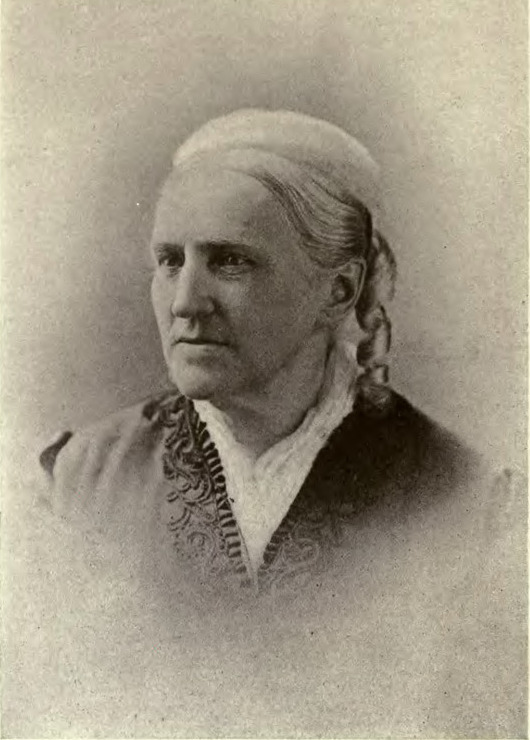
Agnes Jarvie Buchanan

Isaac Buchanan married Agnes Jarvie, daughter of Robert Jarvie, on January 27, 1843, when he was in Scotland. The couple had eleven children.

Following their return to Hamilton, he built an estate, Clairmont Park, in 1852–53. The grounds included a manor house named "Auchmar", after the Buchanan estate his father had purchased before his financial troubles. There was also a gatekeeper's lodge. Both were built in the Gothic Revival style. The Buchanans became known for their generous entertaining, and hosted several of the governors-general and their wives over the years, including Lord and Lady Elgin, Lord and Lady Monck, Lord and Lady Lisgar, Lord and Lady Dufferin, and others.

Buchanan's political interests distracted him from his business interests and, although he resigned his seat in 1865, the business failed in 1867. He sold his estate in Hamilton. Buchanan received a government appointment in 1879 which sustained him through his later years. Buchanan died at Hamilton, October, 1883, aged 73. Agnes Buchanan died in Hamilton, May 7, 1896, aged 71. One of the couple's sons, James Isaac Buchanan, worked as a banker in Pittsburgh, Pennsylvania and made a substantial fortune. He eventually was able to re-buy Auchmar. His sisters lived in it for the next thirty years.

== Legacy ==
Auchmar and the gatehouse still stand at the corner of Fennell Avenue West and West 5th Street and are currently a Hamilton Heritage site, owned by the City of Hamilton. The Friends of Auchmar is a non-profit group dedicated to preserving Auchmar.

The Buchanan neighbourhood on the Hamilton mountain was named after him. It is bounded by Fennell Avenue West (north), Mohawk Road West (south), Garth Street (west), and West 5th Street (east). Landmarks in this neighbourhood include Mohawk College, Hillfield-Strathallan College and Buchanan Park, which was also named after him.

In Markham, York Region, Buchanan Drive is named after him.

== Publications ==
Buchanan was a prolific political pamphleteer over his career. Some of his writings include:

- The real state of things in Canada; explained in a few rough sketches on financial and other vital matters in both the Canadas ... (Toronto, 1837)
- First series of five letters, against the Baldwin faction, by an advocate of responsible government, and of the new college bill (Toronto, 1844)
- Can the British monarchy be preserved? (n.p., 1848)
- The patriotic party versus the cosmopolite party; or, in other words, reciprocal free trade, versus irreciprocal free trade (Toronto, 1848)
- Moral consequences of Sir R. Peel's unprincipled and fatal course, disquiet, overturn and revolution (Greenock, Scot., 1850)
- A thoroughly British legislature wanted, or, in other words, legislation combining patriotism and popularity ... (Greenock, 1850)
- Letters illustrative of the present position of politics in Canada, written on the occasion of the political convention, which met at Toronto, on 9th Nov., 1859 (Hamilton, 1859)
- Britain the country, versus Britain the empire: our monetary distresses – their legislative cause and cure (Hamilton, [Ont.], 1860)
- The relations of the industry of Canada, with the mother country and the United States ..., ed. H. J. Morgan (Montreal, 1864)
- A government specie-paying bank of issue and other subversive legislation, proposed by the finance minister of Canada (Hamilton, 1866)

== Archives ==
The Isaac Buchanan and Family fonds is an extensive collection held by Library and Archives Canada. The archival reference number is R4064, former archival reference number MG24-D16.
