= Auchmar (Hamilton, Ontario) =

Historic building in Ontario, Canada

Coordinates: 43.2391°N 79.882°W

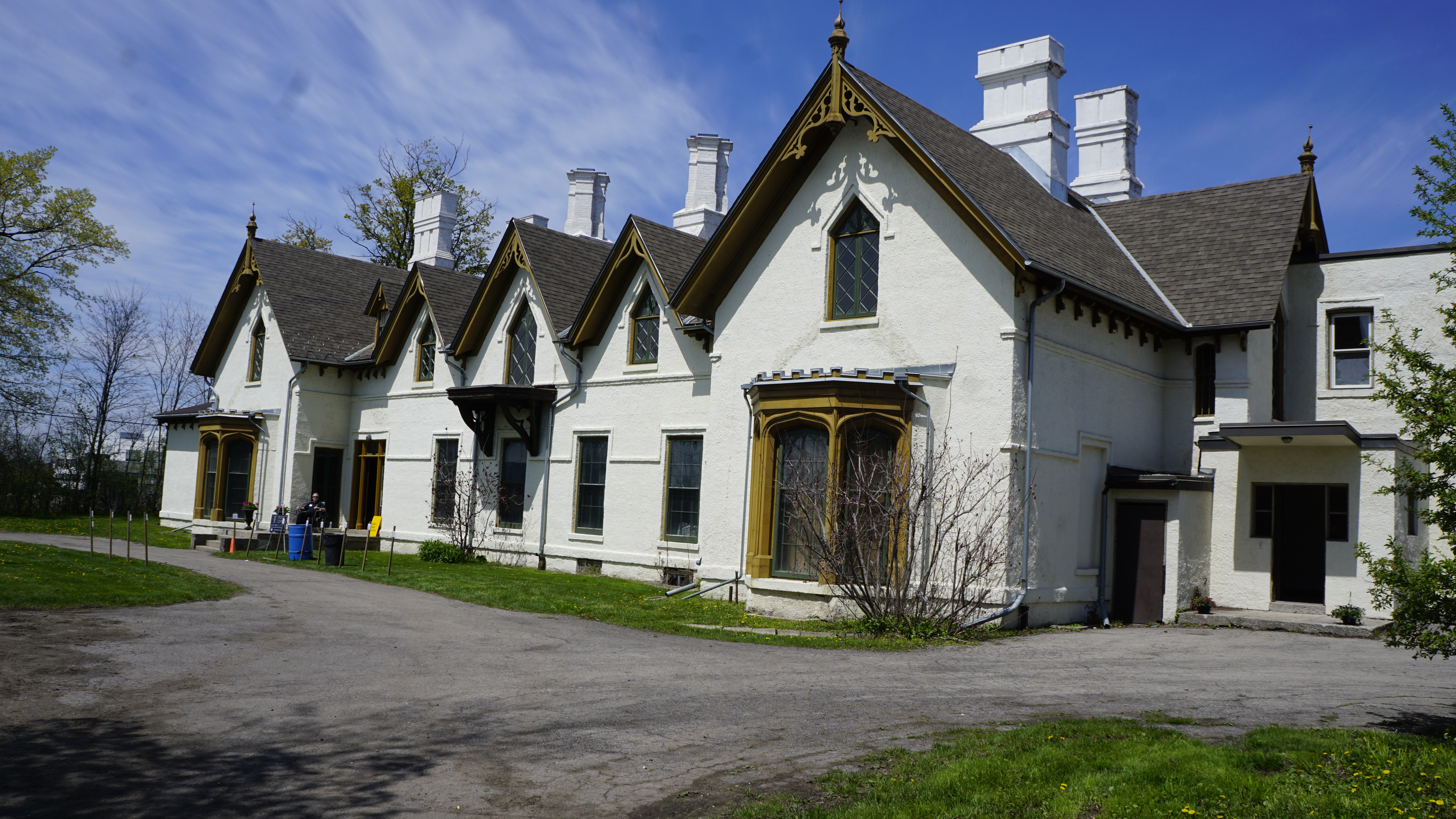
Auchmar

Auchmar House is the centrepiece of Clairmont Park, the estate of the Honourable Isaac Buchanan (1810–1883), one of Hamilton's most influential citizens. It was built between 1852 and 1854 and is located at the northeast corner of Fennell Avenue and West 5th Street. The manor house, its several remaining outbuildings, and stone orchard wall occupy about 8 acres (32,000 m^{2}) of land which include most of the original built features of the estate. However, the tiny Gatekeeper's Lodge, which resembles Auchmar House architecturally, became separated from the surviving portion of Clairmont Park. (It is located on the mountain brow at 71 Claremont Drive.) Auchmar House and the remaining contiguous portion of the Buchanan estate is a unique heritage asset owned by the citizens of Hamilton. It is recognized by the Ontario Heritage Trust as having significant historical value. Auchmar House is recognized as an outstanding example of the domestic Gothic Revival and, with its surrounding acreage, is a very rare example of a mid-Victorian estate in Ontario surviving in relatively intact condition.

Isaac Buchanan served in the Parliament of the United Province of Canada as member for Toronto from 1841 to 1843 and member for Hamilton between 1857 and 1865. Between March and June, 1865 he held the office of President of the Council in the ministry headed by Etienne Tache and John A. Macdonald. His public involvements were diverse and included founding roles in both the Hamilton Board of Trade and the Toronto Board of Trade.

Buchanan was an international merchant, first president of the Hamilton Club, and founder of the Thirteenth Battalion, a regiment which would later become the Royal Hamilton Light Infantry. With Sir Allan MacNab, Bart. (1798-1862) and his elder brother Peter Buchanan (1806-1860), Isaac Buchanan played a key role in the establishment of the Great Western Railroad, which commenced operation in 1854 as the first major railroad in the United Province of Canada.

In addition to his parliamentary career and involvement with numerous public and private bodies, Buchanan became a writer of some note on the subjects of currency and trade and is generally credited as being a formative influence on John A. Macdonald's National Policy.
