= George Sherwood (Province of Canada politician) =

Province of Canada politician and judge

Judge of the County Court, Hastings County
- In office September 2, 1865 – After 1880

Commissioner for Crown Lands, Province of Canada
- In office March 29, 1862 – May 24, 1862
- Monarch: Victoria
- Governor General: Viscount Monck (1862–1867)

Receiver General, Province of Canada
- In office August 7, 1858 – March 29, 1862
- Governor General: Sir Edmund Walker Head (1854–1861)

Member of the Legislative Assembly of the Province of Canada for Brockville
- In office 1841–1847

Personal details
- Born: May 29, 1811 Augusta Township, Upper Canada
- Died: After 1880
- Party: Compact Tory
- Spouse: Mary Drite
- Relatives: Ephraim Jones (grandfather); Levius Peters Sherwood (father); Henry Sherwood (brother)
- Profession: Lawyer, judge

George Sherwood (May 29, 1811 – after 1880) was a judge, lawyer and political figure in Canada West.

== Family and early life ==
Sherwood was born in Augusta Township in 1811, the son of Levius Peters Sherwood and Charlotte Sherwood, daughter of Ephraim Jones. He was of United Empire Loyalist stock on both sides of his family. His older brother, Henry Sherwood, later became Joint Premier of the Province of Canada.

George Sherwood studied law and was called to the bar in 1833, as a barrister at law. The same year he married Marianne Keegan, originally from Nova Scotia. He set up practice in Prescott, originally in partnership with his brother Henry.

== Later career ==
Elected a bencher of the Law Society of Upper Canada in 1849, Sherwood was named Queen's Counsel in 1856. A member of the Church of England, Sherwood donated land valued at £25 for the foundation of Trinity College, an Anglican college in Toronto.

Sherwood was an officer in the local militia, and eventually reached the position of lieutenant-colonel, commanding the 1st Battalion of the Leeds militia. He was also a director of the Brockville and Ottawa Railway.

In his later years, Sherwood was a warden of the Anglican church in Brockville.

== Political career ==
The Sherwoods were part of the Family Compact, the inter-connected families of strong British and Loyalist sympathies which dominated the government of Upper Canada in the early years of the 19th century. When he first entered politics in the general election of 1841, George Sherwood was associated with the Upper Canada Tories. Although he supported the union of Upper Canada and Lower Canada into the new Province of Canada, he was a critic of the Governor General, Lord Sydenham, in the 1841 election. The Tories disagreed with the Governor General's policy of seeking a broad-base of support in the Legislative Assembly, including Reformers, rather than drawing support solely from the Family Compact, as previous governors of Upper Canada had done.

Sherwood successfully stood for election for the electoral district of Brockville in the 1841 general election for the 1st Parliament of the Province of Canada. He was re-elected in the elections of 1844 and 1848, but defeated in the general elections of 1851 and 1854. He was re-elected in the general election of 1857 and served in Parliament until 1863.

In 1845, Sherwood was appointed a commissioner to review the management of public works in the Province. By 1858 he was a supporter of the Liberal-Conservative party, and entered Cabinet that year in the John A. Macdonald–George-Étienne Cartier ministry. He served from 1858 to 1862 as Receiver General, and was an ex officio member of the Board of Railway Commissioners. He held those positions until March, 1862, when he became Commissioner of Crown Lands. He resigned from Cabinet in May, 1862.

== Judicial career ==
In 1865, he was appointed judge of the County Court for Hastings County. As a judge, he was reported to be "courteous, cool and impartial".

His date of death is uncertain. He was known to be still sitting as a judge in 1880.
