= Henry Sherwood =

Province of Canada politician and premier

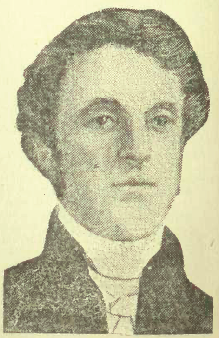
- Henry Sherwood, QC

4th Premier of Canada West
- In office 1847–1848
- Preceded by: William Henry Draper
- Succeeded by: Robert Baldwin

7th Mayor of Toronto
- In office 1842–1844
- Preceded by: George Monro
- Succeeded by: William Henry Boulton

Member of the Legislative Assembly of Upper Canada for Brockville
- In office 1836–1841
- Preceded by: David Jones
- Succeeded by: Position abolished

Member of the Legislative Assembly of the Province of Canada for Toronto
- In office 1843–1854
- Preceded by: Isaac Buchanan
- Succeeded by: John George Bowes

Alderman, Toronto Council
- In office 1841–1849

Personal details
- Born: 1807 Augusta Township, Upper Canada
- Died: July 7, 1855 (aged 47–48) Bad Kissingen, Bavaria
- Party: Tory
- Spouse: Mary Graham Smith
- Relatives: Ephraim Jones (grandfather); Levius Peters Sherwood (father); George Sherwood (brother); Samuel Sherwood (brother)
- Profession: Lawyer

Military service
- Allegiance: Britain
- Branch/service: Upper Canada militia
- Years of service: 1824 - 1855
- Rank: Lieutenant-Colonel
- Unit: 4th Leeds Militia (1824); 1st West York Militia (1827); 2nd North York Militia (1838)
- Battles/wars: Battle of Gallows Hill

Henry Sherwood, QC (1807 – July 7, 1855) was a lawyer and Tory politician in the Province of Canada. He was involved in provincial and municipal politics. Born into a Loyalist family in Brockville in Augusta Township, Upper Canada, he studied law and was called to the bar of Upper Canada in 1828. In 1838, he was appointed Queen's Counsel. Sherwood was part of the Family Compact, the inter-connected families of strong British and Loyalist sympathies which dominated the government of Upper Canada in the early years of the 19th century

Sherwood was a member of the provincial Parliament of Upper Canada, elected in 1836, and subsequently was elected to the Parliament of the Province of Canada, although defeated in his first election attempt in 1841. He held the positions of Solicitor-General of Canada West and Joint Premier of the Province of Canada. He was also involved in municipal politics in Toronto. He was elected to the town council of Toronto in 1841, and was elected to three annual terms as Mayor of Toronto by the council, serving from 1842 to 1844. He was also a member of the Orange Order in Canada.

Sherwood was involved in two political riots. While serving his articles under the Attorney General of Upper Canada, he was one of the rioters in the Types Riot, which destroyed the printing press of William Lyon Mackenzie, publisher of the reform newspaper, the Colonial Advocate. The second riot occurred after his initial defeat in provincial elections in 1841, in which a man was shot dead. The assailant fired the shot from a tavern owned by Sherwood's brother, Samuel Sherwood.

Suffering from ill health, Henry Sherwood died in Bavaria in 1855 while travelling in Europe, at the age of 48.

== Family and early life ==
Sherwood was born in 1807 in Augusta Township, Upper Canada. He was the oldest son of Levius Peters Sherwood and Charlotte Sherwood, daughter of Ephraim Jones. Sherwood was of Loyalist stock on both sides of his family, mainly centred in the town of Brockville. One of his brothers, George Sherwood, also was a lawyer and involved in politics, while another brother, Samuel Sherwood, became High Constable of the Toronto Police Department.

The Sherwoods were aligned with the Family Compact, an interconnected oligarchic group which controlled the government of Upper Canada. He was educated at the Home District Grammar School, operated by the Anglican priest, John Strachan, who later became the first Anglican Bishop of Toronto.

In 1829, Sherwood married Mary Graham Smith, also of Loyalist background. The couple had eighteen children.

== Participation in the Types Riot ==
After his schooling, Sherwood went to York (now Toronto), the capital of Upper Canada, to read for the bar. He was taken on as an articled clerk by his uncle, Henry John Boulton, the Solicitor General of Upper Canada. While engaged in his legal studies, at age 19, Sherwood participated in the Types Riot, organised by members of the Family Compact. The rioters destroyed the printing press of the Colonial Advocate, a political newspaper published by the radical reformer, William Lyon Mackenzie. Mackenzie sued eight of the rioters, including Sherwood, and obtained a jury verdict of civil damages for $2,500 and court costs against the group. The rioters were subsequently charged criminally and convicted, paying fines of five shillings each.

== Law practice and business activities ==
After being called to the bar in 1828, Sherwood returned to Brockville and opened a law practice, in partnership with his younger brother George. He was also involved in local businesses, including land development and banking. In 1835 he moved to York and continued to practise law there for the rest of his life, although he maintained connections to the business and legal matters in the Brockville area. He was appointed Queen's Counsel on January 23, 1838. Although his finances were initially stretched, by 1843 he was in comfortable circumstances, and by the time of his death ten years later, he was said to have "the best professional practice of any lawyer in Toronto."

== Militia service ==
Sherwood joined the 4th Regiment of the Leeds Militia on March 15, 1824, as an Ensign. On May 16, 1827, he was commissioned as a Lieutenant in the 1st Regiment of the West York Militia, and on January 22, 1838, commissioned as Lieutenant-Colonel in the 2nd Regiment of the North York Militia.

Upon the outbreak of the Upper Canada Rebellion in 1837, Sherwood was appointed aide-de-camp to the Lieutenant Governor of Upper Canada, Sir Francis Bond Head.

He marched with the militia force of some 1200 troops which attacked and dispersed a group of some 200 (150 plus "several dozen") rebels at Gallows Hill on December 7, 1837 whilst marching towards Montgomery's Tavern, where they would engage the remaining forces using the tavern as headquarters. Gallows Hill was located just north of Toronto and a few miles at most from the tavern. The rebel leaders had placed sentries on the hill to watch for marching troops, so when the government troops marched through Gallows Hill the rebels had been waiting in ambush and ready to attack. A group of 150 rebels had taken up an ambush position in a field on the west side of Younge Street, some half-mile from the tavern, and a group of "several dozen" rebels took up position in a field on the east side of Younge Street, behind a fence made from tree stumps. The rebels would be the first to open fire upon the government/militia troops. This event is known as the Battle of Gallows Hill.

Sherwood was involved in the prosecutions in several trials from December 1838 to January 1839 which arose from the Rebellion, and also the subsequent incursions from the United States in the Patriot War. In his capacity as a militia officer, he was the judge advocate in the court-martial of some 44 rebel prisoners (including Joshua Doan) in London accused of participating in a Patriot incursion in December 1838. Several were found guilty and sentenced to death. Sherwood's conduct of the trials was praised by members of the court and also by the prisoners.

== Provincial politics ==
=== Upper Canada ===
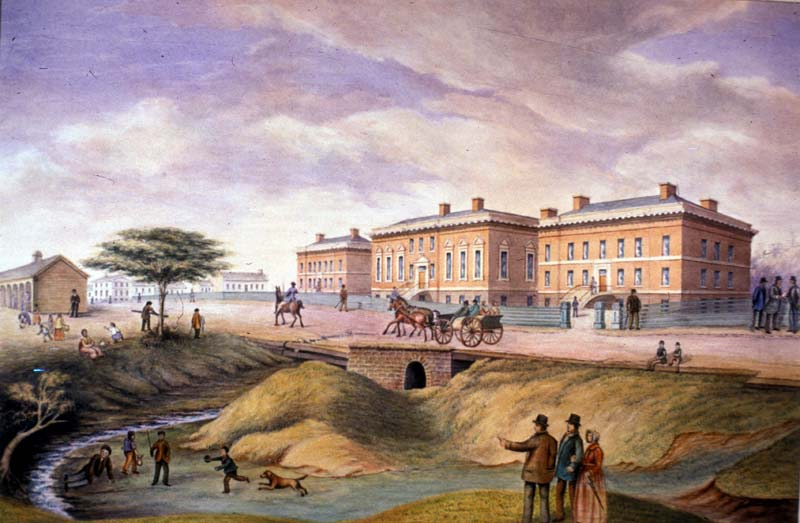
Parliament of Upper Canada

Sherwood had political ambitions, with an affiliation for the Upper Canada Tories. In 1830 he stood for election to the Legislative Assembly of Upper Canada for the district of Leeds, but came in last. In 1834, he tried again, this time for the town of Brockville, but lost by one vote to David Jones. In 1836, Sherwood was elected to the Legislative Assembly for the 13th Parliament of Upper Canada. This was the last Parliament of the province of Upper Canada, which in 1841 was united with the province of Lower Canada into the new Province of Canada by the Act of Union 1840, enacted by the British Parliament.

In his term in the Assembly, Sherwood favoured measures to increase economic development, but at the same time, argued for a decentralised banking system, to avoid financial dominance from Toronto. After the Rebellions of 1837–1838, he took a strong position against proposals for joining the provinces of Upper Canada and Lower Canada into a single province with a legislative union, a position which was more extreme than that of many other Tories, who were prepared to consider such a union. He acquired a reputation for hostility towards French-Canadians. He was opposed to the implementation of responsible government and an elective upper house, but also rejected British interference in the internal affairs of the province.

=== Province of Canada ===
==== Electoral record ====
In March 1841, Sherwood stood for election to the new Parliament of the Province of Canada, this time in Toronto, with the Mayor of Toronto, George Monro, as his co-candidate on a Tory ticket. Despite having the full backing of the Orange Order and the conservative establishment, they were defeated in the election by the Reform candidates, Isaac Buchanan and John Dunn. A riot ensued the next day when a victory parade by the Reformers was attacked by Orangemen carrying knives, sticks and firearms. The Orangemen were based at the Coleraine Tavern and had been brought in from Scarborough, Ontario by the tavern's owner, Samuel Sherwood, who was Henry Sherwood's brother. One man was killed by a shot fired from the tavern. Samuel Sherwood went on to serve as the high constable of the Toronto Police Department from 1852 to 1859.

Charles Dickens, visiting Toronto at the time, observed:

It is a matter of deep regret that political differences should have run high in this place, and led to the most discreditable results. It is not long since guns were discharged from a window in this town at the successful candidates in an election, and the coachman of one of them was actually shot in the body, though not dangerously wounded. But one man was killed on the same occasion; and from the very window whence he received his death, the very flag which shielded his murderer (not only in the commission of his crime but from its consequences), was displayed again on the occasion of the public ceremony performed by the Governor General, to which I have just adverted. Of all the colours in the rainbow, there is but one which could be so employed: I need not say that the flag was orange.

In early 1843, Buchanan resigned from the Legislative Assembly, satisfied that his objective of securing responsible government had been secured. In the resulting by-election, Sherwood again stood for election and this time was successful.

He was re-elected to the second Parliament in 1844, and the third Parliament in 1848. He was not originally elected to the fourth Parliament in 1852, but was elected in 1853 in a by-election. He was defeated in the general election of 1854.

During the Crisis of 1849, Sherwood both advocated for and became a prominent figure within the British American League, who wished to see a "federative union" of British North American Colonies. The British American League was juxtaposed to the Montreal Annexation Manifesto, the latter of which wished to see the Province of Canada annexed into the United States following dissatisfaction from the governing and policies of the British Colonial government.

==== Executive positions ====
The Governor General, Sir Charles Bagot, had instructions from the British government to bring both English and French Canadians into his government, to solidify support for the new Province of Canada. At the same time, he was not to encourage developments towards responsible government. To fulfill these instructions, he sought to create a ministry with members from across the political spectrum. Sherwood was invited to join the new ministry as solicitor-general for Canada West, although he did not hold a seat in the Assembly. However, he only held the position for six weeks, from July 23 to September 16, 1842, as Bagot found that he had to re-organise the ministry and Sherwood lost the position.

From May 28, 1847, to March 11, 1848, Sherwood served as Joint Premier of the Province of Canada for Canada West along with his counterpart Denis-Benjamin Papineau who represented Canada East.

== Municipal politics ==
Sherwood was also involved in municipal politics in Toronto. In 1841, he was elected alderman of St. David's ward. When the council met in January 1842, he was elected as the seventh Mayor of Toronto, succeeding Munro. He was re-elected mayor in 1843 and 1844.

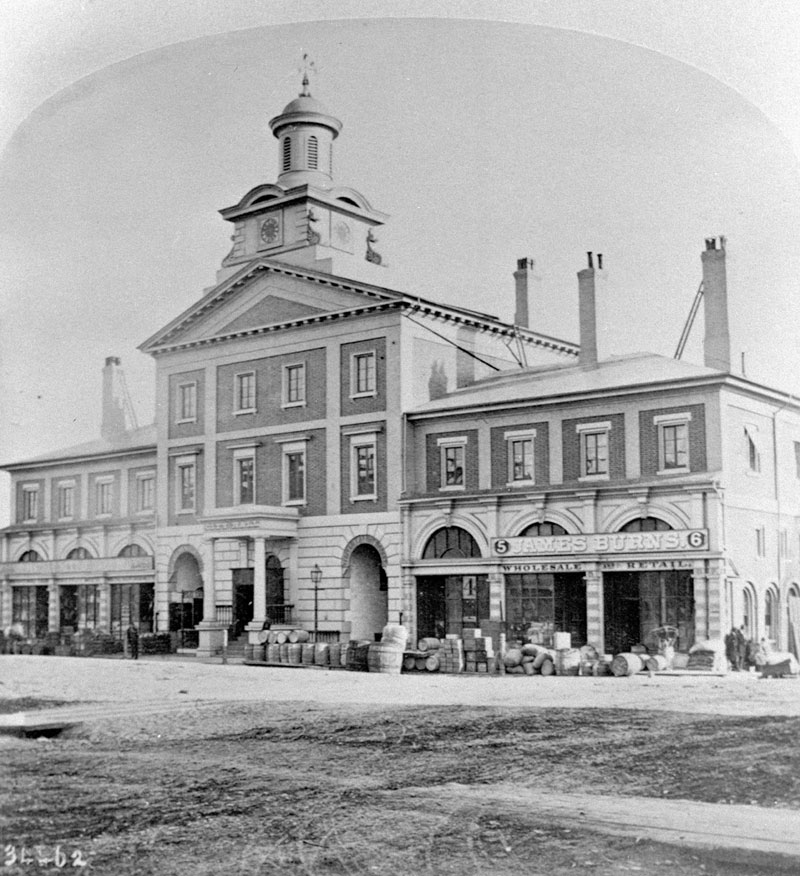
Old City Hall, begun in 1844, as it appeared in 1868

He was a successful mayor. Credit belongs to the committees of council, but Sherwood worked assiduously on the standing committees, with moderation and fairness. He oversaw the regulation of the market, paving the streets and collecting taxes. In 1842, 94 gas lights illuminated King and Yonge Streets and a waterworks was underway. Sherwood saw that the Town Hall was too small for the growing civic government and the plans were drawn for Toronto's first municipal offices. Construction began on the new City Hall (now St. Lawrence Market South) in the summer of 1844 at Jarvis and Front Streets.

Sherwood sat on city council after his final mayoralty term until 1849.

== Death ==
Sherwood suffered from ill health later in life and died in Bavaria in 1855 while travelling in Europe.
