= David Jones (Upper Canada politician) =

Upper Canada lawyer, judge and politician

David Jones (1792 – June 26, 1870) was a lawyer, judge and political figure in Upper Canada. He represented Leeds from 1824 to 1828 and Brockville from 1834 to 1836 in the Legislative Assembly of Upper Canada as a Conservative member.

He was born in Montreal, the son of Daniel Jones, a United Empire Loyalist, and Margaret Hartley. Jones married Catherine Eliza Hayes. He lived in Brockville. He served in the militia, reaching the rank of lieutenant-colonel and also was a justice of the peace and registrar for Leeds County. Jones was named a judge in the court for the Eastern District in 1825. He resigned from the bench in 1842 because legislation had been passed that would have forced him to reside in Dundas County.
