= Isabella Macdonald =

Wife of the first Prime Minister of Canada

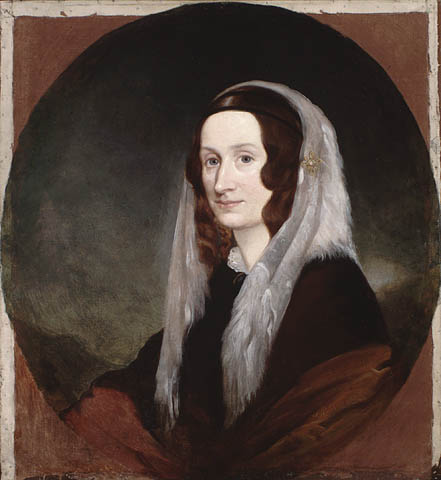
- Portrait of Isabella Clark in 1828
- Born: Isabella Clark; 1807; Dalnavert, Inverness-shire
- Died: 28 December 1857 (aged 47–48); Kingston, Canada West
- Resting place: Cataraqui Cemetery
- Spouse: John A. Macdonald (m. 1843)
- Children: 2, including Hugh John Macdonald

Isabella Macdonald (née Clark; 1809 – 28 December 1857) was the first wife of John A. Macdonald, one of the fathers of the Canadian federation, and ultimately the first Prime Minister of Canada. After marrying Macdonald in Kingston, Ontario in 1843, she enjoyed two years of happy marriage before falling seriously ill. Her first son died at 13 months but her second son, Hugh John Macdonald, became Premier of Manitoba. Despite some better spells, she died aged 48, never recovering from her illness.

== Early life and family ==
Isabella Clark was born in Dalnavert in Inverness-shire, Scotland.

She met her husband to be, her half-cousin John Alexander Macdonald, while he was in Great Britain in 1842. The visit included a trip to Douglas on the Isle of Man to see his cousin Margaret Greene née Clark who lived in a small farmhouse near Douglas together with her sister Isabella. Macdonald took an immediate liking to Isabella, suggesting she should visit Kingston the following year, ostensibly to see another of her sisters, Maria, who had married John Alexander Macpherson. Isabella complied, sailing to Canada in 1843 to visit the Macphersons in Kingston, Ontario, as well as the Macdonalds. It was on this trip that after a few months courting, they were engaged and finally married on September 1, 1843, at the home of her sister, Maria and brother-in-law John Alexander Macpherson with the Rev. Mr. Machar of St. Andrew's Presbyterian Church (Kingston, Ontario) officiating. The couple were related by sharing their maternal grandmother; cousin marriage was not uncommon at the time. They lived together in Kingston.

Isabella bore two sons with John. The first was named John, born in New York in August 1847. She was 39 years old. Isabella's health after the birth was not good - it took several months of rest before she was able to return to Kingston. The baby died at the age of 13 months. She gave birth to their second son at the age of 41. This child was Hugh John Macdonald, who grew up to be a lawyer and politician.

== Illness ==
Approximately two years after her marriage to John A. Macdonald, Isabella's health began to deteriorate. She had a variety of symptoms, including headaches, a bad cough, fatigue, and general pain. The pain would often be so bad she would be unable to get out of bed.

Several strategies were used to attempt to improve her health. John took her to New York to see if the doctors there were able to help her, and she would escape the cold climate of Kingston, Ontario by visiting her sister in Savannah, Georgia for a few months at a time. John rented Bellevue House, a home in the Western Liberties neighborhood of Kingston (a quieter, cleaner area of town) as a restful space for Isabella to improve her health, and recover.

Unfortunately, she never recovered her health, and died on December 28, 1857, at the age of 48. She is buried at the Cataraqui Cemetery, in the Macdonald family plot.
