= Dalnavert, Highland =

Coordinates: 57.1316°N 3.8863°W

Dalnavert: Scottish Gaelic: Dail nam Feart
- Location within the Badenoch and Strathspey area
- OS grid reference: NH859061
- Council area: Highland
- Country: Scotland
- Sovereign state: United Kingdom
- Post town: Kingussie
- Postcode district: PH21
- Police: Scotland
- Fire: Scottish
- Ambulance: Scottish

Dalnavert (Scottish Gaelic Dail nam Feart) is a small rural hamlet, that lies 4 miles northeast of Insh, and 8 miles northeast of Kingussie, in the strath of the River Spey, in the west Cairngorms National Park, in Badenoch and Strathspey, Inverness-shire, Scottish Highlands and is in the Scottish council area of Highland. Dalnavert is the ancestral home of Sir John A. Macdonald, first Prime Minister of Canada. Both his mother and first wife came from Dalnavert.

The single track B970 B road which connects Kingussie to Inverdruie passes Dalnavert.
