= Bellevue House =

Historic site in Kingston, Ontario

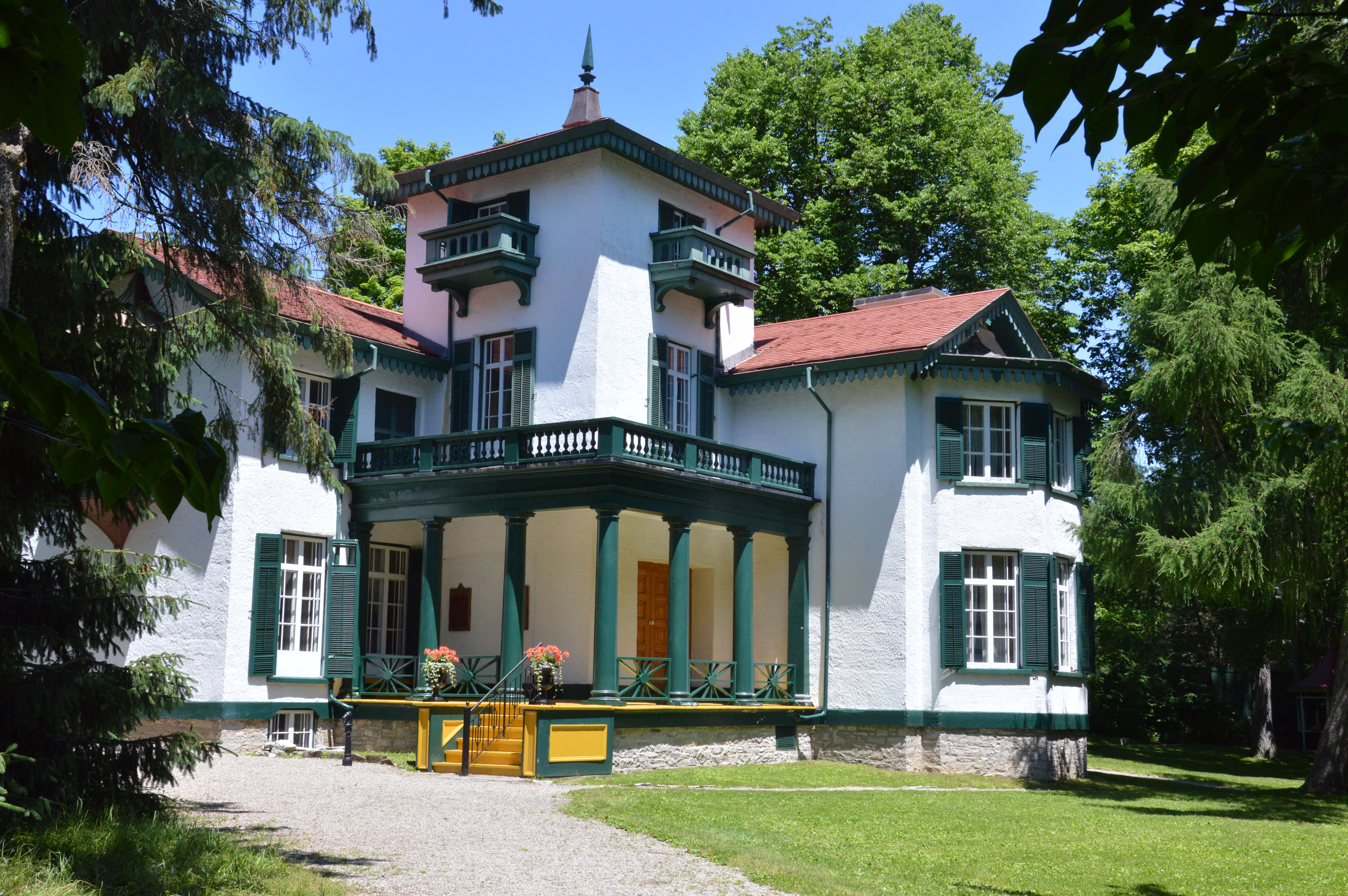
- Interactive map of Bellevue House
- Type: Historic House
- Location: 35 Centre Street; Kingston, Ontario, Canada
- Coordinates: 44°13′22″N 76°30′12″W
- Built: 1840–1841
- Built for: Charles Hales
- Architectural style: Italian Villa
- Governing body: Parks Canada
- Website: Official website

National Historic Site of Canada
- Official name: Bellevue House National Historic Site
- Designated: 6 July 1995
- Reference no.: 388

Bellevue House National Historic Site was the home to Canada's first Prime Minister, Sir John A. Macdonald from 1848 to 1849. The house is located in Kingston, Ontario.

Bellevue House was constructed around 1840 for Charles Hales, a wealthy Kingston merchant who profited greatly from the prosperous decade of the 1830s. The house, which is located at 35 Centre St. between Union and King streets, is one of the first examples of Italian Villa architecture in Canada. Sir John A. Macdonald moved into the house with his wife Isabella Clark and their son John Alexander in 1848.

== Architecture and layout ==
Bellevue House is notable for the non-symmetrical Italian Villa style of its architecture. Features of Italianate architecture at Bellevue House include an L-shaped layout with two wings extending from a square central tower; different varieties and shapes of windows and roof gables; and multiple small balconies.

The house has three main floors, but is further divided by seven levels. The first floor is notable for the very large drawing room, containing a parlour piano manufactured in London, England in about 1820 and two oil paintings whose subjects are unknown. The first floor of the house also contains the formal dining room and a room that is currently interpreted as Isabella's bedroom (though this would likely have been a morning room for other families living at Bellevue in the 19th century).

A kitchen is located in the cellar. The basement contains both a storage area (used for the storage of fruits, vegetables, and preserves) and a laundry room. On the top floor of the house, several rooms are interpreted. These include a guest room, maid's bedroom, nursery, study, dressing room and master bedroom. The observation floor of the central tower looks out upon Lake Ontario.

== History ==
=== Occupancy by John A. Macdonald, 1848–49 ===
Much of what is known about the stay of Sir John A. Macdonald and his family at Bellevue has been gleaned from both general historical knowledge of the 19th century in Kingston and from five letters that Macdonald himself wrote while living at Bellevue. The Macdonalds rented Bellevue from Charles Hales in the hope that the fresh air of what were then the outer suburbs of Kingston would assist in Isabella's recovery. The experiment was a failure, and Isabella did not recover from her chronic malady. In addition to this burden, tragedy further struck the young family when their first-born son, John Alexander Jr., died in the house a month after his first birthday.

As a lawyer and a member of the Legislative Assembly of the Province of Canada, Macdonald was often absent from Bellevue House, visiting his second law office in Toronto or attending parliamentary sessions in Montreal. Isabella's health continued to fluctuate during this time. Despite her frail condition, however, Macdonald reports in his letters that she kept a watchful eye on the servants and the day-to-day affairs of the house.

While entertaining was expected of prominent lawyers and politicians like Macdonald in the 19th century, Isabella's frail condition prevented her from fulfilling this part of her responsibility as a politician's wife. For this reason, the drawing room and the back parlour would likely not have been used while the Macdonald family stayed at Bellevue House. The only guest that is known to have stayed at Bellevue House between 1848 and 1849 while the Macdonalds lived at the villa was Lt. Col. John Clark, an officer in the British military who was Isabella's brother and a trusted member of the family.

Given the expenses associated with renting Bellevue and the fact that Isabella continued to suffer from chronic illness, the Macdonald family moved from Bellevue House in 1849 to another house in Kingston. At the time of the move, Isabella was pregnant with their second child, Hugh John Macdonald.

=== Family home and restoration, 1849–1967 ===
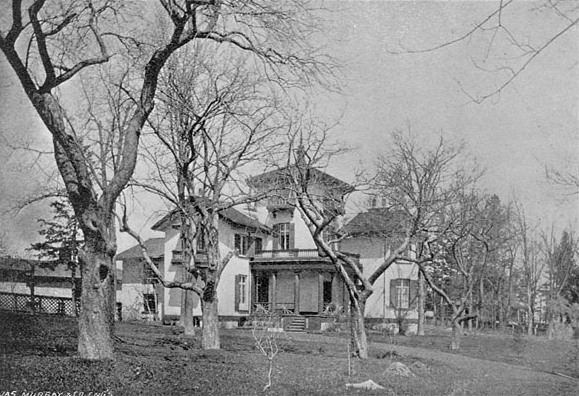
Bellevue circa 1891

Bellevue House continued to be inhabited by middle-class Kingston families until it was purchased by Parks Canada in 1964 with the intention of commemorating Sir John A. Macdonald. Significant renovations had been performed in the intervening century, including the addition of electricity, indoor plumbing, and central heating, as well as changes to the floor plan. Parks Canada historians and archaeologists did significant research to determine how the home would have appeared in the late 1840s, and it was restored both indoors and outdoors to its original colours and wallpaper patterns. Furnishings from the 1820s–1840s were purchased from antique dealers in Kingston and surrounding areas to lend as much authenticity as possible to the site. The site also received a few items that would have belonged to Macdonald in the late 1840s, including a portion of his library. Bellevue House opened as a "national historic park" in 1967, to coincide with the centennial of Canadian Confederation.

==== List of known inhabitants of Bellevue House ====
1. 1839–1841: Charles Hales
2. 1841–42: Tenant
3. 1842–1845: Charles Hales
4. 1845–1848: a variety of tenants, including Col James Harvey and William Ermatinger
5. 1848–49: John A. and Isabella Macdonald
6. 1849–1851: unoccupied
7. 1853–1869: Mr. & Mrs. Ferguson
8. 1869–1879: James Davis
9. 1870–1877: Thomas Baker
10. 1877–1887: Lt. Col. P W Worsley
11. 1887–1905: James Wilson
12. 1905–06: Herbert Howard
13. 1906–07: unoccupied
14. 1907–1923: John Nathan Gilbert
15. 1923–1927: unoccupied
16. 1927–1959: F. W. Atack
17. 1959–1964: Dr. J. M. R. Beveridge, professor at Queen's University.

== Current use ==
Bellevue House is a National Historic Site owned and operated by Parks Canada. It is the only national park system unit commemorating Macdonald as first Prime Minister, and is one of the main attractions in Kingston. Admission lets visitors explore an exhibit on The Many Voices of Confederation, see a rotating exhibit in the Visitor's Centre, browse artifacts and experience interpretative techniques meant to bring alive what life was like for the Macdonalds as a middle-class family in Kingston in the 1840s.

The visitor centre, located on the site of what was the old coach house beside Bellevue, welcomes visitors with a display area filled with artifacts related to Sir John, and a gift shop. Visitors are welcome to look around, take a photos, and then continue to the historic house where guided and self-guided tours are available from interpreters dressed as gentlemen and maids from the 1840s.
