= Police brutality against Indigenous Canadians =

Police brutality is an instance or pattern of excessive and unwarranted force used against an individual or group of people. The Indigenous peoples of Canada include, as designated by the Canadian government, Inuit, Metis, and First Nations individuals and are officially considered Aboriginal peoples. Indigenous Canadians have experienced strenuous relationships with police as a result of colonization and lasting tensions. Since the early 2000s, several instances of police brutality against Indigenous Canadians have prompted media attention.

== Prevalence ==
According to a CTV News analysis, an Indigenous Canadian has been over ten times more likely than a white Canadian to be shot and killed by a police officer since 2017. According to the Yellowhead Institute, an Indigenous-focused research organization within the Faculty of Arts at Toronto Metropolitan University, police brutality in Canada is a result of structural racism and colonization. Data from the 2020 General Social Survey reveals that only 52% of Indigenous Canadians age 15 and older reported that they were confident in the police force. Comparatively, respondents to the same survey who were non-Indigenous and classified as non-visible minority group ranked confidence in police higher, with 70% of this population indicating that they were confident in the police and 11% ranking little or no confidence in the police.

== Causes ==
2019 General Social Survey data reveals that 33% of Indigenous Canadians experienced discrimination in the five year period before the survey was conducted. Common causes for this were ethnicity, culture, race, and skin color. Among Indigenous respondents who indicated they had experienced discrimination, 21% reported that the discrimination occurred while interacting with the police. For reference, among non-Indigenous, non-visible minority respondents who reported instances of discrimination in the same period, only 4% indicated this occurred during interactions with the police.

Additionally, crimes against Indigenous Canadians may be poorly addressed by law enforcement. A notable instance of this is the investigations into murders of women along the Highway of Tears between 1989 and 2006. During this time period, nine women either went missing or were found murdered along a 724-kilometer stretch of Highway 16 in British Columbia, Canada, eight of whom were Indigenous Canadians. Indigenous communities in the area have reported numbers that exceed 30 missing and/or murdered women in this area, however. Commissioner Wallace Taroo Oppal, known familiarly as Wally Oppal, found critical failures in the investigations pertaining to reporting, initial investigation, follow-up investigation, and communications with family members and reportees.

In a qualitative study of young Indigenous and Black Canadian men who had experienced police interactions between February 2019 and March 2020, Indigenous Canadian youth revealed their concern that negative stereotypes of First Nations peoples impact how the police treat them.

== Effects ==
According to data from 2016, Indigenous Canadians were accused of homicide at a rate eleven times higher than that of white Canadians. The 2017-2018 Annual Report of the Office of the Correctional Investigator shows that the proportion of all federally incarcerated inmates who are Indigenous rose from 20% in the 2008-2009 Annual Report to 28%. The proportion is even higher for Indigenous Canadian women, increasing from 32% to 40% of federally incarcerated women in the same time period. For comparison, Indigenous Canadians compose 4.1% of the total Canadian population.

Policing and other governmental structures may contribute to the continuous marginalization of Indigenous Canadians. Tribal Critical Race Theory, which is being used to approach new ideas of policing in Canada, is an emerging area of study that emphasizes maintaining a strong Indigenous identity such that western education systems do not usurp Indigenous practices.

== History and specific cases ==
The Report of the Saskatchewan Indian Justice Review Committee, published in 1992, highlights that the committee received a significant quantity of complaints regarding Indigenous policing by the Saskatoon Police, including issues of excessive force, disrespect for accused persons, selective enforcement practices, and witness intimidation.

The 1999 Report of the Aboriginal Justice Inquiry of Manitoba reveals that Indigenous Canadians were more likely to be denied bail than non-Indigenous individuals and that Indigenous Canadians spent more time, on average, in pre-trial detention than non-Indigenous individuals.

=== Saskatoon freezing deaths (aka Starlight Tours) ===
The Saskatoon freezing deaths, or Starlight Tours, are a series of mysterious deaths of Indigenous Canadians. One of the more publicized incidents occurred in November 1990, the body of Neil Stonechild, a Saulteaux First Nations teenage boy, was discovered in a field outside of Saskatoon, Saskatchewan. Stonechild's cause of death was determined to be hypothermia. Witness Jason Roy reported to have last seen Stonechild in the back seat of a Saskatoon Police cruiser, stating that Stonechild was visibly bloodied and yelling for help.

On the night of January 28, 2000, Darrell Night, a member of Cree Nation, was taken into a police vehicle by two white Saskatoon Police officers. The officers removed Night from the vehicle about five kilometers outside of Saskatoon, forced his head onto the hood of the car, removed his handcuffs, and drove away. Night was dressed in a tee shirt and denim jacket, with temperatures reaching as low as -22 °C. Night was able to walk to the Queen Elizabeth power station, at which a point a watchman let him inside the station.

At least five bodies of Indigenous men have been found frozen in this area outside of Saskatoon. Two of these men, Rodney Niastus and Lawrence Wegner, died a decade after Stonechild, around when Night survived his dumping.

In spite of claims by the Saskatoon Police Service that the incident with Darrell Night was isolated, Saskatoon Police Chief Russell Sabo admitted in June 2003 that a Saskatoon Police officer was disciplined in 1976 for dumping an Indigenous woman outside of Saskatoon.

=== Strip searches of Inuit women in Nunavut ===
Inuit women have come forward with allegations of police misconduct against the Royal Canadian Mounted Police (RCMP). On June 13, 2019, Benson Cowan, Chief Executive Officer of the Legal Services Board of Nunavut, sent a letter to Michelaine Lahaie, Chairperson of the Civilian Review and Complaints Commission for the RCMP, requesting a review of the police force in Nunavut. A follow-up letter was sent on January 23, 2020, detailing two occurrences of strip searching performed on Inuit women by the Nunavut RCMP. The first involved a woman detained for assault and public intoxication in September 2019. According to the second letter sent to Michelaine Lahaie, the woman was overpowered by three male RCMP officers and stripped against her will while being pressed face-down onto the floor of her holding cell. The officers left her on the ground after the strip search was complete with a mere "suicide gown" draped over her body. The woman then crawled towards her cell door before losing consciousness. In the second incident, a woman was arrested in October 2019 for assault and mischief. The woman was informed that she was required to wear a "suicide gown" as per RCMP policy, but refused. As a result, the woman was forced to walk from the shower to her cell naked, and after a strip search was conducted, she was left in her cell naked. The letter cites video footage that allegedly shows the woman was not resisting police and maintained control of her body without showing visible signs of suicidal or violent ideation.

R. v. Golden, a 2001 Canadian Supreme Court case, set guidelines for constitutional strip search procedures in Canada that are in line with the Canadian Charter of Rights and Freedoms. This case decided that strip searches are inherently degrading and humiliating. The Legal Services Board of Nunavut alleges that the RCMP officers who performed these two occurrences of strip searching were not in compliance with those guidelines.

=== Assault of Allan Adam ===
On March 10, 2020, police vehicle camera footage was captured of Chief Allan Adam of Fort Chipewyan First Nation being tackled to the ground by an RCMP officer. Police had originally approached Adam's vehicle due to an allegedly expired license plate. The RCMP initially declined to publicly release the video footage, but were required to do so after a court order and the video was published June 11, 2020. The officer who tackled Adam allegedly punched him in the head and applied a chokehold once he was on the ground. Adam was later charged with resisting arrest and unlawful assault of a police officer. These charges were later dropped. Adam's wife, Freda Courtoreille, can be seen in the video being restrained briefly by an RCMP officer. Courtoreille was arrested for obstruction as a result of the incident, although charges were never successfully pressed.

=== Shooting death of Chantel Moore ===
Chantel Moore, a member of Tla-o-qui-aht First Nation, was shot and killed in her apartment during a wellness check on June 4, 2020, in New Brunswick. Edmundston police were contacted by Moore's ex-boyfriend following messages sent from Moore's Facebook account suggesting that someone was watching Moore sleep. Moore had been drinking with friends earlier in the evening. Police officers at the scene alleged that Moore was wielding a knife and threatening the officers. The Public Prosecutions Service of New Brunswick, in a news release, stated that criminal charges were not warranted against the officer who shot and killed Moore and that none would be pursued.

Inspector Steve Robinson was accused of smiling and laughing while speaking with a news reporter regarding Moore's death. Robinson was mandated to take an online course on Indigenous Canada, offered through the Faculty of Native Studies at the University of Alberta.

=== Shooting death of Rodney Levi ===
Rodney Levi, a member of Metepenagiag Mi'kmaq Nation on the Miramichi River, was shot and killed by the RCMP on June 12, 2020, in New Brunswick. Police received a complaint regarding a disturbance in a home involving an unwanted individual in possession of knives but with no injuries to anyone involved at that point. The individual in question was identified as Levi, who confirmed to Constable Scott Hait on the scene that he wished to harm himself. Levi informed Hait that he had found the knives on the side of the road. Hait, along with Contable Justin Napke, told Levi to drop the knives but he refused. Napke attempted to electroshock Levi by deploying a taser three times, none of which caused Levi to drop the knives. Hait told a coroner's inquest jury into Levi's death that Levi said, "You're going to have to put a bullet in me." Hait attested that Levi then began to advance towards him, causing him to fire two shots in a range between three and five feet .

On October 5, 2021, forensic suicidologist Greg Zed testified at the coroner's inquest that the incident was a case of suicide by cop. Becky Levi, Levi's niece, informed reporters after Zed's testimony that she did not believe Zed's theory fit her uncle's experience. After hearing from 27 witnesses, the inquest resulted in Levi's death being ruled a homicide. The five-member jury released a set of recommendations under three categories: Recommendations for Aboriginal Policing, Recommendations for Mental Health Services, and Recommendations for RCMP.

=== Shooting death of Julian Jones ===
Julian Jones, a Tla-o-qui-aht man, was shot and killed by Tofino RCMP on February 27, 2021. On the evening of the shooting, two officers arrived at home in Opitsaht in search of a woman believed to be held against her will. Jones was shot and killed, another man was taken into police custody, and the woman for whom the officers were searching was transported to a hospital for a medical assessment.

An Indigenous civilian monitor was selected to review a report completed by British Columbia's police watchdog on the shooting death of Jones. Tla-o-qui-aht Chief Thomas George was granted full access to the report. This was the first decision of its kind to allow an Indigenous civilian monitor to review a case report of this nature. Independent civilian oversight of British Columbia police is managed by the Independent Investigations Office (IIO). The IIO stated that this move was meant to aid in bettering trust between the office and Indigenous peoples in Canada.

=== Shooting of a Tla-o-qui-aht woman in Port Albion ===
A Tla-o-qui-aht woman was shot multiple times by the RCMP on May 8, 2021. Police responded to a domestic disturbance at a home in Port Albion. The woman was reportedly holding a replica gun and was left badly injured from multiple gunshot wounds inflicted by officers on the scene. The Secretary-Treasurer of the Union of B.C. Indian Chiefs Judy Wilson informed The Canadian Press that the victim is a mother of two and suffered gunshot wounds to her spine. Tla-o-qui-aht First Nation Chief Moses Martin revealed through a joint statement with the First Nations Leadership Council on May 11, 2021, that the woman was in critical condition.

Following the deaths of Chantel Moore and Julian Jones, this incident marked the third shooting of a Tla-o-qui-aht individual by the RCMP in the span of eleven months.

== See also ==
- Saskatoon freezing deaths
- Highway of Tears
- List of excessive police force incidents in Canada
