= International Day Against Police Brutality =

The International Day Against Police Brutality occurs on March 15. It first began in 1997 as an initiative of the Montreal-based Collective Opposed to Police Brutality and the Black Flag group in Switzerland. A march is held yearly in Montreal.

Acceptance of March 15 as a focal day of solidarity against police brutality varies from one place to another. In the United States, the October 22 Coalition to Stop Police Brutality, Repression, and the Criminalization of a Generation, a group mounted by the RCP has succeeded in building support for October 22 (also known as O22) as National Anti Police Brutality Day since 1995.

== See also ==
- Copwatch
- Legal observer
- Black Lives Matter
