= Sarah Abbott =

Canadian filmmaker and artist (born 1969)

- Born: 1969 (age 56–57); Montreal, Quebec
- Education: Queen's University
- Occupations: Filmmaker and artist

Sarah Abbott (born in 1969) is a Canadian filmmaker, artist, and actor. Abbott graduated from Queen's University with a major in Film Studies and Drama, she received a Master of Fine Arts degree for Art Video at Syracuse University and is pursuing a doctorate at Royal Roads University for Interdisciplinary Social Sciences. Abbott has been involved in film-making for over 20 years and has received several awards for her work such as the “Saskatchewan Lieutenant Governor’s Arts Award for Arts and Learning” in 2012. Abbott is known for her work in gender and First Nations specific films and for bringing awareness to these issues through her short and experimental films. Abbott was a founding individual involved in the creation of Mispon, an indigenous film festival in held in Regina, Saskatchewan. She is currently employed as an associate professor for the film department at the University of Regina.

== Career ==
Sarah Abbott was born in Montreal, Quebec in 1969. Abbott completed her studies before moving in the 1990s to Toronto, Ontario where she began her career. At this point in time, Abbott was mostly creating short films.

She works primarily on films involving human rights, gender and sexuality studies, and issues pertaining to Indigenous peoples. Themes of films produced by Abbott surrounding Indigenous issues include the culture of First Nations people and the problems that they face in their communities, as well as addressing other social and ethical issues. Many of Abbott's films are experimental - relying on imagery, sound, and voice overs - and are left open for interpretation which allows the viewer to draw their own conclusions and meaning from the work.

Abbott created a short film based on Canadian writer Nancy Jo Cullen's short story of the same name: Why I Hate Bees. In this experimental film, Abbott used the text from the short story to have as narration. Utilizing the filming techniques of optical printing and animation, the film emphasizes the experience of the viewer's senses through sound and colour motifs. The plot focuses on a girl's memories as she retells her childhood near-death experience. The film was well-received and won “Best Lesbian Film” from Inside Out in 1998, the grand prize at the Cabbagetown Film Festival in 1999, and an honourable mention at the Ann Arbor Film Festival in 2000.

For her first documentary film, Tide Marks (2004), Abbott traveled to Cape Town, South Africa to record the residential women's stories and experiences of the apartheid. The film was created to be as objective as possible to ensure an organic and true portrayal of the community and people involved in the project. Although filming was set back by a key testimonial dropping out, Abbott chose to go forward with her work and create the film as it is today.

Abbott is now working at the University of Regina. Abbott started a program at the university that involves hands-on learning for the film students, the students are placed on film sets with qualified film-workers. Abbott incorporated an element of Indigenous studies into this project; the last two student assisted films, Out In The Cold and This Time Last Winter, feature issues affecting First Nations communities within these films.

Abbott's film Out In The Cold was filmed on location in Saskatoon, Saskatchewan and is about the “Starlight Tours”. A “Starlight Tour” is when a police officer picks up an Indigenous citizen under the guise of an arrest or a ride home and instead drops the person off further out into the middle of nowhere, often during freezing temperatures. These “tours” are an alleged practice committed by some members of the Saskatoon police that are being investigated. The film is a black-and-white fictional piece inspired by the death of Neil Stonechild. The main character, Thomas, is driven out of the city limits by police and left to walk home in below freezing weather. The young man meets the specters of two men, one malevolent and the other benevolent, who had previously died from being left in similar conditions. Out in the Cold was created to call attention to the potential crimes committed - the Starlight Tours - and create conversations about the mistreatment of First Nations by police and government officials. For this film Abbott received the Mayor's Arts and Business Award for Innovation in the Arts in 2009.

== Filmography ==
Year	Name of Film	FilmType	Role in Production
1991	My Withered Tomato Friend	Experimental	Director
1997	Why I Hate Bees	Experimental / Short	Director / Writer / Producer
1997	Froglight	Experimental	Director / Writer / Producer
1997	The Light In Our Lizard Bellies	Experimental	Director / Writer / Producer / Cinematographer
2000	Rug	Experimental	Director
2001	My Heart the Lunchbox	Compilation	Cinematographer
2001	My Heart the Prophet	Compilation	Director / Writer
2001	Looking Back to See	Experimental	Director / Writer
2002	Here	Experimental	Director / Writer / Producer
2002	Patching	Experimental	Director
2002	Knee Level	Fictional	Director / Writer / Producer
2004	Tide Marks	Documentary	Director / Writer / Producer / Cinematographer
2007	Out in the Cold	Fictional	Producer
2010	This Time Last Winter	Narrative	Writer / Producer
2011	In the Minds of All Beings: Tsogyal Latso of Tibet	Documentary / Short	Director / Writer / Cinematographer

== Awards and nominations ==
Year	Name of the Award	Name of Film
1992	Canadian International Amateur Film Festival: One Star Award (winner)	My Withered Tomato Friend
1998	Inside Out: Best Canadian Lesbian Short (winner)	Why I Hate Bees
1999	Cabbagetown Film Festival (grand prize)	Why I Hate Bees
2000	Ann Arbor Film Festival (honourable mention)	Why I Hate Bees
2000	Ann Arbor Film Festival (honourable mention)	Froglight
2000	Ann Arbor Film Festival (honourable mention)	The Light in Our Lizard Bellies
2009	The City of Regina's Mayor's Arts and Business Award for Innovation in the Arts (winner)	Out in the Cold
2010	Winnipeg Aboriginal Film Festival: Best Actress (Recipient: Danna Henderson)	This Time Last Winter
2012	Saskatchewan Lieutenant Governor's Arts Award (winner)	-
2014	Vanier Canadian Graduate Scholarship (winner)	-
