= List of excessive force police incidents in Canada =

This is a list of incidents involving proven excessive force by law enforcement in Canada.

== Alberta ==
- 1999: An RCMP constable in Alberta, Michael Ferguson, fatally shot Darren Varley after Varley attacked him in a jail cell. He was convicted of manslaughter in 2004, allowed to serve it under house arrest till 2006 and paroled in 2007, after two months in jail. The trial judge had decided the mandatory minimum sentence of four years in prison would be cruel and unusual punishment in his case. However, that decision was overturned by the Court of Appeal, which imposed the minimum sentence of four years in prison. The Court of Appeal`s decision was upheld on further appeal to the Supreme Court.
- December 18, 2009: On September 13, 2009, Const. Desmond Sandboe violently assaulted prisoner Andrew Clyburn in the Lac La Biche detention facility. Apparently, the attack began when Clyburn corrected Sandboe for mispronouncing his name. Clyburn says that he suffers from memory loss and breathing problems from the beating.
- November 8, 2012: Const. Jason Clace pulled over a vehicle in the town of Boyle following a highway chase on September 23, 2011. During the stop, Clace pulled his weapon and shot one of the two suspects. The victim was taken to the hospital with non-life-threatening injuries.
- July 3, 2015: Robert Angstadt and two other officers took James Halco into custody on August 25, 2012. Angstadt was convicted of assault.
- June 4, 2015: Const. Sean Briegal was criminally convicted of assault causing bodily harm for breaking an intoxicated man's eye socket while attempting to remove him from a store on March 8, 2014.
- October 5, 2016: In 2018, Const. James Othen was convicted for his role in the 2016 arrest of Clayton Prince. Prince had been pulled over for a traffic stop on Macleod Trail after leaving the Chasing Summer music festival with his girlfriend. Instead of complying with the officer's demands for him to stay in the car, Prince said he took off because he was paranoid after taking cocaine and marijuana and had been driving without a license. After Prince had been captured and was complying with officers, Othen began his attack. Prince's ribs were broken, and one of his lungs collapsed. Several officers testified for the prosecution; they described the arrest as "out of control" and "extremely excessive."
- March 29, 2017: In the early morning of May 1, 2016, Red Deer RCMP officer Jason Tress (now no longer on the force) responded to a 911 call reporting a domestic dispute at an apartment. Tress took the 19-year-old female witness into the bedroom and closed the door. He commented on her breasts and asked whether they were real or fake. After making the comments, Tress stood in front of the bedroom door for a period of time before allowing the woman to leave. He was found guilty in September 2019 on a count of breach of trust and acquitted of sexual assault with a weapon.
- June 9, 2019: Const. Licio Soares had arrested Vernon Laboucan, who was intoxicated at the time, for mischief. Security video shows Laboucan taking his shirt off in the detention facility and throwing it at Soares. Soares then pulled the shirt over Laboucan's head and forced him to the ground. He then tackled Laboucan, punched him in the head, kneed him in the back, and pushed his head to the ground. Soares was sentenced to 15 months' probation,150 hours of community service to be served at an institution or charity that serves Indigenous populations in Alberta, and 10 hours of instruction related to the difficulties faced by Indigenous peoples at the hands of the RCMP.

== British Columbia ==
- 1918: Dominion Police Special Constable Dan Campbell shot and killed Ginger Goodwin, a popular radical who was avoiding conscription. The killing inspired the 1918 Vancouver general strike.
- 2007: Robert Dziekański, a Polish immigrant, was taken into police custody at Vancouver International Airport and died after being tasered a total of five times by a group of four RCMP officers. Police were heavily criticized for their handling of the incident, and the incident revived debate concerning police use of tasers in Canada. Const. Kwesi Millington, the RCMP officer who fired a Taser the night Robert Dziekanski died at Vancouver International Airport, has been sentenced to 30 months in prison for perjury and colluding with his fellow officers at an inquiry into the death.
- February 2012: Jordan Dyck, a passenger at a Vancouver SkyTrain station, was physically assaulted and pepper-sprayed by two Metro Vancouver Transit Police officers. In 2015, the two officers were found guilty of assault.
- July 18, 2015: Hudson Brooks was involved in an altercation with 2 police officers and was shot 9 times and killed by Constable Elizabeth Cucheran. Brooks was unarmed and clad only in boxer shorts at the time.
- In August 2015, Myles Gray died after being beaten by 9 police officers. Mr Gray suffered a fractured voice box, nasal fracture, dislocated jaw, a fractured right orbital eye socket, a fractured rib, fractured sternum, hemorrhagic injury to one testicle, and multifocal bruising to his thigh and right arm. Getting the police to co-operate in the investigation has proven difficult as a number of the involved officers have so far refused (April 2018) to provide testimony. Since there were no other witnesses other than the six officers and no body cams, it has been a challenge for the family to find out what happened. The family has launched a multimillion-dollar civil suit.
- February 11, 2018: In the early hours of February 11th, Jamiel Moore-Williams was arrested by Vancouver police officers for alleged jaywalking and obstruction of justice violations. Video captured by bystanders shows several police officers forcing Moore-Williams to the ground, who he alleges proceeded to kick him in his head and body while tasering him "seven to 14 times at close range." Two Vancouver police officers have been criminally charged in connection with the arrest, and the charges against Moore-Williams have been stayed.
- January 20, 2020: Surveillance footage shows Mona Wang, a 20-year-old nursing student (who was seemingly unconscious), being dragged down the halls of her student apartment complex in Kelowna by RCMP officer Cst. Lacy Browning. Footage also shows Browning stepping on Wang's head. Wang was having mental health issues, and her boyfriend called the RCMP to do a wellness check. When Cst. Browning arrived, Wang had ingested wine and medication, and had self-harmed with a box cutter. Wang alleges Cst. Browning used excessive force during the check, at one point kicking Wang in the stomach and punching her and leaving her with bruises on her face, while shouting at her, "to stop being so dramatic." Wang has filed a civil suit against the RCMP. Cst. Lacy Browning was charged with one count of assault in August 2021. Cst. Browning pleaded guilty to the charge on November 7, 2022. She has yet to be sentenced.

== Manitoba ==
- 1919: In the face of major unrest during the Winnipeg General Strike, the Royal North-West Mounted Police charged on horseback into a crowd of strikers on June 21, beating them with clubs and firing weapons. This violent action resulted in many injuries and the deaths of two strikers. The day came to be known as "Bloody Saturday".
- May 22, 2014: Members of the Winnipeg Police Service arrested and detained Christopher Chastellaine, 40, after receiving a complaint that he had spat on a liquor store employee. While in the police holding cell, he headbutted a police officer who tried to confiscate his clothing for evidence. Six officers restrained, handcuffed, and hooded him during the ensuing physical altercation. He became unresponsive and died of a delirium-induced heart attack in the hospital on May 26. An inquest into whether officers should have taken his clothes was held.
- November 21, 2015: Thompson RCMP officer, Const. Abram Letkeman used excessive force on Steven Campbell during an unauthorized car chase, resulting in the death of Steven Campbell. The RCMP officer, acting alone, attempted to pull over Campbell with 3 passengers in the vehicle due to expected intoxication. The officer used untrained maneuvers to knock the car off the dirt road, causing two separate collisions and causing injury to one of the passengers, Lori Flett. After the second collision, the officer did not wait for backup before stepping out of the vehicle, firearm drawn. Campbell accelerated towards the officer, in the officer shot 11 rounds at Campbell, where he was struck 8 times, and he died due to injuries on the scene. Abram Letkeman was charged with criminal negligence in 2019 concerning the case, though he was acquitted of charges of manslaughter related to the shooting. Letkeman resigned following the trial, and He was sentenced to pay a $10,000 fine and given three years' probation, but the Crown appealed the sentence at Manitoba's top court, which overturned it and replaced it with a term of incarceration. Letkeman has already served his incarceration.
- Aug 9, 2017: Winnipeg officers used excessive force on Richard Kakish during an arrest. Kakish later died days later due to his spleen being ruptured, broken ribs, and a head injury from police kicking/punching him repeatedly. An inquest was called for in 2018 to determine who was to be held accountable.
- April 9, 2020: Jason Collins was shot by Winnipeg officers at his own home. Police responded to a domestic violence with a gunman 911 call that originated from Collins' home. On arriving, the police heard a woman scream in distress and found Collins brandishing a gun. Police left the house, and 40 minutes after their initial arrival, an officer shot Collins while he confronted them from his front door.

== New Brunswick ==
- July 2, 2021: Const. Pierrick Caron of the Campbellton RCMP was recorded by a passerby punching André Mercier, a Campbellton man, on the ground during an arrest outside of a Tim Hortons. Caron was later found guilty of assault by Judge Brigitte Sivret of the Provincial Court on February 28, 2024, who added that Caron used a "disproportionate and unreasonable" amount of force.

== Ontario ==
- December 8, 1988: 17-year-old Michael Wade Lawson was shot to death by two Peel Regional Police Constables. Anthony Melaragni, No. 1192, and Darren Longpre, No. 1139, were both charged with second-degree murder and aggravated assault after a preliminary hearing; both were later acquitted by a jury. The officers claimed that the stolen vehicle driven by Lawson was approaching the officers head-on in a threatening manner, and they then discharged their firearms. An autopsy conducted by the Ontario Coroner's Office showed that the unarmed teenager was struck by a hollow-point bullet to the back of the head. This type of bullet was considered illegal at the time, as hollow-point bullets were not authorized for use by police officers in Ontario.
- 2009: Two police detectives got into a fight with members of the Khan family in Toronto. They brought an action against the family for assault, but the judge acquitted the Khans in 2013, stating that the officers had used excessive force and fabricated evidence.
- 2010: Mass protests at the G-20 Toronto summit turned violent on June 26 when some demonstrators used black bloc tactics, leading to widespread property damage. Tear gas was used for the first time in the history of Toronto, being deployed in a few locations by muzzle blasts. Rubber bullets and pepper spray were also used against many protesters. Three protestors were confirmed by the Toronto EMS to be injured during the protests, and journalists were among the people who were beaten. Const. Babak Andalib-Goortani, the Toronto police officer accused of using excessive force during the arrest of G20 protester Adam Nobody, has been convicted of assault with a weapon for his role.
- November 2010: In Barrie, a man was beaten by a police officer outside a mall. The beating was captured on surveillance camera, and occurred after the victim's friend broke a Christmas ornament. The officer was found guilty of assault, obstruction of justice, and fabricating evidence, and was sentenced to one year in jail and one year of probation.
- January 15, 2011: A man was stopped by police, punched in the face twice, and had his pockets searched by a Toronto police officer. The victim sued Toronto Police Service for assault, battery, unlawful arrest, and violation of his Charter rights. In 2015, Justice Frederick Myers awarded the victim $27,000 and stated that he, a man of African descent, was racially profiled by the officer.
- July 27, 2013: Sammy Yatim was shot eight times and killed by Toronto Police officer James Forcillo, after he brandished a knife on an empty streetcar. In 2016, Forcillo was found guilty of attempted murder and not guilty of murder.
- July 2016: Abdirahman Abdi died while being arrested by the Ottawa Police. Witnesses claim he was struck in the head with batons, pepper-sprayed, and wrestled to the ground. The officer was charged in 2017 with manslaughter, aggravated assault, and assault with a weapon.
- July 2017: Toronto Police officer Constable Michael Theriault was charged with assault for the December 2016 assault of Dafonte Miller, a 19-year old Black male, with a pipe that led to removal of his eye. In 2020, the court found Theriault guilty and sentenced him to 9 months in prison, along with 12 months probation afterwards.

== Saskatchewan ==
- c. 1976 – c. 2000: Members of the Saskatoon Police Service engaged in what have been called "starlight tours", where officers would take an Indigenous person to the edge of the city in the dead of winter and abandon them there with little to no clothing. The earliest known case happened in 1976 and the latest known case happened in 2000.

== See also ==
- List of controversies involving the Royal Canadian Mounted Police
- List of incidents of civil unrest in Canada
- Collective Opposed to Police Brutality, an autonomous group founded in Montreal in 1995
- "Police Brutality in Canada : A Bibliography of Books, Reports, & Magazine, Journal and Newspaper Articles". 1982.
- Krista Stelkia (15 July 2020). ""Police Brutality in Canada: A Symptom of Structural Racism and Colonial Violence"".
