= Collective Opposed to Police Brutality =

Organisation

Collective Opposed to Police Brutality (C.O.P.B.)
- Collectif Opposé à la Brutalité Policière
- Abbreviation: C.O.P.B. / C.O.B.P.
- Formation: 1995; 31 years ago
- Founded at: Montreal, Quebec, Canada
- Type: Autonomous group
- Legal status: Unregistered (not a registered charity)
- Location: Montreal, Canada
- Region served: Montreal region
- Methods: Copwatch, workshops, victim support, demonstrations
- Main organ: International Day Against Police Brutality (March 15)
- Publication: Guess what! We've got Rights?!
- Funding: Member donations

Collective Opposed to Police Brutality (C.O.P.B.), also known as Collectif Opposé à la Brutalité Policière, is an autonomous group founded in Montreal in 1995. This organization consists of victims, witnesses, representatives of ethnic communities, marginalized youth, small political groups, the homeless, sex workers, LGBTQ+, drug users, and others who have questions about police authority.

== History ==
The C.O.P.B was founded in 1995 following a protest regarding abortion rights. The protest occurred on August 19, 1995, when Human Life International (HLI), a Catholic pro-life organization, visited Montreal, Quebec. An anti-HLI demonstration was organized by a coalition of nearly 2,500 people, including those representing eighty separate organizations. Of the thousands of demonstrators, many were arrested, including the soon-to-be founders of the C.O.P.B.

C.O.P.B's committee concentrates its efforts in the Montreal region and the collective's work includes: informing people of their rights, lending support to victims of police brutality by helping them file complaints in the police ethics system, and dealing with wrongful accusations. The collective also denounces harassment, violence, intimidation, arrests, and abuse of power by police.

C.O.P.B. has a history rife with police repression due to their hard-line stance against police brutality, as well as their refusal to denounce the varied ways that victims of police violence express their resistance.

== Mission statement ==
=== Raising Awareness of Rights ===
The C.O.B.P does regular workshops and discussions on rights and police abuse. Since 1998 the organization has distributed over 35,000 of their booklets entitled 'Guess what! We've got Rights?!', which lists the rights a person has when dealing with police officers of the SPVM (Service de Police de la Ville de Montreal). The information contained in the booklets is based on Canadian laws as well as on the rules and regulations applying to police forces in Quebec.

=== Support Victims ===
C.O.B.P intervenes when people are unaware of their rights, helping with the steps required to obtain justice in cases of police brutality. The group encourages victim testimonials to illustrate how people have suffered from police brutality, so other victims know they are not alone. The victim testimonials which are in video or written format can be helpful in providing justice to the victims of police brutality. The testimonials also serve to expand support for the organization in making police brutality a global issue.

=== Denouncing harassment, violence, intimidation and abuse ===
Another objective of the organization is to monitor the occurrence of violence. The C.O.B.P launched a copwatch program in 1997. The program provides the necessary knowledge and rights that individuals and groups have while in the presence of police forces. The C.O.B.P copwatch programs intentions are to document police misconduct in the hopes that general awareness will reduce the risk of police violence.

The C.O.B.P offers copwatch workshops where they recommend tips for beginner, intermediate and advanced copwatchers, while also explaining the rights people have when copwatching, as well as what behaviors' is considered abusive. These workshops are free to the public and intend to promote rights that are available when confronted with police brutality.,

== Current Activities ==
=== International Day Against Police Brutality ===
The International Day Against Police Brutality is the main initiative put forth by the COBP. It was first introduced in 1997 in conjunction with the Black Flags organization in Switzerland. The events take place on March 15 of each year in commemoration of everyone who has suffered at the hands of police brutality. The 2002 Montreal protest resulted in over 350 arrests. This constituted one of the largest mass arrests in Quebec history. The Canadian cities that take part in the IDAPB (International Day Against Police Brutality) demonstrations are Belleville, Calgary, Guelph, Trois-Rivières, Toronto, Montreal, Winnipeg and Vancouver. Outside of Canada, IDAPB events have taken place in Argentina, France, Mexico, Switzerland, the United Kingdom, the United States amongst other countries.

The C.O.B.P organizes the protest in Montreal every year. Out of the 1500 protests that take place each year in Montreal, the March Against Police Brutality is one of many in which organizers refuse to inform the police of their demonstration route beforehand. Key events in recent years that have influenced C.O.B.P organizers of the IDAPB protest in Montreal include:

- Shooting of Fredy Villanueva by a Montreal police officer in August 2008.
- Farshad Mohammadi, a 34-year-old homeless man was shot by a Montreal police officer at the downtown Bonaventure metro station on the afternoon of Friday, Jan 6th 2012.
- Shooting of mentally ill Mario Hamel and passerby Patrick Lemoges.
- On February 16, Jean-François Nadreau was killed by a Montreal police officer in an apartment on Nicolet street. His girlfriend had called 911 because he was in crisis.
- 60 people who died during police interventions in Montreal since 1987.

== Mainstream Media IDAPB ==
When considering the International Day Against Police Brutality, mainstream media offers event based news coverage and editorial content, focusing on arrests, disorders, accounts of the day's actions. It also provides many stories from primary definers, such as police and municipal officials who often project a seeming and somewhat self-sustaining public consensus which casts the protest as airing a valid concern but as incoherent and misguided in its tactics.,

== Alternative Media IDAPB ==
Alternative coverage tends to be more sympathetic to the aims of the C.O.B.P, with reports on their efforts more often found within activist blogs, social networks, video and picture uploads and both student run and local weekly newspapers. Student run newspapers are viewed as alternative by providing factual reporting otherwise unavailable, as well as furnishing efforts at interpretation indicating an examination of power dynamics. The alternative viewpoint is more often aligned with the goals and objectives of the organization than mainstream accounts.,

== Organization ==
=== Funding ===
The COPB is funded by donations made by its members and anyone who wishes to donate to the cause of eliminating police brutality. The organization is not a registered charity within the federal or provincial charity act. The group officials work secretively and do not release personal information to the public. This information remains secretive due to the violent outcomes of many of the organized protests, such as the IDAPB protest, as well as the fear of criminal repercussions against the initiative and its members.
