= Rotary Museum of Police and Corrections =

- Established: 1985
- Location: Prince Albert, Saskatchewan, Canada
- Coordinates: 53.178998°N 105.758931°W
- Type: Police Museum
- Website: Rotary Museum of Police and Corrections

The Rotary Museum of Police and Corrections is a museum in Prince Albert, Saskatchewan, Canada.

== Overview ==
The museum covers the history of law enforcement in early Prince Albert and Saskatchewan. The museum is located in the original guardroom of the first Royal Canadian Mounted Police (RCMP) depot in Prince Albert. The building was built around 1888 and in 1985 it opened as a museum. It was modified inside using real prison bars from the original Prince Albert police station. The museum is operated by the Prince Albert Historical Society.

== Collections ==
The museum has artifacts from the RCMP, Prince Albert City Police, provincial correctional facilities, the Saskatchewan Federal Penitentiary, and the Saskatchewan Provincial Police. Exhibits include RCMP and Prince Albert City Police uniforms, and a Thompson submachine gun, or "Tommy Gun" which was used by the Saskatchewan Provincial Police. Also on display are weapons made by inmates including a zip gun, shanks, two sawed-off shotguns, as well as other items such as masks and an alcohol still made from a fire extinguisher. Various methods of discipline which were used at the Federal Penitentiary are also exhibited, for example a rack, a cat-o-nine tails, and a paddling table.

== Affiliations ==
The museum is affiliated with: CMA, CHIN, and Virtual Museum of Canada.

== See also ==
- Saskatoon Police Service
- RCMP Heritage Centre, Regina, Saskatchewan
- Vancouver Police Centennial Museum
- Winnipeg Police Museum
