= Antonio Buehler =

American police accountability activist

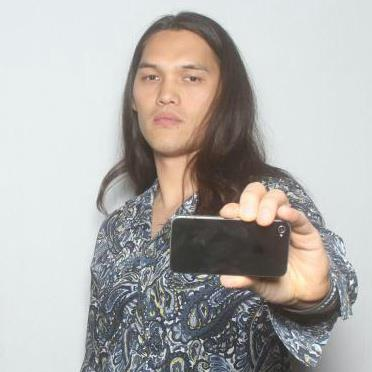
- Antonio Buehler
- Born: June 11, 1977 (age 49); Fayetteville, North Carolina
- Education: United States Military Academy at West Point; Stanford Graduate School of Business; Harvard Graduate School of Education
- Occupation: Educator
- Known for: Abrome; Peaceful Streets Project
- Website: peacefulstreets.com

Antonio Buehler is an American educator, entrepreneur, and activist known for his work on police accountability and his pursuit of a more widely recognized constitutional right to photograph, film and document the public activities of police. In 2012, Buehler was arrested in Austin, Texas, for video-recording police after he allegedly witnessed a woman being abused by officers. After the arrest, Buehler co-founded the Peaceful Streets Project, an organization that trains the public to record police activity. Buehler has been arrested a total of seven times, has had twelve criminal charges filed against him, and has had dozens of criminal investigations initiated against him.

== Early life, education, and experience ==
Antonio Buehler was born in Fayetteville, North Carolina, in 1977. He attended Pottsville Area High School in Pottsville, Pennsylvania, where he was an All-Anthracite football player. Buehler graduated from the United States Military Academy at West Point and later from the Stanford Graduate School of Business and the Harvard Graduate School of Education. Buehler also served in the Iraq War.

== Alternative education ==
Buehler has given numerous talks on college admissions, alternative education, homeschooling and other education topics at schools, libraries, and conferences across the country.

In 2014, Buehler launched Abrome. Initially, Abrome was an online education service, but as of 2016 it is now an alternative, progressive school in Austin, TX, that operates free of teachers, classrooms, testing, homework, or grades. Abrome claims to have gotten approximately 50% of their clients into Harvard and/or Stanford Universities, and 75% of their clients into a top ten college.

== New Year's Day 2012 incident ==
In the early hours of New Year's Day 2012, Buehler, the designated driver that night, pulled into a 7-11 in Austin, TX for gas. While fueling up, he and his passenger observed a DWI stop in progress, with a woman in high heels, the driver of the automobile, being subjected to a field sobriety test being conducted by an Austin police officer; according to Buehler, they then heard a female screaming and turned in time to see officer Robert Snider forcefully pulling another female from the passenger side of the vehicle, throwing her to the ground and pinning her arms behind her back. Buehler yelled out to the police, asking them why they were assaulting her. After twisting her arms behind her back, the officers arrested her. Officer Patrick Oborski then approached Buehler, pushed him forcefully several times in the chest, and arrested him. Oborski later claimed Buehler spat on him, a felony charge that carries up to a 10-year prison sentence. Witness video evidence does not show Buehler spitting, Oborski did not wipe his face, and Austin Police Department (APD) spokesman Corporal Hipolito admitted to KEYE news that he could not see Buehler spitting on the officer.

I don't feel vindicated, nor do I think I 'won.' The cops who committed crimes that night were never tried, arrested, fired, disciplined, or even reprimanded. Instead, Norma and I were charged with a total of six crimes we did not commit, and it took nearly three years to make them disappear. And I still have three more trials coming up for the 'crime' of filming the police. The city had eight prosecutors in the courtroom trying this case, and about a dozen police officers were in there to intimidate the jury. When cops and prosecutors are willing to expend such tremendous resources to prosecute a Class C Misdemeanor for political purposes, all Americans should fear their government.

— Antonio Buehler, following his acquittal on October 29, 2014, "after four days of proceedings and more than five hours of jury deliberation"

After an online appeal by Buehler to find witnesses to the event, several witnesses came forward and a videorecording of the incident surfaced. APD has yet to release the dashcam videos from Oborski or Snider's vehicles to the public. Nearly 8,200 people have joined the Free Antonio Buehler Facebook page, with supporters flyering the city and organizing rallies in support of Buehler, and posting daily stories of American and international police abuse.

Despite a half dozen witnesses, two videos and audio evidence of what happened on New Year's Day, the District Attorney did not convene a grand jury in 2012. His grand jury date was then postponed numerous times. The grand jury finally convened on March 5, 6 and 7, 2013. Four weeks later, the District Attorney finally informed the public that the grand jury failed to indict Antonio Buehler on any of the crimes with which he was charged.

They instead indicted him on four Class C misdemeanors. Three for "failure to obey a lawful order" related to his New Year's Day incident, and two follow on arrests. The fourth indictment was for "interfering" in an incident in which he was never arrested. The grand jury also indicted Norma Pizana for resisting arrest. Pizana is the woman that Buehler felt was being abused on New Year's Day 2012.

October 29, 2014, after an unprecedented four-day Class C Misdemeanor trial that spanned a full calendar week, Buehler was acquitted of charges and found not guilty of failing to comply with the order of a police officer on New Year's Day 2012." The trial was unique not only in its duration, but also in the resources invested into it by the state; the state had eight prosecutors in the courtroom and over a dozen police officers.

=== Civil rights lawsuits ===
On December 31, 2013, Buehler, while awaiting trial, sued the Austin Police Department, Police Chief Art Acevedo, Officer Patrick Oborski, Officer Robert Snider, SGT Adam Johnson and Officer Justin Berry for allegedly violating his civil rights beginning with his January 1, 2012, arrest and two additional arrests which occurred on August 26 and September 21, 2012.

We're in this for the long haul. And we're hopeful that it will eventually set a precedent that will prevent people from losing their right to hold the government and police accountable just because the prosecution convinces the grand jury to indict the individual on a bogus misdemeanor that the prosecution can't even win.

— Antonio Buehler, after announcing plans to appeal the dismissal of his civil lawsuit

On June 2, 2014, the National Press Photographers Association filed an Amicus Brief in support of Buehler's civil lawsuit.

On July 24, 2014, Federal Judge Mark Lane denied motions by the City of Austin to dismiss the case, finding that private citizens have the right to record officers in public places as they perform their official duties. Lane also said the officers were not personally immune from allegations that they had arrested and searched him without probable cause.

On February 20, 2015, Judge Mark Lane dismissed the lawsuit based on a Fifth Circuit precedent which stated that an indicted defendant lost their standing to sue. In response to the dismissal, Buehler stated, “We have waited three years for justice, and we are willing to wait even longer to expose APD for the crime they have covered up.” He also noted that the Fifth Circuit precedent provided an incentive for prosecutors to protect corrupt and criminal law enforcement officers through the simple expedient of indicting an otherwise innocent defendant. Buehler and his attorney appealed the decision on February 25, 2015.

On June 2, 2016, the Fifth Circuit Court in New Orleans upheld Judge Mark Lane's decision to dismiss Buehler's lawsuit against the City of Austin and four Austin Police officers.

On December 2, 2016, Buehler filed a petition for a writ of certiorari to have the case heard by the Supreme Court of the United States.

On January 4, 2017, the National Association for Public Defense, Cato Institute, National Press Photographers Association, and five media organizations filed Amicus briefs in support of Buehler's petition to the Supreme Court.

On February 2, 2017, SCOTUSblog, the leading Supreme Court news site, listed Buehler's lawsuit as the Petition of the Day.

The Supreme Court ultimately did not grant a writ of certiorari for Buehler's suit.

On August 2, 2017, Buehler sued the City of Austin and Austin Police Department employees Randy Dear, Aljoe Garibay, Quint Sebek, Wesley Devries, John Leo Coffey, Monika McCoy, Ryan Adam, Allen Hicks, and Reginald Parker for allegedly violating his civil rights and stemming from his August 2, 2015, arrest in downtown Austin.

== Peaceful Streets Project ==
In the months following the incident, a group of activists from a range of backgrounds joined Buehler to start the Peaceful Streets Project, an all-volunteer, nonpartisan, grassroots effort for police accountability. The group holds free community trainings on knowing your rights during police encounters, and held a day-long Police Accountability Summit in Austin, TX on July 14, 2012, where they handed out 100 handheld video-cameras to trained activists who now actively film police encounters with residents of Austin. The Peaceful Streets Project has also stepped up efforts to work with and ally with other community organizations, and have participated in protests in solidarity with victims of police abuse nationally. The Peaceful Streets Project has a "Strong" social media presence with over 5,100 YouTube subscribers, over 4,300 followers on Twitter and over 20,400 likes on Facebook.

Buehler's efforts to expose what he considers to be police violence and the inherent corruption of the justice system have resulted in numerous bloggers taking up his cause. In addition, numerous cities around the country reached out to Buehler and the Peaceful Streets Project looking to set up local franchises. Peaceful Streets Project chapters were set up in nearly a dozen cities to include Houston, Dallas-Fort Worth, New York City, Manchester, Honolulu, San Antonio and Eunice, LA. Buehler and the Peaceful Streets Project decided to stop supporting Peaceful Streets Projects in other cities due to concerns over the politics of the people leading those efforts.

Buehler has continued to wage a public fight against his criminal charges. He has claimed that the city and the Austin Police Department are intentionally engaged in a cover-up and that corruption runs throughout the city government and the police department.

On June 24, 2013, Fox 7 ran a piece on Antonio Buehler wherein the President of the Austin Police Association alluded to possible violence in the future should Buehler continue to escalate his cop watching tactics. The Peaceful Streets Project responded by organizing several more public cop watch events, Know Your Rights Trainings and a national police accountability summit in Austin on August 17, 2013.

On April 12, 2014, Buehler spoke about the Peaceful Streets Project and police abuse at a TEDx event at Harvard.

On January 22, 2015, CBS News highlighted Antonio Buehler and the Peaceful Streets Project as one of two copwatch groups patrolling in Texas.

On May 9, 2015, Reveal from The Center for Investigative Reporting and The Texas Tribune released collaborative pieces on the direct action tactic of Filming the Police, with a focus on the Peaceful Streets Project.

On August 20, 2015, CityLab from The Atlantic released a piece centered on Antonio Buehler and the Peaceful Streets Project about the risks of filming the police, despite the legality of doing so.

On November 25, 2015, Playboy did a longform article on cop watching, which opened and closed with Antonio Buehler and the Peaceful Streets Project.

On February 26, 2016, Pivot.TV's Truth and Power docuseries built an episode around Buehler's history and work with the Peaceful Streets Project.

On March 10, 2016, Showtime's DarkNet docuseries featured Buehler and the Peaceful Streets Project.

In December 2017, The Progressive featured Buehler and his work with the Peaceful Streets Project and Abrome in a three-page feature.

== Subsequent arrests and charges ==
=== August 24, 2012 ===
In the early morning hours of August 24, 2012, while cop watching with members of the Peaceful Streets Project in downtown Austin, Buehler recorded an undercover officer, Justin Berry, helping uniformed police officers arrest women for underage drinking. Although Buehler wasn't arrested for filming Berry, he was later indicted on a Class C Misdemeanor charge of "interference with public duties." Buehler was scheduled to stand trial on January 6, 2015. On January 2, 2015, the City of Austin requested the trial judge dismiss all charges against Buehler.

=== August 26, 2012 ===
In the early morning hours of August 26, 2012, while cop watching with members of the Peaceful Streets Project in downtown Austin, Buehler was arrested by Officer Justin Berry for "interfering with public duties" while recording an arrest. He was released about 17 hours later. Austin Police Department claims that he refused to back away from an arrest, causing the suspect of the arrest to become uncontrollable. Buehler claims that APD was targeting him. APD refused to return Buehler's camera to him after the incident, claiming that it was of evidentiary value. Another member of the Peaceful Streets Project was able to videorecord the arrest and posted it online before Buehler was released from jail. Buehler was scheduled to stand trial on February 23, 2015. On February 19, 2015, the City of Austin requested the trial judge dismiss all remaining charges against Buehler.

=== September 12, 2012 ===
In the early morning hours of September 21, 2012, while cop watching with members of the Peaceful Streets Project in downtown Austin, Buehler was again arrested, this time with fellow police accountability activist Sarah Dickerson Video indicates that both Buehler and Dickerson were silently filming and were further back than APD's self-described desired distance from a scene. According to Buehler and other witnesses, after refusing an order to walk toward the arresting officer and the suspect in order to join other members of the Peaceful Street Project, and despite continually asking how far he needed to move back, and continuing to move back away from the scene, Buehler was given an ultimatum to either join other members of the Peaceful Streets Project, or leave. When Buehler said he was leaving, he was arrested. As Dickerson filmed Buehler's arrest, she too was arrested. Both were charged with "interfering with public duties." Austin Police Department confiscated both Buehler and Dickerson's cameras and have not yet returned them. This most recent arrest has drawn the ire of the National Press Photographers Association which sent a letter to Austin Police Chief Art Acevedo criticizing the actions of APD toward those who film police.

=== March 13, 2013 ===
On March 13, 2013, Buehler was arrested for disorderly conduct in Gonzales, Texas, for telling a police officer to "go fuck yourself." On June 5, 2013, Buehler defended himself pro se. After a seven-hour trial, the jury found him guilty and assessed a $1 fine. Buehler was awarded a new trial which began on February 23, 2015, at Gonzales County Court. A mistrial was declared due to an error on the judge's part, which was caught by defense counsel. A new appeal trial was scheduled for March 30, 2015. That trial was postponed at the request of the prosecutor. A new trial was then scheduled for May 20, 2015. That trial was postponed after the court informed the defense that they had forgotten to send out jury summonses. The next trial date was set for June 25, 2015. On June 25, 2015, after a trial in which the prosecution only called one witness, and the defense called a half dozen, the jury deadlocked at 3-3 and the Judge declared a mistrial. A few weeks later, the prosecutor requested that the charge be dismissed because he would be "[u]nable to prove case beyond a reasonable doubt." In a statement, Buehler stated, “It has become clear to me that in order for people to see justice within the system, they need to have tremendous resources in terms of connections, finances, and time.”

I think this would have been a great opportunity for people to once again see how the Austin Police Department and city prosecutors use city ordinances to victimize people who have already been victimized by the police. It also would have opened people's eyes to how corrupt the grand jury process can be.

— Antonio Buehler, following the first dismissal on January 5, 2015

=== Austin, TX charges dropped ===
Between jury trials scheduled for January and February 2015, the outstanding criminal charges stemming from the August 24, 2015, August 26, 2015, and September 21, 2015, incidents were dropped. On January 5, 2015, the state's motion to drop one set of charges was accepted. The final set of charges pending against Buehler were similarly dropped on February 19, 2015, "clearing the way for a meeting between city prosecutors and the police accountability activist in federal court" on March 2, 2015. On February 20, one day after the last of the charges were dropped, "Judge Mark Lane dismissed Buehler's federal civil lawsuit against the Austin Police Department and its officers."

=== August 2, 2015 ===
On August 2, 2015, Buehler was cop watching with members of the Peaceful Streets Project and Film the Police-Portland in downtown Austin. At multiple points throughout the night, Austin Police officers approached him and told him to step back while he was filming them. At approximately 1:45 a.m., SGT Randy Dear called his subordinate officers into a huddle, and when he emerged he approached Buehler again and told him that "the next time we go to a disturbance and y'all get in the way ... the next time you're interfering, you're going to be arrested." When Buehler asked for a clarification on how what the cop watchers were doing qualified as interference, Dear said, "You've been warned, sir." Buehler then turned to CPL Quint Sebek and Officer Aljoe Garibay to get clarification, and Sebek responded by filming Buehler with his phone, and Garibay stated that Buehler was interfering by being in their way when they were rushing toward disturbances. Dear then came back, positioned himself inches away from Buehler, and ignored Buehler. A little over one minute later, Dear turned to Buehler and told him that he had to step back because they were about to go on patrol. While protesting what he believed was an illegal order, Buehler stepped away from Dear, but was still arrested. He was later charged with "interference with public duties" and "resisting arrest." As Buehler was trying to hand off his cameras to other Peaceful Streets Project members, Mike "Bluehair" Smith from Film the Police-Portland was also arrested for "interference with public duties." In the days following the arrest, Buehler and the Peaceful Streets Project publicly disputed the claims made by the Austin Police Department. They ultimately produced five videos of the incident that they claim to disprove the claims made by the Officer Garibay in his arrest affidavit. Buehler's lawyer, Millie Thompson told the media that APD was repeating their tactic of arresting Buehler and others for legally filming them in public.

The Austin Police Department and the Travis County Attorney's Office issued a joint statement saying that they were dropping the charges against Buehler on November 13, 2015. Currently, Buehler has no outstanding criminal charges.

== Public Safety Commission ==
In May 2015, Buehler was nominated to serve on the Austin Public Safety Commission by Council Member Don Zimmerman. The Austin Police Association immediately began lobbying the city council to keep Buehler off of the commission. while Buehler claimed that his place on the commission was needed in the interest of diversity of thought. After hearing from nearly a dozen community member supporting the nomination, Buehler said that City Council ultimately buckled under the pressure from the Austin Police Association and refused to vote on his nomination by not approving a waiver to his residency status. Eight minutes later the City Council approved the same waiver for another commission nominee.

== Criticism ==
Immediately following the killing of a Deputy in Houston, TX, Buehler used the Peaceful Streets Project Facebook page to post a controversial statement that read, "Pig executed in Houston. Probably shouldn't have joined a criminal gang. His bad decisions caught up with him. Blame his parents. Or the scores of thousands of pigs who abuse people every month in America. #thuglife". Austin Police Chief Hubert Art Acevedo reposted a screenshot of the post on his Twitter account with the commentary, "This is how mind of so-called peaceful activist works & why police officers don't want him inches from their face." Acevedo's statement repeated the narrative that was used to justify Buehler's arrest earlier that month, that Buehler claims were later disproven by video that the Peaceful Streets Project released. Nonetheless, the media ran multiple stories questioning Buehler's choice of words. Buehler argued that he was using the same rhetoric police used after they killed suspects to highlight their hypocrisy. Buehler and the Peaceful Streets Project would repeatedly tweet Chief Hubert Art Acevedo over the following months to highlight that Deputy Goforth was killed while cheating on his wife with a mistress at a gas station while he was supposed to be on duty, arguing that Deputy Goforth did indeed make a series of bad decisions. Chief Hubert Art Acevedo would later go to the media to again complain about Buehler's words after he responded to an Austin Police Officer getting shot in April 2016.

Buehler has repeatedly claimed that "all cops are cowards", and that "cops are terrorist scum." His repeated use of these phrases has irked his critics, including Austin Police Chief Acevedo and Austin Police Association President Ken Casaday. On July 8, 2016, the German paper Kurier ran an article about Buehler calling cops terrorists in the aftermath of the high-profile police killings of Alton Sterling and Philando Castile, and the killing of five Dallas Police Officers by Micah Xavier Johnson.

== Domestic Extremist Allegations ==
In 2012, less than two months after Officer Justin Berry arrested Buehler, Berry authored an alarmist memo and powerpoint presentation calling police accountability groups domestic terrorists. In emails obtained through a FOIA request by Buehler and published online, Berry claimed that a “nationwide movement has begun against the United States Government and all government officials including those at the local level and the police officers employed by these agencies.”

Berry claimed Austin activists, led by Buehler, were "basically ... basing all their movements" off of the film "V for Vendetta" and are manufacturing problems in order to bring about a revolution. He listed a range of activist groups in the email to his superiors, including the Peaceful Streets Project, Occupy Austin, Texans for Accountable Government, and the Institute for Justice.

Berry submitted the powerpoint presentation to the regional fusion center, but was told by the fusion center that they were not going to take such claims seriously.

== Accolades ==
In July 2012, Buehler was chosen to receive the Texans for Accountable Government annual Activist of the Year award. In November 2012, Austin Chronicle readers voted Antonio Buehler as Austin's Best Activist and the Peaceful Streets Project as the Best Grassroots Movement for 2012. Buehler was invited to give a TEDx talk about his experiences combating police abuse at the Harvard Graduate School of Education on April 12, 2014.
