= Police accountability =

Complaint procedures and oversight for police behavior

Police accountability involves holding both individual police officers and law enforcement agencies responsible for effectively delivering basic crime control services and maintaining order, while treating individuals fairly and within the bounds of the law. Police are expected to uphold laws, regarding due process, search and seizure, arrests, discrimination, as well as other laws relating to equal employment, sexual harassment, etc. Holding police accountable is important for maintaining the public's "faith in the system". Research has shown that the public prefers independent review of complaints against law enforcement, rather than relying on police departments to conduct internal investigations. Public perception of police accountability can be partisan. Electoral accountability can improve police accountability of asset forfeiture.

== Discretion ==
The police professionalism approach introduced by August Vollmer and advocated by O.W. Wilson largely ignored issues of police accountability and how officers should handle situations involving discretion. In order to prevent the misuse of discretion, it is necessary to establish a Code of Ethics to serve as a guideline. It is impossible to foresee a provision for every possible scenario; instead codes of ethics are used to provide officers a tool that is flexible, open for interpretation and can be applied in various manners depending on the situation at hand.

== Use of force ==
Use of force by police may involve firearms, as well as other means. Prior to the 1970s, there were generally no written policies or review procedures regarding use of force by law enforcement in the United States. In 1972, New York City Police Department Commissioner Patrick V. Murphy instituted a new policy that confined discretion in use of force to situations only where the officer's own life, or that of other people are in danger. This defense of life rule replaced the fleeing felon rule. The 1985 Supreme Court decision, Tennessee v. Garner ruled that police may only use deadly force to prevent escape when the officer has probable cause to believe that the suspect poses a significant threat of death or serious physical injury to the officer or others.

Since the NYPD instituted new policies on use of force, many other law enforcement agencies have followed suit, establishing a written policy that set guidelines as to when use of force is appropriate. Procedures may include requiring officers to file written reports following each incident. For incidents involving firearms or other use of deadly force, an internal investigation and review is often required. A mechanism in place for administrative review of other use of force incidents may also be part of the policy.

Not all law enforcement agencies in the United States had instituted reforms in the 1980s and 1990s. The United States Department of Justice investigated patterns of abuse within the Pittsburgh Bureau of Police, among other agencies, and brought legal action to force changes.

Less-than-lethal weapons, such as chemical sprays, are used as alternatives to deadly force. These weapons also require policies on their use, along with training on proper use. Police officers are also encouraged to consider a use of force continuum, and try to deescalate situations with verbal warnings and persuasion.

== Body cameras ==
Studies have shown that police officers that wear body cameras while on duty have fewer instances of misconduct and excessive force. In addition, it appears their usage is responsible for a decline in complaints against officers. In order for the usage of body-cameras to be effective, it is important that police officers ensure they are functioning correctly. The devices are not immune to malfunctioning, which could cause critical gaps in recordings. In addition, they can easily be manipulated to face a different direction, or the view can easily be obstructed by other means. According some studies, body cameras fail to capture more than half of incidents in which officers used force.

Some are worried about the privacy of victims who may be recorded by police officers wearing body cameras, raising concerns regarding possible retaliation against those captured cooperating with law enforcement.

After the fatal shootings of several civilians and suspects who didn't seemingly posed a threat, President Barack Obama vowed in 2015 to increase funding for body-worn cameras across the United States.

The introduction of body cameras to United States police departments prompted mixed public reactions. A 2016 Cato Institute survey found that 89% of Americans supported the use of body cameras, while 11% opposed it. Opinion was more closely divided on whether to raise taxes to fund the equipment, with 51% in favor and 49% opposed.

Before body cameras, supervision of police officers was handled much differently by their department. According to the United States Department of Justice, with the number of officers in the field, supervision over each individual officer was a difficult task. The Department of Justice noted that most officials worked alone and that depending on their location, along with the time of their shift, direct oversight was not realistic. Therefore, most accounts of each dispute with an officer was left up to either filling out documentation, or first-hand oral reports. The United States Department of Justice also stated that most supervisors on the force were mostly used for encouraging their fellow officers to make the right decisions on the job to avoid any ill-advised decisions.

In 2016 further research was completed by Rasmussen University, and in the data that was collected by the University showed many concerns from multiple local police departments were voiced. One of the concerns was centered around the storage of all of the daily footage shot on the aforementioned cameras. Stating that many officers were worried that storing and/or managing evidence will become much more complex in later years with all of the video that is collected.

In a 2016 study conducted by the Bureau of Justice Statistics, data presented from multiple different sheriff offices and police departments that there was a 78% increase on the quality of admissible evidence, meanwhile civilian complaints dropped 81%. As far as the safety of police officers, it improved 82% within those specific departments chosen for the study. The Bureau of Justice Statistics showed that there was approximately 36% of departments felt that the body worn cameras were an invasion of privacy, along with 26% of sheriff offices according to data received from 2016. Nonetheless according to Rasmussen University, by the end of 2016 the majority of Police and Sheriff Departments were overall in favor of the use of body worn cameras on officers.

== Vehicle pursuits ==
Vehicle pursuits are another use of police power that can involve much discretion on part of the officer. However, if a pursuit is conducted negligently, resulting in death or injury, the law enforcement agency can be held liable under civil law in the United States. Vehicle pursuits have increasingly been covered under written law enforcement agency policy, to help regulate circumstances and manner that they are conducted.

== By country ==
=== United States ===
Special commissions, such as the Knapp Commission in New York City during the 1970s, have been used to bring about changes in law enforcement agencies. Civilian review boards (permanent external oversight agencies) have also been used as a means for improving police accountability. Civilian review boards tend to focus on individual complaints, rather than broader organizational issues that may result in long-term improvements.

The 1994 Violent Crime Control and Law Enforcement Act authorized the United States Department of Justice's Civil Rights Division to bring civil ("pattern or practice") suits against local law enforcement agencies, to reign in abuses and hold them accountable. As a result, numerous departments have entered into consent decrees or memoranda of understanding, requiring them to make organizational reforms. This approach shifts focus from individual officers to placing focus on police organizations.

==== Issues with accountability ====
In 1982, The United States Supreme Court introduced the doctrine of qualified immunity in Harlow v. Fitzgerald:

This doctrine, invented by the Court out of whole cloth, immunizes public officials even when they commit legal misconduct unless they violated 'clearly established law.' That standard is incredibly difficult for civil rights plaintiffs to overcome because the courts have required not just a clear legal rule, but a prior case on the books with functionally identical facts.

In 2001 with Saucier v. Katz and Pearson v. Callahan the US Supreme Court allowed courts to grant qualified immunity on the basis of clearly established law or lack of precedent, without the court having to subsequently clearly established the law.

==== Police accountability organizations ====
There are several police accountability organizations in the United States that intend to curb instances of police misconduct. These organizations may focus on changing legislation, promoting awareness, or encouraging people to document incidents of police misconduct.

- Bad Apple, an open source collaboration between Priveasy and the Aaron Swartz Day Police Surveillance Project, providing valuable tools and resources with the aim of holding law enforcement accountable and putting an end to police misconduct.
- Coalition Against Police Abuse, a Los Angeles focused group that focuses on police abuse against marginalized communities
- Committee Against Anti-Asian Violence, a New York City focused group that deals with police abuse along with many other issues
- Communities United for Police Reform, an internet campaign founded in the wake of NYPD's Stop and Frisk policy
- Cop Block, a libertarian internet platform reporting on police abuse stories
- El Grito de Sunset Park, a Puerto Rican activist group co-founded by Dennis Flores.
- National Police Accountability Project, a project of the National Lawyers Guild
- Peaceful Streets Project, a national grassroots organization founded by Antonio Buehler
- We Copwatch, an Oakland-based grassroots organization founded by Jacob Crawford

=== United Kingdom ===
The United Kingdom addressed concerns of police accountability by enacting the Police Act in 1996. This act gave police authorities the responsibility to provide transparency regarding policing plans. In addition, they were given the task to monitor, collect and publish data regarding police performance, complaints and budgeting matters. Elected police and crime commissioners replaced police authorities responsibility for overseeing police forces beginning in 2012.

=== India ===
Police accountability in India is ensured through courts, human rights commissions, police complaint authorities, legislative oversight, and internal mechanisms—but implementation gaps, political interference, and weak independent oversight remain major hurdles.

== See also ==
- Asset forfeiture
- Blue wall of silence
- Police misconduct
- Police board
- Political corruption
- Security sector governance and reform
- Whistleblower protection in the United States
