= Copwatch =

Activist groups focusing on police misconduct

Copwatch logo

Copwatch (also Cop Watch or Cop-Watch) is a network of typically autonomous activist organizations, focused in local areas in the United States, Canada, and Europe, that observe and document police activity looking for signs of police misconduct and brutality. They believe that monitoring police activity on the streets is a way to prevent police brutality. They also propose theoretical and practical approaches to security and justice structures to replace the police. They criticize capitalism and see crime as a consequence of social problems that cannot be fought by surveillance and punishment.

Copwatch was started in Berkeley, California, in 1990.

== Methods ==
The main function of most Copwatch groups is monitoring police activity. "Copwatchers" go out on foot or driving patrols in their communities and record interactions between the police, suspects, and civilians. Copwatchers hope that monitoring police activity will provide a deterrent against police misconduct. Some groups also patrol protests and demonstrations to ensure that police do not violate the rights of protesters. One Copwatch organization states that it has a policy of non-interference with the police, although this may not be true for all groups. In Phoenix, Arizona, copwatchers have increased the practice of "reverse surveillance" of the police in an effort to document racial profiling. They believe that Arizona Senate Bill 1070, a controversial law that allows police to question people they believe are illegal immigrants, will increase racial profiling by police.

Copwatch groups also hold "Know Your Rights" forums to educate the public about their legal and human rights when interacting with the police, and some groups organize events to highlight problems of police abuse in their communities.

Copwatch calls for responses to, or critical evaluation of, police controls in order to support those affected, especially by racial or class profiling. Educational work regarding the powers of the police as well as civilian rights is a focus of Copwatch in order to support more people in their encounters with police.

== Activities ==
=== Response to the killing of Kendra James ===
In 2003, Kendra James was fatally shot by Portland, Oregon officer Scott McCollister as she attempted to drive away from a traffic stop with Officer McCollister attempting to pull her out of the vehicle. After the shooting Copwatch offered a reward for a photograph of McCollister. It then produced and distributed posters bearing McCollister's photo and the phrase "Getting away with murder".

The editorial staff of Willamette Week opined that the poster was "inflamed rhetoric" which would harm "the relationship between the Portland police and the community it serves", and said that protest posters put up by the Rose City chapter of Copwatch were aimed at "inciting generalized anti-cop hysteria at the expense of informed criticism".

A member of the Rose City Copwatch group said that the shooting "demonstrate[s] a culture of racism and brutality that's really sort of at the core of policing". A grand jury later found no criminal wrongdoing on McCollister's part.

=== William Cardenas video ===
November 3, 2006: Video showing an LAPD officer striking William Cardenas 6 times in the face as he struggles to prevent the officers from handcuffing him.

On November 3, 2006, CopWatch LA posted a video showing the arrest of William Cardenas, whom police described as "a known gang member who had been wanted on a felony warrant for receiving stolen property". According to the arrest report, when officers tried to arrest Cardenas as he was drinking beer on the sidewalk with two others, he fled, but was caught and tripped by the officers, who then began to attempt to handcuff Cardenas as he fought with the officers to avoid being arrested.

The video, in which Cardenas struggles to prevent the police from handcuffing him, shows an officer repeatedly punching him in the face while trying to force his hands together. The officers indicated that they were unable to subdue Cardenas with pepper spray, which seemed to have "little effect", and that some of the punches were delivered in response to Cardenas putting his hand on one officer's gun holster during the struggle. According to the arrest report, several witnesses confirmed that Cardenas threw punches at the officers, who were only able to handcuff him after two of his friends arrived and told him to stop fighting.

The circulation of this video led to nationwide media coverage of Copwatch, and, although the LAPD had begun a use-of-force investigation the same day as the arrest, prompted an additional investigation into police conduct by the Federal Bureau of Investigation. A Superior Court commissioner had previously concluded that the use of force was reasonable because Cardenas was resisting arrest.

=== International Day against Police Violence 15 March ===
On the International Day against Police Violence, designated as March 15, the different Copwatch groups organize actions together or in relation to each other. They focus on what they say are aspects of police violence, such as racist and sexist police violence, or violence against the climate justice movement seen as critical of capitalism.

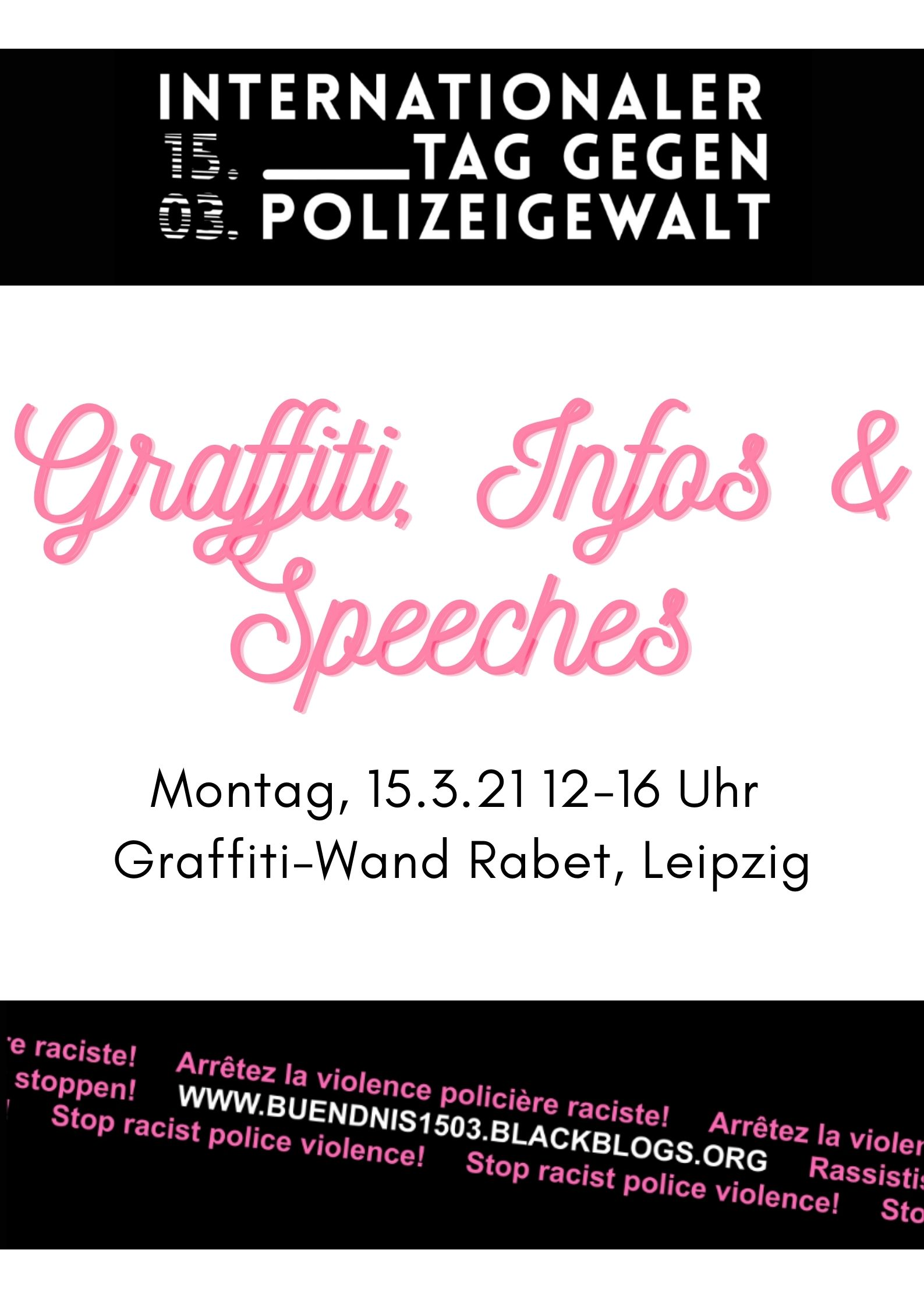
Poster for International Day against Police Violence

=== Opposition to new police and security laws ===
Copwatch opposes increases of resources and powers for the police which they connect to increasing social militarization which they also oppose. Many Copwatch groups are involved in alliances against new police and security laws that expand the police's areas of responsibility instead of solving the material roots of inequality.

=== Information and documentation points ===
Many local Copwatch groups have created information and/or documentation centers. People maintaining that they are Victims of discriminatory behavior or police violence can turn to the groups for legal, financial or emotional support.

=== Educational work ===
As one of the core aims of the Copwatch groups is to document police stops and support those affected, there is a call to film the police. Workshops are given on how to intervene in police checks, what rights one has vis-à-vis the police, and what legal powers the police have.

== Awards ==
In 2013 Berkeley Copwatch was awarded the James Madison Freedom of Information Award by the Society of Professional Journalists, Northern California chapter, for "effective use of public records to block a Homeland Security grant for putting an armored military vehicle on the streets of Albany and Berkeley."

== Criticism ==
Joe Arpaio, the former Sheriff of Maricopa County, Arizona, who was accused of police brutality among his deputies and corrections officers and was personally convicted of contempt of court, said that his opponents' videotaping of police during traffic stops create safety concerns for his deputies.

Tim Dees, former police officer and editor-in-chief of Officer.com, alleges that Copwatch selectively distributes video and photographic media to "spin" incidents against law enforcement.

== List of local Copwatch organizations ==
The following is an inexhaustive list of local Copwatch organizations

- Berkeley, California
- Oakland, California
- Austin, Texas
- Ferguson and St. Louis, Missouri
- Chicago, Illinois
- Portland, Oregon
- Los Angeles, California
- New York City, New York
- San Diego, California
- Paris, France
- Charleston, South Carolina
- Rock Hill, South Carolina
- Tampa, Florida
- Hamburg, Germany
- Frankfurt am Main, Germany
- Leipzig, Germany

There are also groups working on the same topics:

- KOP: Campaign for victims of racist police violence in Bremen, Berlin, Kiel (Germany)
- KGP: Cooperation against police violence (Dresden)

=== Media coverage ===
Active press work and the creation of its own communication channels have helped to bring police criticism increasingly into the public eye.

On 2 August 2016, the BBC documentary NYPD: Biggest Gang in New York? aired on the British television channel BBC One, focusing on the activities of cop watchers in New York, including Ramsey Orta who filmed the death of Eric Garner.

The documentary film Copwatch premiered at the 2017 Tribeca Film Festival, which depicted the organization WeCopwatch, including segments on Ramsey Orta, Kevin Moore, who filmed the police abuse of Freddie Gray, and David Whitt who lived in the apartment complex where Michael Brown was killed, as well as Jacob Crawford, who seeded and co-founded Copwatch groups inspired by the Berkeley Copwatch group.

On October 23, 2019, BET Network premiered a show named Copwatch America. The network describes the docu-series as a "provocative look into police brutality and whistleblowers battling the issue".

== See also ==
- These Streets are Watching
- Peaceful Streets Project
- Photography is Not a Crime (PINAC)
- Cop Block
- Inverse surveillance
- Legal observer (LO)
- Witness (organization)
- Police accountability
- Video evidence
- First Amendment audit
