= Killing of Chantel Moore =

Killing of an Indigenous Canadian woman in New Brunswick

On June 4, 2020, Chantel Moore, an Indigenous Canadian woman, was shot and killed by Constable Jeremy Son of the Edmundston, New Brunswick police, who were called to perform a wellness check on her. Moore's death drew national attention and outrage. However, New Brunswick's public prosecution service said it found Son's actions to be reasonable in the circumstances and he was not charged with any crime.

== Background ==
Moore was a member of the Tla-o-qui-aht First Nation and had recently moved to Edmundston to be closer to her mother and six-year-old daughter. The wellness check was asked for by Moore's boyfriend in Montreal, who was worried about Moore after she reported being harassed or someone possibly trying to break in to her home during a housewarming party.

== Incident ==
Moore opened the door to her residence holding a knife and walked towards the responding officer. When commands by the officer, in French, to drop the knife were not followed, he fired four times, killing Moore. The officer was not equipped with a Taser.

=== Public response ===
In response to the incident, attention was raised to the fact that Edmundston police officers do not wear body cameras; this is not unusual for police services in Canada due to the cost of the devices and questions over their effectiveness. Moore's family questioned the decision of the Edmundston officer to not attempt using non-lethal force in the interaction, considering the shooting to have been excessive given the small stature of Moore and the fact that she was only armed with a knife. Indigenous Services Minister Marc Miller commented "I don't understand how someone dies during a wellness check."

=== Investigation ===
As New Brunswick does not have its own police investigation service, Quebec's Bureau of Independent Investigations investigated the killing. This decision drew calls from Indigenous leaders for an independent public investigation into her death. Investigators concluded the report in December 2020, referring it to New Brunswick's public prosecution service to determine if charges should be laid. After reviewing the report and available evidence, the prosecution service determined that the officer's actions were "reasonable under the circumstances," finding that he was confined to a third-floor balcony and that she posed a "potential lethal threat approaching him quickly." The Criminal Code of Canada allows police officers to defend themselves and others with lethal force under certain circumstances. The independent report corroborated initial police allegations that Moore did not follow commands to drop the knife. Witnesses heard the commands. The officer, a use of force instructor for the department, was not equipped with a Taser.

A coroner's inquest made 20 recommendations for ways that law enforcement can better respond to police interventions. The Edmundston police department at the time of the incident only had one functioning Taser; their total was later increased to 4 and officers were "trained and equipped with pepper spray and a telescopic baton, as less lethal tools."

== Aftermath ==
Occurring just over a week after the death of Regis Korchinski-Paquet, an Indigenous-black woman, the shooting of Moore caused scrutiny to be raised over Canadian police's capability to de-escalate situations involving mental health crisis. Indigenous leaders, Moore's grandmother, and Minister Miller linked the killing to systemic racism of Indigenous people by Canadian police. In the aftermath of the killing, the chiefs of a coalition of Maliseet First Nations called for an independent probe of the New Brunswick justice system to address systemic discrimination against Indigenous people. Rallies, protests, and healing walks were held across Canada to call for justice for Moore. The killing of Moore, coupled with another fatal police shooting eight days later, led to Premier Blaine Higgs deciding not to proceed with proposed legislation to increase the emergency powers of the police. The investigation's findings were called a "stinging blow" by British Columbia's First Nations Leadership Council. Moore's family filed a lawsuit the following year alleging that the city provided inadequate training to law enforcement involved in wellness checks and accusing Son of negligence. The city and Son deny the allegations; the claims brought by Moore's family have not yet been proven in court.

In 2023, New Brunswick reached an agreement with Nova Scotia to allow that province's Serious Incident Response Team to open an office in New Brunswick to act as a local police watchdog for incidents in the province.

== See also ==
- Police brutality against Indigenous Canadians
