= Dennis Flores (activist) =

Puerto Rican activist

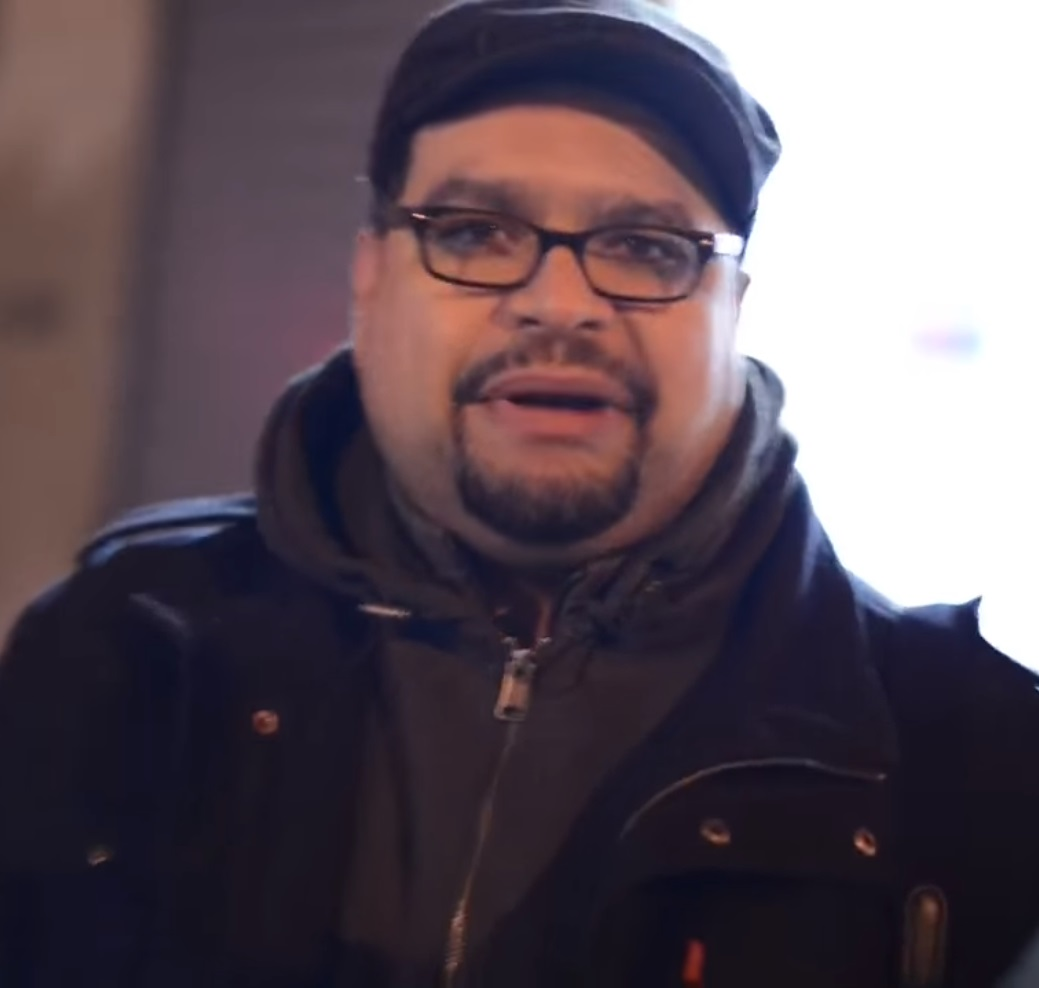
- Flores in 2016
- Born: United States
- Occupation: Activist

Dennis Flores is a Puerto Rican activist and "cop watcher" who works in New York City.

== Background ==
Flores began filming the activities of the New York City Police Department in 1995, and has been arrested more than 70 times during this period. According to the BBC, Flores's "use of video to expose police brutality has blazed a trail for the growing police accountability movement." In 2002, Flores and a few others co-founded the activist group El Grito de Sunset Park, before filming police activities was common. According to Flores, the organization was founded with a $270,000 settlement he received after the police attacked him in 2002. The group's activities include organizing an art festival; advocating against gentrification; and photographing police activities.

== See also ==
- List of Puerto Ricans
