= El Grito de Sunset Park =

Puerto Rican activists in Brooklyn

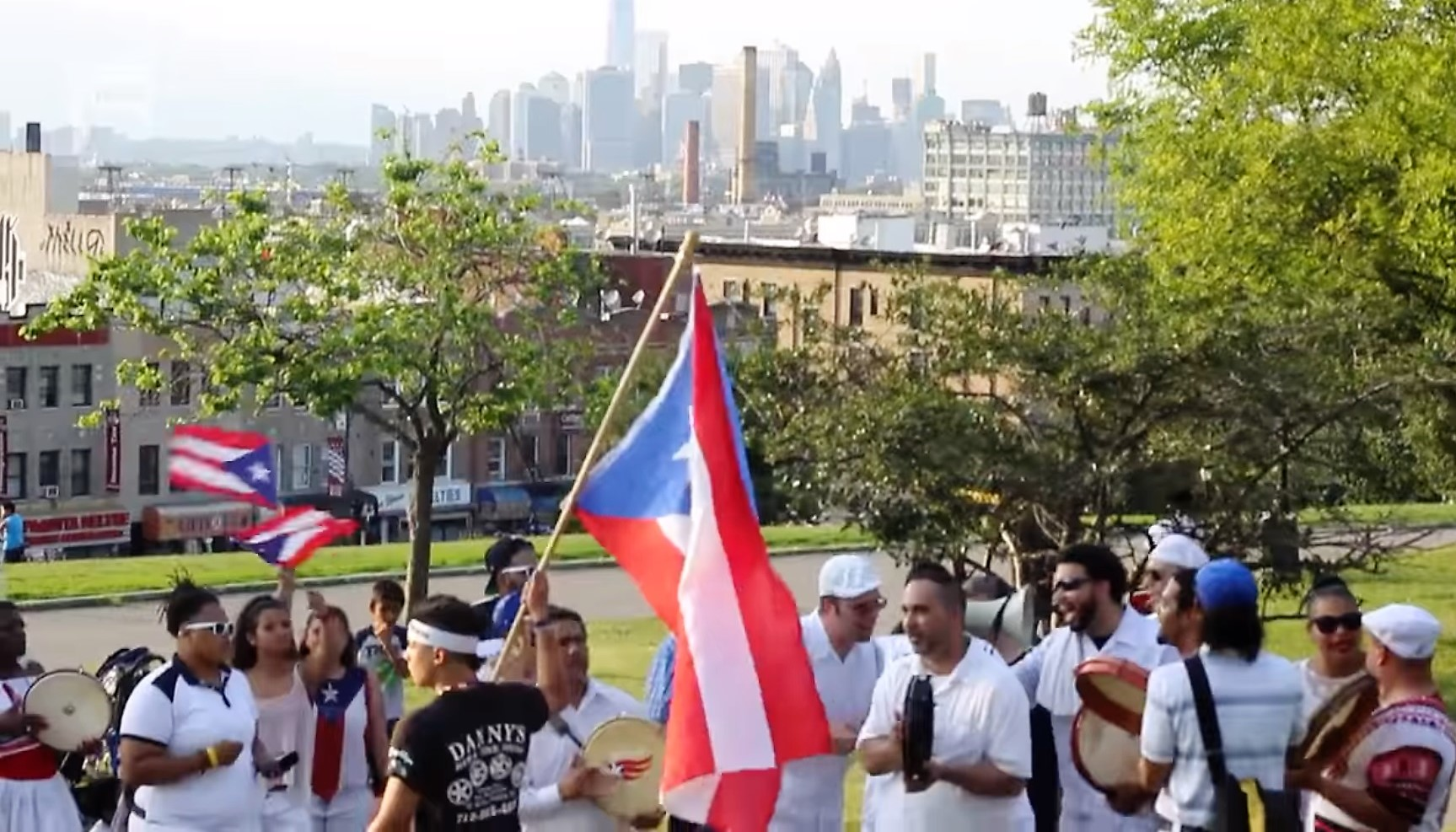
- El Grito de Sunset Park gathering in 2016
- Formation: c. 2002
- Type: 501(c)(3) organization
- Location: Brooklyn, New York, U.S.
- Website: elgritodesunsetpark.com

El Grito de Sunset Park is a Puerto Rican activist organization in Brooklyn that has been described as a police watchdog.

== History ==
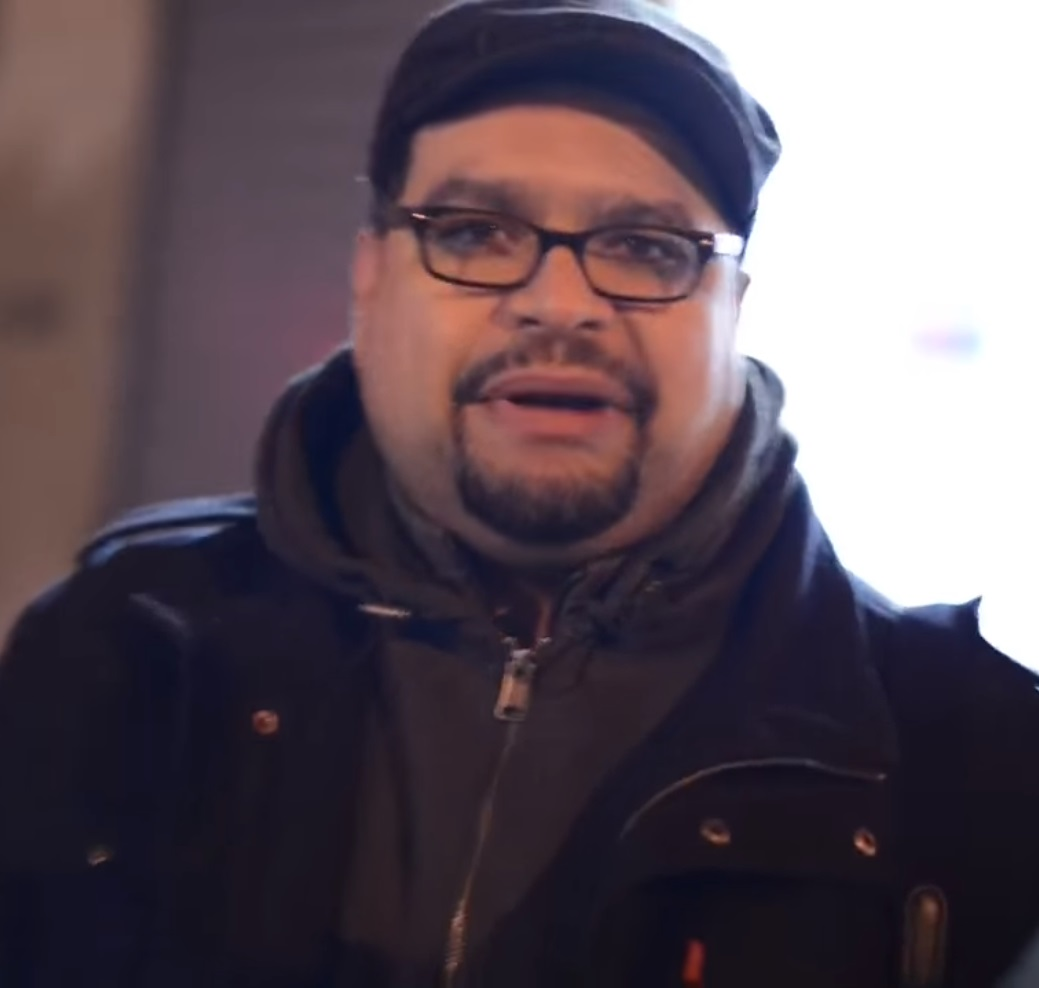
Dennis Flores in 2016

One of the founders of El Grito de Sunset Park is Dennis Flores, a "cop watcher" who began documenting the activities of the New York City Police Department in 1995. He has been arrested more than 70 times for his activities. Flores and others founded El Grito de Sunset Park in 2002, before filming police activities was common. According to Flores, the organization was founded with a $270,000 settlement he received after the police attacked him in 2002. The group became a 501(c)(3) organization in 2015.

The organization has roots in the primarily Puerto Rican neighborhood of Sunset Park in Brooklyn. The name "El Grito" means "the cry" or "the call" in Spanish, and is a reference to the independence movements El Grito de Lares in Puerto Rico and El Grito de Dolores in Mexico. El Grito de Sunset Park has ties to the Young Lords, a Puerto Rican radical group. The group's founders were influenced by social movements in Latin America; Flores witnessed organizing efforts in the Mexican city of Oaxaca in 2006 and 2007, while Jason Del Aguila, also a cofounder, worked for some time in Guatemala and El Salvador.

== Activities ==
El Grito de Sunset Park's activities include organizing an art festival; advocating against gentrification; and photographing police activities. When it began, the organization would film police responses to the Puerto Rican Day Parade, which were sometimes violent. Eventually, the group began to film all year. In 2012, the group supported a rent strike in Sunset Park. Hispanic music and spoken word poetry are commemorated in videos made by El Grito de Sunset Park. In 2015, the group began organizing its own Puerto Rican Day Parade and Festival. It worked to gather and send supplies to Puerto Rico in the aftermath of Hurricane Maria in 2017. In 2014, one of the group's videos played a role in charges against a teenage resident of Sunset Park getting dropped, while in 2015 another helped get charges dropped against a Mexican street vendor accused of attacking a policeman.

== Sources ==
- Robé, Christopher (Winter 2020). "El Grito de Sunset Park: Cop Watching, Community Organizing, and Video Activism". Journal of Cinema and Media Studies. 59 (2): 62–87. doi:10.1353/cj.2020.0003. S2CID 214194508.
