= Starlight tours =

Anti-Indigenous Canadian police actions

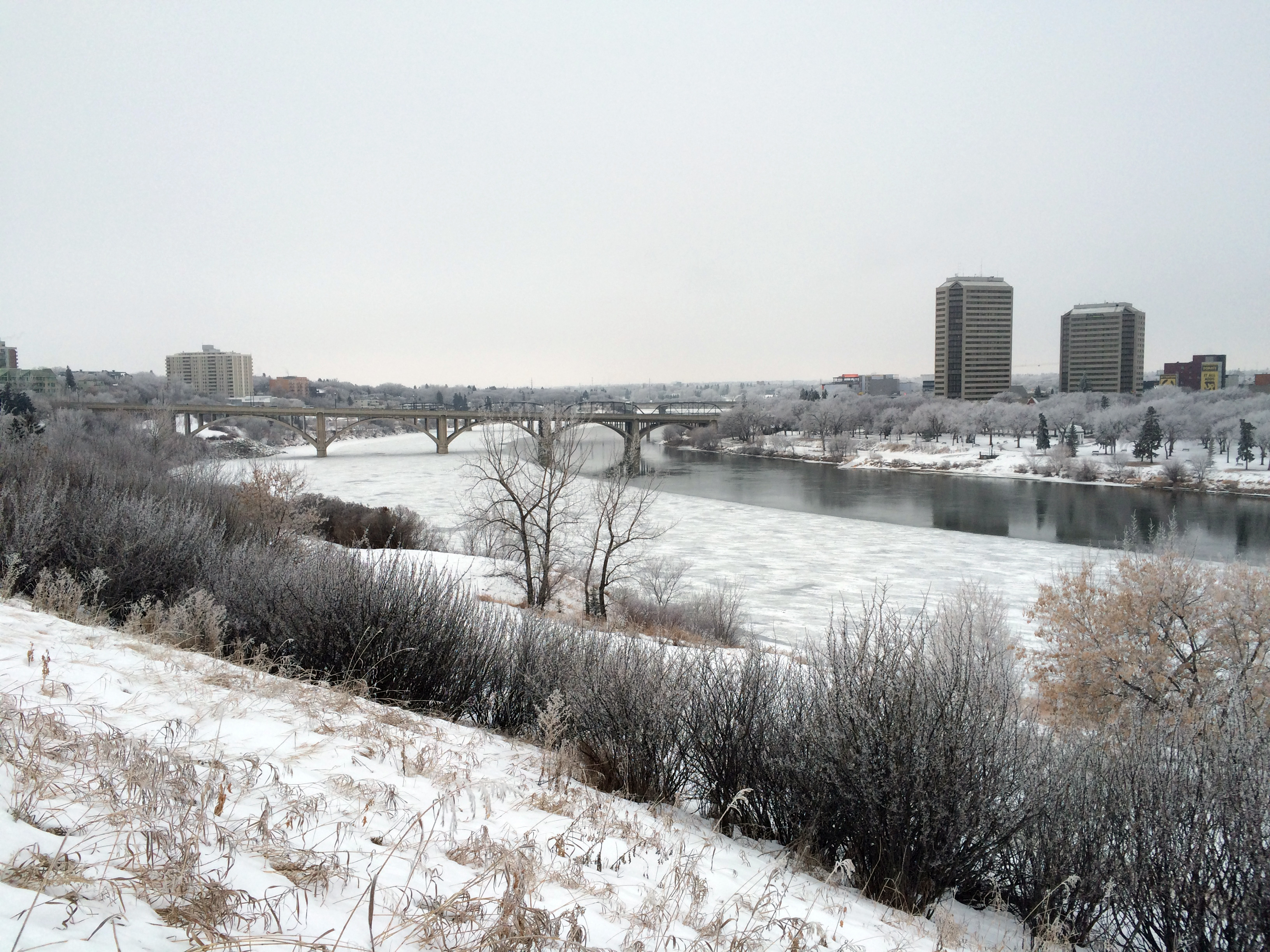
A photo of a riverbank near Saskatoon, Saskatchewan, taken during winter. During the winter months, average temperatures in Saskatoon can be as cold as −20.7 °C (−5.3 °F).

Starlight tours are a series of incidents involving Indigenous Canadians and members of the Saskatoon Police Service (SPS) over a period spanning from at least 1976 to 2018, in and immediately outside the city of Saskatoon, Saskatchewan.

Police officers are thought to have arrested Indigenous people, usually male, for supposed drunkenness and/or disorderly behaviour, but sometimes without cause. The officers would then allegedly drive them to the outskirts of the city at night and abandon them in sub-zero temperatures. At least seven such incidents have been claimed—three of which resulted in deaths—although there was only one case in which police officers were convicted of any wrongdoing. Four such incidents allegedly occurred between 1990 and 2000. A false report was made of such an incident around 2016, and another similar incident was claimed in 2018. Among all of these alleged incidents, only one conviction of police officers occurred, resulting in two officers going to prison for eight months.

== Incidents and allegations ==
First Nations people who died from hypothermia in the area included Neil Stonechild, Rodney Naistus, and Lawrence Wegner.

Stonechild's body was found on November 29, 1990, in a field outside Saskatoon, which led to an inquest. Stonechild determined to have died on November 24, 1990, a night on which the temperature reached −28.1 °C (−18.6 °F). The 2003 inquest could not determine the circumstances that led to his death.

Naistus and Wegner died in 2000, and their bodies were discovered on the outskirts of Saskatoon. Inquests in 2001 and 2002 into their deaths determined they were due to hypothermia but were deemed inconclusive. The inquest jury's recommendations all related to police policies and indigenous–police relations.

Another alleged victim of the practice was Darrell Night, who survived his police encounter. In January 2000, Night was dropped off on the outskirts of Saskatoon in −22 °C (−8 °F) weather without winter clothing and was able to get help by knocking on the door of the nearby Queen Elizabeth Power Station. The two police officers involved, constables Dan Hatchen and Ken Munson of the Saskatoon Police Service (SPS), claimed they had simply given Night a ride home and dropped him off at his own request. They were convicted of unlawful confinement in September 2001 and sentenced to eight months in prison.

The SPS initially insisted these were isolated incidents. However, in 2003, Police Chief Russell Sabo admitted that there was a possibility that the force had been dumping First Nations people outside the city for years, revealing that an SPS officer was disciplined in 1976 for taking an indigenous woman to the outskirts of the city and abandoning her there.

In 2016, an Indigenous man was sentenced to four months imprisonment for falsely reporting a "starlight tour" incident.

On April 21, 2018, Ken Thomas alleged that he was picked up by two SPS officers and dropped off outside city limits at night in the cold. This accusation was investigated by the Public Complaints Commission, which stated that it was unfounded. In a news release, Police Chief Troy Cooper said it was unlikely that there was contact between the SPS and Thomas on the night of the incident, based on video and audio recordings taken from police cars.

== Police attempts to delete public information ==
Between 2012 and 2016, the "Starlight tours" section of the article about the SPS on the English Wikipedia was deleted several times. An internal investigation revealed that two of the edits originated from a computer within the SPS. Alyson Edwards, a spokesperson for the force, denied that the removal of content was officially approved by the force. On March 31, 2016 the Saskatoon StarPhoenix reported that "Saskatoon police have confirmed that someone from inside the police department deleted references to 'Starlight tours' from the Wikipedia web page about the police force." According to the report, a "police spokeswoman acknowledged that the section on starlight tours had been deleted using a computer within the department, but said investigators were unable to pinpoint who did it." The spokeswoman stated that the SPS was working to "move forward with all of the positive work that has been done, and continues to be done that came out of the Stonechild inquiry."

== In media ==
=== Film and television ===
Darrell Night's experiences were documented in Tasha Hubbard's 2004 National Film Board of Canada documentary Two Worlds Colliding, winner of the Canada Award. A fictional incident was also portrayed in the half-hour drama Out in the Cold, directed by Colleen Murphy and starring Gordon Tootoosis. An episode of Canadian TV series Tribal titled "Starlight, Starbright" is a dramatization of a starlight tour.

=== Music ===
The Canadian band Propagandhi's song "Bringer of Greater Things" off their 2005 album Potemkin City Limits is "Dedicated to Rodney Naistus, Neil Stonechild and Lawrence Wegner, murdered by members of the Saskatoon Police Department."

Canadian musician Kris Demeanor's song "One Shoe" was written about Neil Stonechild. The Wailin' Jennys' song "Starlight" was also inspired by the starlight tours.

In 2017, Mi'kmaq artist Cathy Elliott completed a five-week workshop with students from Sheridan College for her musical Starlight Tour. This work was commissioned by the Grand Theatre in London, Ontario in collaboration with Sheridan College's Canadian Music Theatre Project.

=== Podcasts ===
Starlight tours are discussed in podcasts such as Criminal and Commons.

== See also ==
- Disappearances of Terrance Williams and Felipe Santos – 2003–2004 missing persons cases in the US
- List of excessive police force incidents in Canada
- Highway of Tears – Canadian corridor infamous for crimes against women
- Pinkenba Six – Queensland, Australia police officers accused of misconduct
- Police brutality against Indigenous Canadians
