= Legal observer =

Monitors of public demonstrations

Legal observers are individuals, usually representatives of civilian human rights agencies, who attend public demonstrations, protests and other activities where there is a potential for conflict between the public or activists and the police, security guards, or other law enforcement personnel. The purpose of legal observers is to monitor, record, and report on any unlawful or improper behaviour. Legal or human rights observers act as an independent third party within a conflictual civil protest context, observing police behaviour in order to keep police accountable for their actions. Legal observers can write incident reports describing police violence and misbehaviour and compile reports after the event. The use of video and still cameras, incident reports and audio recorders is common.

== History ==
It is thought that the concept of using legal observers first emerged during protests in the 1930s in the East End of London, where police agents provocateur were used during protests by the British Union of Fascists (BUF). There were large counter-protests and it was alleged that the police sided with the BUF. Another case of legal observing was that carried out by the Black Panthers in the United States.

Legal observers were used by Liberty (then known as the National Council for Civil Liberties) in Wapping, London, during the mid-1980s. The Wapping demonstration was in response to large protests by labour unions against the industrial relations policies of media magnate Rupert Murdoch.

In the United States, the National Lawyers Guild (NLG) holds registered trademarks for the words "legal observer" alone, as well as the words "legal observer" on a green background. The National Lawyers Guild Legal Observer certification program was established in 1968 in New York City in response to protests at Columbia University and citywide antiwar and civil rights demonstrations. That same year, guild students organized for the defense of people swept up in mass arrests at the Democratic National Convention in Chicago. The NLG Legal Observer certification program requires legal observers to take a training course and is part of a comprehensive system of legal support designed to enable people to express their political views as fully as possible without unconstitutional disruption or interference by the police and with the fewest possible consequences from the criminal justice system. Legal observers are trained and directed by National Lawyer Guild attorneys. The presence of legal observers may serve as a deterrent to unconstitutional behavior by law enforcement during a demonstration.

NLG worked with the Bureau des Avocats Internationaux, the Institute for Justice & Democracy in Haiti, and the International Association of Democratic Lawyers to debut legal observers in Haiti during May Day protests of 2018.

In other countries, legal observers are associated with such groups as Liberty (UK), Green and Black Cross (UK), the Scottish Community & Activist Legal Project (SCALP) (Scotland), and others. In Australia in the 1970s, priests acted as legal observers during the large Moratorium Marches against the Vietnam War. In September 2000, Pt'chang Nonviolent Community Safety Group organised a large legal observer team for the S11 protest against the World Economic Forum in Melbourne. A decade later, during the Occupy movement, an ongoing group of legal observer teams was established and called Melbourne Activist Legal Support, observing actions throughout Melbourne. In Sydney, the Legal Observers Project, formally based at the Community Law Centre at the University of Technology, Sydney, and renamed Human Rights Monitors, was established in April 2001. This group reformed as Sydney Copwatch in 2009. Human rights organizations such as Amnesty International sometimes dispatch human rights observers who serve similar roles to legal observers.

== See also ==
- Copwatch
- Election monitoring
- Killing of Alex Pretti
- Police accountability
- Pressure groups in the United Kingdom
- Watchdog journalism
- Witness (organization)
