= These Streets are Watching =

These Streets are Watching is a 50-minute video on police accountability in three communities in the United States; Denver, Cincinnati and Berkeley. The video documents incidents that its creators consider demonstrate the unnecessary use of force by the police. Independent filmmaker, Jacob Crawford, weaves the responses made in these three cities to police brutality into a single tale of community empowerment and direct action. The film conveys basic legal concepts that can provide practical help to groups and individuals seeking an understanding of their rights when dealing with police. The film is divided into sections that explain citizen's basic rights, tactics for documenting police activity and ideas for further action.

These Streets Are Watching has been screened across the United States and has played on television across the nation.
