= Police brutality =

Use of excessive force by a police officer

A silhouette showing a police officer striking a person, symbolising police brutality.

Police brutality is the excessive and unwarranted use of force by law enforcement against an individual or a group. It is an extreme form of police misconduct and is a civil rights violation. Police brutality includes, but is not limited to, asphyxiation, beatings, shootings, improper takedowns, racially-motivated violence and unwarranted use of tasers.

== History ==
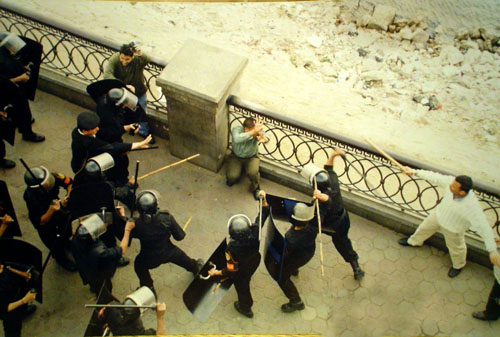
Nine police officers attacking a surrendering civilian in Egypt, using wooden rods to strike them

The first modern police force is widely regarded to be the Metropolitan Police Service in London, established in 1829. However, some scholars argue that early forms of policing began in the Americas as early as the 1500s on plantation colonies in the Caribbean. These slave patrols quickly spread across other regions and contributed to the development of the earliest examples of modern police forces. Early records suggest that labor strikes were the first large-scale incidents of police brutality in the United States, including events like the Great Railroad Strike of 1877, the Pullman Strike of 1894, the 1912 Lawrence textile strike, the Ludlow massacre of 1914, the Great Steel Strike of 1919, and the Hanapepe massacre of 1924.

The term "police brutality" was first used in Britain in the mid-19th century, by The Puppet-Show magazine (a short-lived rival to Punch) in September 1848, when they wrote:

Scarcely a week passes without their committing some offence which disgusts everybody but the magistrates. Boys are bruised by their ferocity, women insulted by their ruffianism; and that which brutality has done, perjury denies, and magisterial stupidity suffers to go unpunished. [...] And police brutality is becoming one of our most "venerated institutions!"

The first use of the term in the American press was in 1872 when the Chicago Tribune reported the beating of a civilian who was under arrest at the Harrison Street Police Station.

In the United States, it is common for marginalized groups to perceive the police as oppressors, rather than protectors or enforcers of the law, due to the statistically disproportionate number of minority incarcerations.

Hubert G. Locke wrote:

When used in print or as the battle cry in a black power rally, police brutality can by implication cover several practices, from calling a citizen by his or her first name to death by a policeman's bullet. What the average citizen thinks of when he hears the term, however, is something midway between these two occurrences, something more akin to what the police profession knows as "alley court"—the wanton vicious beating of a person in custody, usually while handcuffed, and usually taking place somewhere between the scene of the arrest and the station house.

— Police Brutality and Civilian Review Boards: A Second Look (1966–1967)

Sometimes riots, such as the 1992 Los Angeles riots, are a reaction to police brutality. The 1991 beating of Rodney King brought tension between the residents and police force throughout Los Angeles. This incident was recorded as one of the worst police brutality cases, which spread throughout media internationally, fueling the riots.

== Causes ==
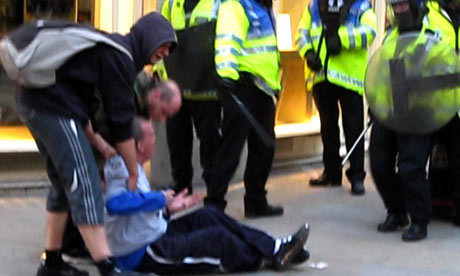
Ian Tomlinson, a newspaper vendor, remonstrating with Metropolitan Police officers after being pushed to the ground during the 2009 G20 summit protests in London. He collapsed and died a few minutes later.

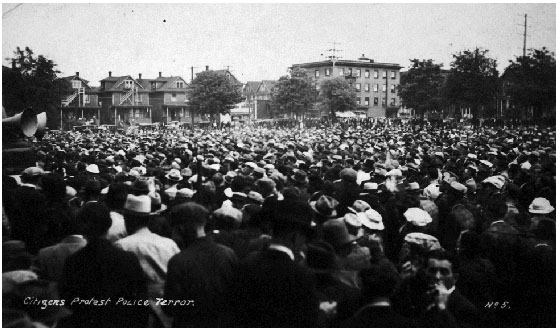
Protest against police brutality after the eviction of unemployed demonstrators occupying the Post Office in Vancouver, Canada, 1938

=== Hard on drugs campaigns ===
In nations with a reputation for having a high number of drug-related issues, including gang violence, drug trafficking, and overdose deaths, one common solution that government will enact is a collective campaign against drugs that spans the entirety of the state's establishment. Changes to address these issues encompass education, bureaucracy, and, most notably, law enforcement policy and tactics. Law enforcement agencies expand and receive more funding to attack drug problems in communities. Acceptance of harsher policing tactics grows as well, as an any means necessary philosophy develops within the law enforcement community and the militarization of local police forces. However, many studies have concluded that these efforts are in vain, as the drug market has grown in such nations despite anti-drug policies. For example, in the United States, critics of the War on Drugs waged by the government have been very vocal about the ineffectiveness of the policy, citing an increase in drug-related crimes and overdoses since President Nixon first introduced this policy.

=== Legal system ===
A type of government failure that can result in the normalization of police brutality is a lack of accountability and repercussions for officers mistreating civilians. While it is currently commonplace for civilians to hold officers accountable by recording them, the actual responsibility of police oversight rests heavily on the criminal justice system of a given nation, as police represent the enforcement of the law. One method of increasing police accountability that has become more common is the employment of body cameras as a part of police uniforms. However, the effectiveness of body cameras has been called into question due to the lack of transparency shown in police brutality cases where the footage is withheld from the public. In many cases of police brutality, the criminal justice system has no policy in place to condemn or prohibit police brutality. Certain nations have laws that permit lawful, violent treatment of civilians, like qualified immunity, which protects officers from being sued for their use of violence if their actions can be justified under the law.

Police officers are legally permitted to use force. Jerome Herbert Skolnick writes in regards to dealing largely with disorderly elements of the society, "some people working in law enforcement may gradually develop an attitude or sense of authority over society, particularly under traditional reaction-based policing models; in some cases, the police believe that they are above the law."

There are many reasons why police officers can sometimes be excessively aggressive. It is thought that psychopathy makes some officers more inclined to use excessive force than others. In one study, police psychologists surveyed officers who had used excessive force. The information obtained allowed the researchers to develop five unique types of officers, only one of which was similar to the bad apples stereotype. These include personality disorders; previous traumatic job-related experience; young, inexperienced, or authoritarian officers; officers who learn inappropriate patrol styles; and officers with personal problems. Schrivers categorized these groups and separated the group that was the most likely to use excessive force. However, this "bad apple paradigm" is considered by some to be an "easy way out". A broad report commissioned by the Royal Canadian Mounted Police (RCMP) on the causes of misconduct in policing calls it "a simplistic explanation that permits the organization and senior management to blame corruption on individuals and individual faults – behavioural, psychological, background factors, and so on, rather than addressing systemic factors." The report continues to discuss the systemic factors, which include:

- Pressures to conform to certain aspects of "police culture", such as the Blue Code of Silence, which can "sustain an oppositional criminal subculture protecting the interests of police who violate the law" and a "'we-they' perspective in which outsiders are viewed with suspicion or distrust"
- Command and control structures with a rigid hierarchical foundation ("results indicate that the more rigid the authoritarian hierarchy, the lower the scores on a measure of ethical decision-making" concludes one study reviewed in the report); and
- Deficiencies in internal accountability mechanisms (including internal investigation processes).

The use of force by police officers is not kept in check in many jurisdictions by the issuance of a use of force continuum, which describes levels of force considered appropriate in direct response to a suspect's behavior. This power is granted by the government, with few if any limits set out in statutory law as well as common law.

Violence used by police can be excessive despite being lawful, especially in the context of political repression. Police brutality is often used to refer to violence used by the police to achieve politically desirable ends (terrorism) and, therefore, when none should be used at all according to widely held values and cultural norms in the society (rather than to refer to excessive violence used where at least some may be considered justifiable).

Studies show that there are officers who believe the legal system they serve is failing and that they must pick up the slack. This is known as "vigilantism", where the officer-involved may think the suspect deserves more punishment than what they may have to serve under the court system.

During high-speed pursuits of suspects, officers can become angry and filled with adrenaline, which can affect their judgment when they finally apprehend the suspect. The resulting loss of judgment and heightened emotional state can result in inappropriate use of force. The effect is colloquially known as "high-speed pursuit syndrome".

== Global prevalence ==
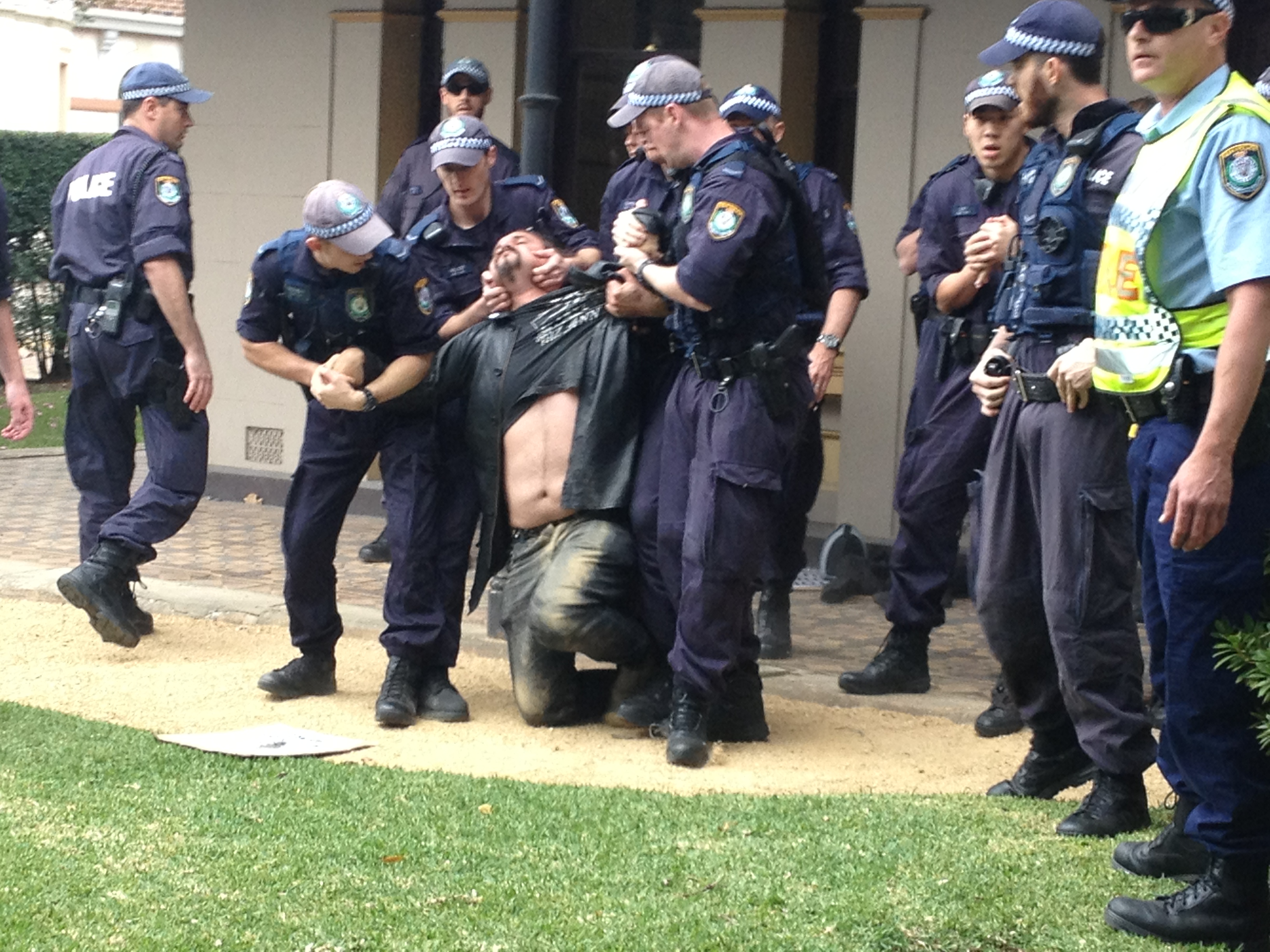
Australian police using an illegal pain hold on an activist at the University of Sydney in 2012.

US riot police arrest a protester at the Delaney Hall protests, 2026

- The Amnesty International 2007 report on human rights also documented widespread police misconduct in many other countries, especially countries with authoritarian regimes.
- In the UK, the reports into the death of New Zealand teacher and anti-racism campaigner Blair Peach in 1979 was published on the Metropolitan Police website on 27 April 2010. They concluded that Peach was killed by a police officer, but that the other police officers in the same unit had refused to cooperate with the inquiry by lying to investigators, making it impossible to identify the actual killer.
- In the UK, Ian Tomlinson was filmed by an American tourist being hit with a baton and pushed to the floor as he was walking home from work during the 2009 G-20 London summit protests. Tomlinson then collapsed and died. Although the officer who assaulted Tomlinson was arrested on suspicion of manslaughter, he was later released without charge. He was later dismissed for gross misconduct.
- In the UK, in 2005, a young Brazilian man was arrested and shot by Metropolitan Police in Central London. The man, Jean Charles Menezes, died later.
- In Serbia, police brutality occurred in numerous cases during protests against Slobodan Milošević, and has also been recorded at protests against governments since Milošević lost power. One case was recorded in July 2010, when five people, including two girls, were arrested, handcuffed, beaten with clubs, and mistreated for one hour. Security camera recordings of the beating were obtained by the media and public outrage when released. Police officials, including Ivica Dačić, the Serbian minister of internal affairs, denied this sequence of events and accused the victims "to have attacked the police officers first". He also publicly stated that "police [aren't] here to beat up citizens", but that it is known "what one is going to get when attacking the police".
- Episodes of police brutality in India include the Rajan case, the death of Udayakumar, and of Sampath.
- Police violence episodes against peaceful demonstrators appeared during the 2011 Spanish protests Furthermore, on 4 August 2011, Gorka Ramos, a journalist of Lainformacion was beaten by police and arrested while covering 15-M protests near the Interior Ministry in Madrid. A freelance photographer, Daniel Nuevo, was beaten by police while covering demonstrations against the Pope's visit in August 2011.
- In Brazil, incidents of police violence have been well-reported and Brazil has one of the highest prevalences of police brutality in the world today.
- South Africa from apartheid to today has had incidents of police brutality, though police violence is not as prevalent as during the apartheid years.
- In Argentina, since the rise of the far-right in 2023, every demonstration against the government's policies has been met with police brutality, with several thousands injured, including minors. Photographer Pablo Grillo suffered brain trauma after being struck by a tear gas canister shot straight at his face.

=== Statistics and cases ===
- List of countries with annual rates and counts for killings by law enforcement officers
- List of cases of police brutality by date
- List of cases of police brutality
- List of unarmed African Americans killed by law enforcement officers in the United States
- List of killings by law enforcement officers in the United States
- List of killings by law enforcement officers in Canada
- Police brutality by country

== Investigation ==
In England and Wales, an independent organization known as the Independent Police Complaints Commission (IPCC) investigates reports of police misconduct. They automatically investigate any deaths caused by or thought to be caused by, police action.

A similar body known as the Police Investigations and Review Commissioner (PIRC) operates in Scotland. In Northern Ireland, the Police Ombudsman for Northern Ireland has a similar role to that of the IPCC and PIRC.

In Africa, there exist two such bodies: one in South Africa and another one in Kenya known as the Independent Policing Oversight Authority.

In the United States, more police are wearing body cameras after the shooting of Michael Brown. The US Department of Justice has made a call to action for police departments across the nation to implement body cameras in their departments so that further investigation will be possible.

== Measurement ==
Police brutality is measured based on the accounts of people who have experienced or seen it, as well as the juries who are present for trials involving police brutality cases, as there is no objective method to quantify the use of excessive force for any particular situation.

In addition to this, police brutality may also be filmed by police body cameras, worn by police officers. Whereas body cams could be a tool against police brutality (by prevention, and by increasing accountability). However according to Harlan Yu, executive director from Upturn, for this to occur, it needs to be embedded in a broader change in culture and legal framework. In particular, the public's ability to access the body camera footage can be an issue.

In 1985, only one out of five people thought that police brutality was a serious problem. Police brutality is relative to a situation: it depends on if the suspect is resisting. Out of the people who were surveyed about their account of police brutality in 2008, only about 12 percent felt as if they had been resisting. Although the police force itself cannot be quantified, the opinion of brutality among various races, genders, and ages can. African Americans, women, and younger people are more likely to have negative opinions about the police than Caucasians, men, and middle-aged to elderly individuals.

== Independent oversight ==
Various community groups have criticized police brutality. These groups often stress the need for oversight by independent civilian review boards and other methods of ensuring accountability for police action.

Umbrella organizations and justice committees usually support those affected. Amnesty International is a non-governmental organization focused on human rights with over three million members and supporters around the world. The stated objective of the organization is "to conduct research and generate action to prevent and end grave abuses of human rights, and to demand justice for those whose rights have been violated".

Tools used by these groups include video recordings, which are sometimes broadcast using websites such as YouTube.

Civilians have begun independent projects to monitor police activity to try to reduce violence and misconduct. These are often called "Cop Watch" programs.

== See also ==
- Authoritarian personality
- Civil liberties
- Civil rights
- Death squad
- International Day Against Police Brutality (15 March)
- Law enforcement agency
- Law enforcement and society
- Legal observer
- Militarization of police
- Photography is Not a Crime
- Police misconduct
- Police riot
- Political violence
- Prisoner abuse
- Protest policing
- Rough ride
- Suicide by cop
- Use of force continuum

=== US specific ===
- Christopher Commission
- Copwatch
- Pitchess motion
- Police brutality in the United States
