= Saskatoon Police Service =

Police service of Saskatoon, Saskatchewan, Canada

Saskatoon Police Service Service de police de Saskatoon
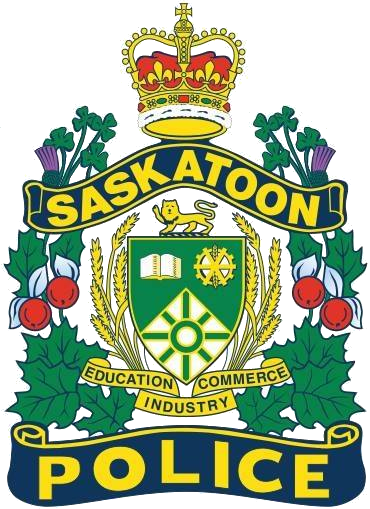
- Uniform badge of the Saskatoon Police Service

- Patch (i.e. shoulder flash) of the Saskatoon Police Service
- Abbreviation: SPS
- Motto: Neque Timore Neque Favore (English: Neither by fear nor by favour)

Agency overview
- Formed: 1903
- Annual budget: CA$121.6 million (2025)

Jurisdictional structure
- Legal jurisdiction: Saskatoon, Saskatchewan, Canada

Operational structure
- Headquarters: 76 25th Street East; Saskatoon, Saskatchewan; S7K 3P9 52.1343829634765°N 106.66670092008314°W
- Sworn members: 460 regular members and 59 special constables (2017)
- Unsworn members: 135 civilians (2017)
- Elected officer responsible: The Honourable Tim McLeod, Minister of Justice and Attorney General
- Agency executives: Cam McBride, Chief of Police; Dave Haye (Support Services) Darren Pringle (Operations), Deputy Chiefs

Website
- www.saskatoonpolice.ca

Saskatoon Police Service (SPS) is the municipal police service in Saskatoon, Saskatchewan, Canada. It holds both municipal and provincial jurisdiction. Police Chief Cam McBride is the head of the service. The deputy chiefs are Dave Haye (Support Services) and Darren Pringle (Operations). The SPS operates in partnership and cooperation with the Corman Park Police Service and the Royal Canadian Mounted Police.

== History ==
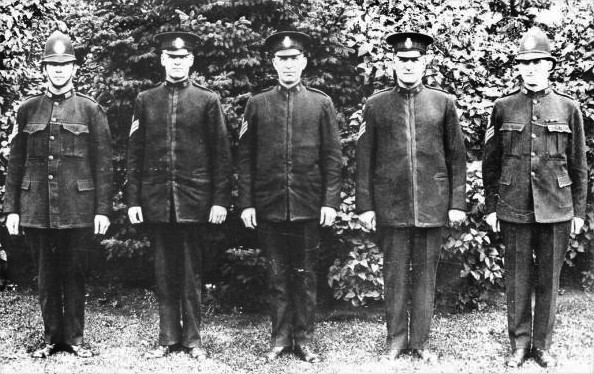
1910 Police Force

In 1887 the North-West Mounted Police (NWMP) established a detachment in Saskatoon, in what is now the Nutana area of the city. The detachment moved across the river to a building on First Avenue between 19th and 20th Streets sometime after the area that is now the downtown was first settled in 1890. In 1889, Constable John Clisby of the NWMP became the settlement's first permanent police officer.

In January 1906, ex-NWMP constable Robert E. Dunning was appointed "Inspector, Constable, Engineer and Liquor License Inspector" for the then-Town of Saskatoon. Prior to that, Dunning had sworn an oath of office as a "Special Constable for the province of Saskatchewan" for November and December 1905. It is not clear what his precise duties or those of his predecessor, William Page Hurst (appointed constable for the then-Northwest Territories, 15 August - 31 December 1905) were, but presumably they were related to law enforcement in Saskatoon. After Saskatoon was incorporated as a city later that year, Dunning was appointed Chief of Police. In 1910 the first Rules and Regulations of the Saskatoon Police Department were approved.

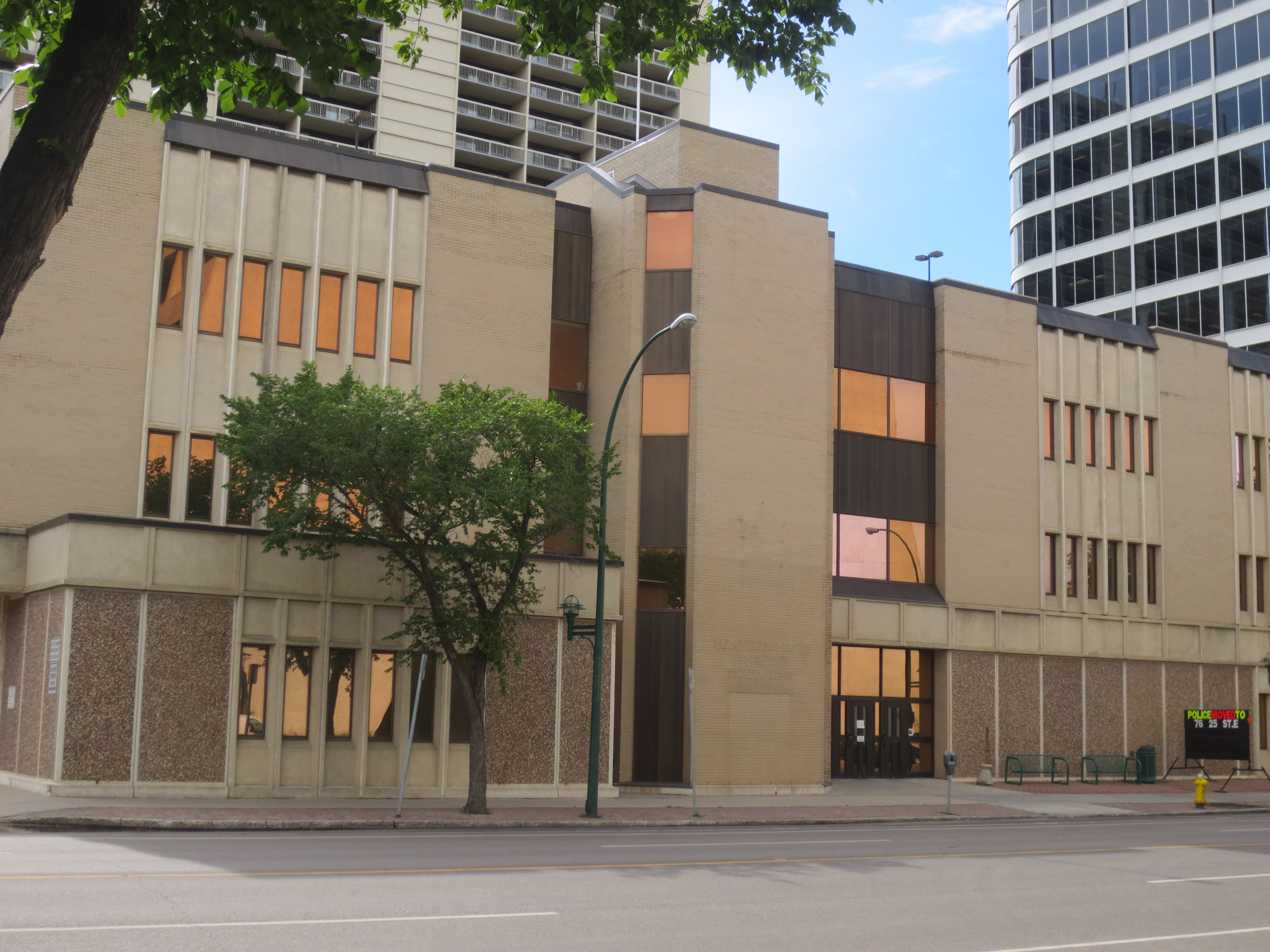
Former Saskatoon Police Service headquarters

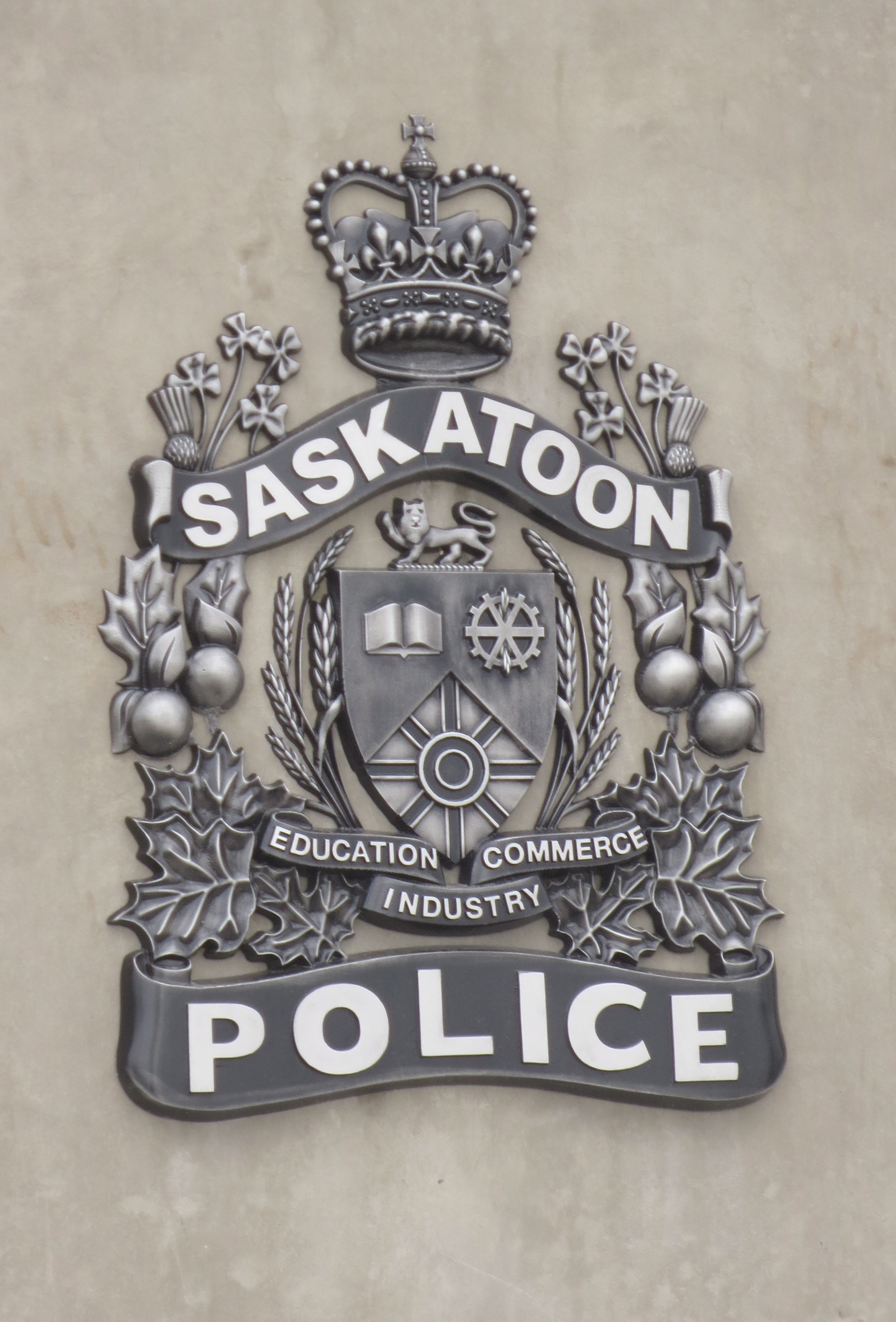
Service shield, on new building in 2014

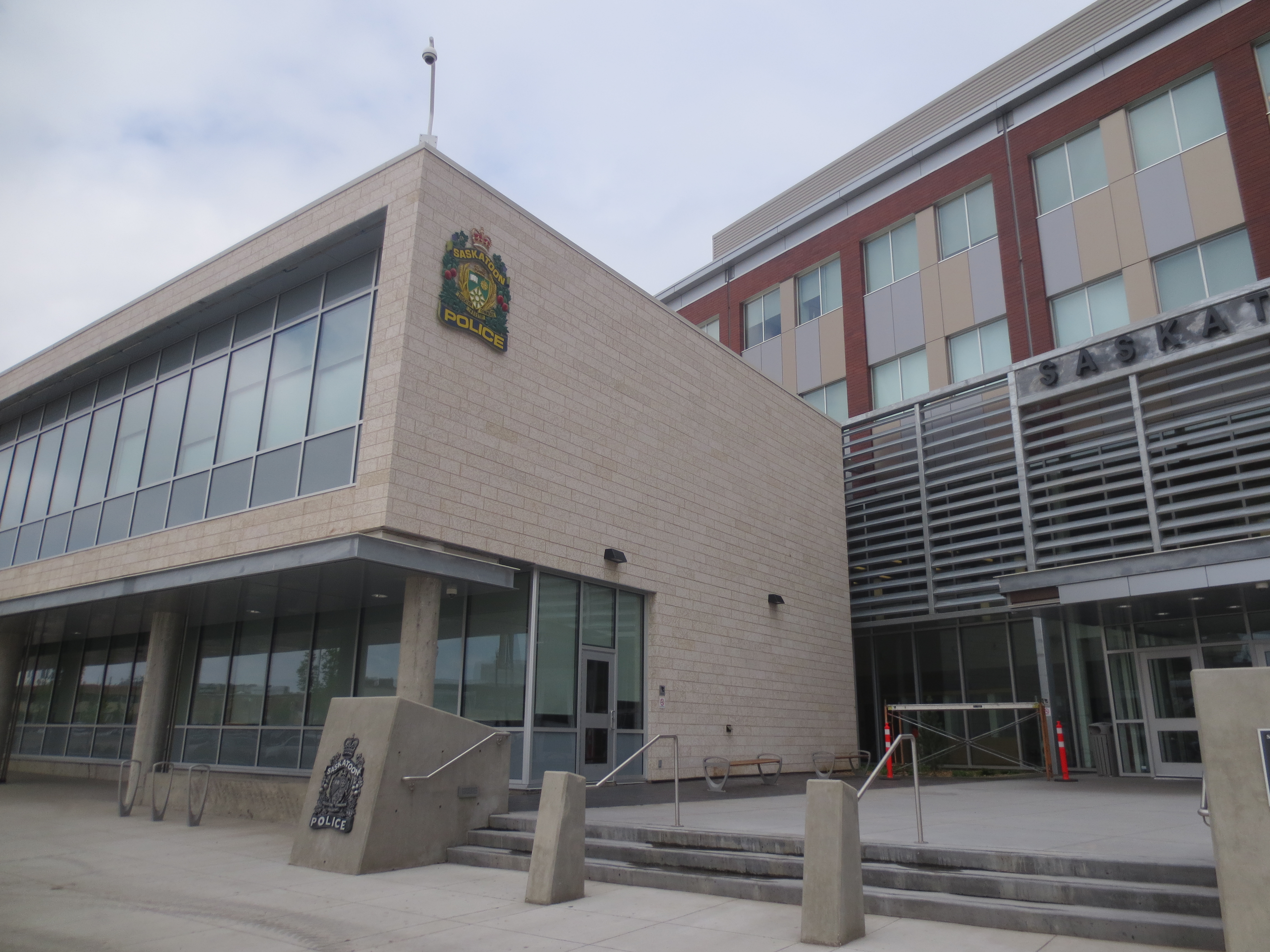
A front view of the new Police Service headquarters building in 2014

In 1930, the force moved into its first purpose-built police station, the Municipal Justice Building on the corner of 4th Avenue and 23rd Street, across from City Hall. In 1977, a new station was built next to it. The old station was demolished in 1996 and the space became a parking lot. The new building cost roughly $5.5 million and had a floor space of 101,000 sq. feet. On 22 July 2014, Saskatoon's police operations moved into a new, much larger building on the 25th Street extension, between First Avenue and Idylwyld Drive. Built at a cost of $122 million, it is expected that it will serve as the central headquarters for the next 50 years.

Dating back to at least 1976, the SPS is known for discrimination against the Indigenous people of Canada, through the practice of extrajudicial killings known as the "starlight tours", where Indigenous people were taken to the edge of the city in the dead of winter and abandoned so they freeze to death. It is unknown how many people have died from these "starlight tours". There are at least three suspected cases that led deaths.

=== International police peacekeeping operations ===
With struggling police forces worldwide there is a need for trained police officers to help training these forces. During 2009 and 2010 Constable Andrew Johnstone went to Afghanistan to train their police, and Sergeant Patrick Barbar in Kandahar, Afghanistan. Other members of the SPS have worked in other countries for other UN operations, such as Sergeant Darcel Pittman and former Deputy Chief Keith Atkinson in Kosovo in 2000.

They play widely varying roles within each mission, from patrolling streets and training police recruits to providing humanitarian assistance, ensuring security for elections and investigating human rights violations.

== Structure ==
The Office of the Chief of the Saskatoon Police Service (SPS) reports to the Board of Police Commissioners. Both Deputy Chiefs, the Legal Services Division and Professional Standards Division report to the Office of the Chief chief of police. The two Deputy Chiefs manage the Operations Division and Support Services Division. The Operations Division has superintendents for Criminal Investigations and Patrol, and the Public Affairs Unit. The Support Services Division includes Human Resources, Technological Services, Finance, Central Records and Asset Management, Specialized Uniform Operations and Headquarters. Each of the Support Services divisions are managed by a Director (Civilian) or Inspector (Sworn Officer). As of 2015 the SPS had 448 sworn Regular Constables, 59 Special Constables and 133 Civilian positions. The ranks are as follows:

Chief	Deputy chief	Superintendent	Inspector	Staff Sergeant	Sergeant	Constable	Special constable
Rank Insignia	Rank Insignia	Rank Insignia	Rank Insignia	Rank Insignia	Rank Insignia	No Rank Insignia	Rank Insignia

Ceremonial heraldic badge of the SPS granted by the CHA in 2007

Ceremonial coat of arms of the SPS granted by the CHA in 2007

== Police chiefs ==
- Robert Dunning (1905–1915)
- George Donald (1915–1946)
- Albert Milne (1946–1953)
- James Kettles (1954–1977)
- John Gibbon (1977–1982)
- Joseph Penkala (1982–1991)
- Owen Maguire (1991–1996)
- Dave Scott (1996–2001)
- Jim Matthews (2001)
- Russell Sabo (2001–2006)
- Clive Weighill (2006–2018)
- Troy Cooper (2018-2023)
- Dave Haye (2023-2024)
- Cam McBride (2024- present)

== Bruce Gordon Physical Fitness Centre ==
Besides being an active athlete, Bruce Gordon started out in C Platoon with the Saskatoon Police Service before moving up through the Saskatoon Police Service as Saskatoon Detective Sergeant for in the Sex Crimes Unite as wells as Major Crime/Homicide Unit. Gordon was honoured in 2004 with the Exemplary Service Medal, and again honoured in 2021 with the Chief's Award of Excellence. Police Chief Clive Weighill made an announcement at the special ceremony held to call Gordon to the bar. In tribute to Bruce Gordon, the Saskatoon Police gym will be named after Bruce Gordon, the Bruce Gordon Physical Fitness Centre.

== Controversies ==
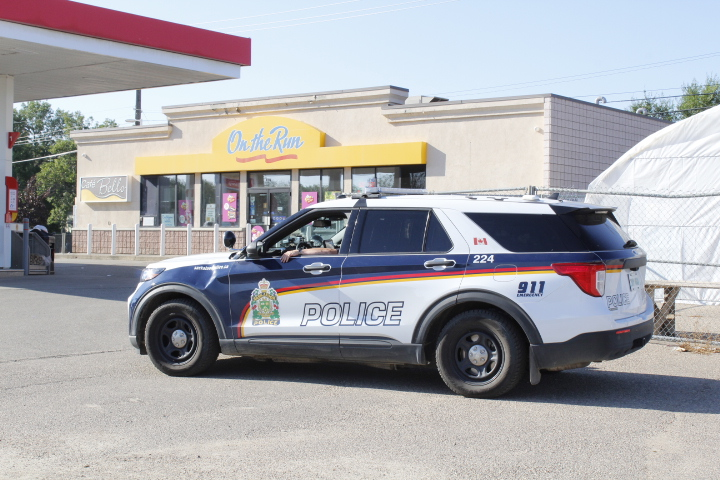
A Saskatoon police SUV in August 2024

Accusations against the Saskatoon Police Service have resulted in public inquiries. One such inquiry took place in 2006. It involved the investigation into the murder of a nursing student in Saskatoon in 1969. David Milgaard was convicted of this murder but was later cleared of this charge through DNA evidence which was unavailable at the time of his trial.

On 8 September 2003, The Commission of Inquiry into the death of Neil Stonechild began, headed by commissioner Justice David Wright. The objective of the commission was to ascertain whether Neil Stonechild was apprehended on 25 November 1990, and while in police custody, driven out of the city and abandoned. The commission was a result of allegations by Darrell Night that two Saskatoon Police Officers dropped him off outside the city in January 2000. The commission found that the two officers, Senger and Hartwig, had taken Stonechild into custody shortly before he died on the outskirts of city. No charges were laid on the two officers but they were both fired.

=== Freezing deaths ("starlight tours") ===
The Saskatoon Police Service has engaged in what has been called "starlight tours", the practice of taking Indigenous people to the edge of the city in the dead of winter and abandoning them there. In January 2000, Darrell Night was dropped off on the outskirts of Saskatoon but was able to survive. The two officers involved were convicted of unlawful confinement in September 2001 and sentenced to eight months in prison. In 2003, police chief Russell Sabo admitted that there was a practice in place, that the force had been dumping Indigenous people outside the city for years, after revealing that in 1976 an officer was disciplined for taking an Indigenous woman to the outskirts of the city and abandoning her there.

Other Indigenous people who may have been subject to "starlight tours" are Rodney Naistus, Lawrence Wegner and Neil Stonechild. Rodney Naistus and Lawrence Wegner died in 2000 and their bodies were discovered on the outskirts of Saskatoon. However inquests in 2001 and 2002 into their deaths were unable to determine the circumstances that led to their deaths. The inquest juries made recommendations related to police policies and police force relations with Indigenous people. Neil Stonechild's body was found in 1990 in a field outside Saskatoon. A 2003 inquest was not able to determine the circumstances that led to his death. Two officers were dismissed from the Saskatoon Police Service for their alleged involvement in this matter.

Between 2012 and 2016, the "Starlight tours" section of the Saskatoon Police Service's Wikipedia article was deleted several times. An internal investigation revealed that two of the edits originated from a computer within the police service. A spokesperson for the force denied that the removal of content was officially approved by the force. On 31 March 2016, the Saskatoon Star Phoenix reported that "Saskatoon police have confirmed that someone from inside the police department deleted references to "Starlight tours" from the Wikipedia web page about the police force." According to the report, a "...police spokeswoman acknowledged that the section on starlight tours had been deleted using a computer within the department, but said investigators were unable to pinpoint who did it." The police spokeswoman stated that the force is working to "move forward with all of the positive work that has been done, and continues to be done that came out of the Stonechild inquiry."

== See also ==
- Rotary Museum of Police and Corrections
