= Neil Stonechild =

Saulteaux starlight tour victim (1973–1990)

Neil Stonechild (August 24, 1973 – November 25, 1990) was a Saulteaux First Nations teenager who was found frozen to death in a remote field on the outskirts of Saskatoon in November 1990. Prior to his death, Neil Stonechild was picked up by 2 police officers from the Saskatoon Police Service and then dropped off. At the time his body was found, he had visible injuries, including those consistent with handcuffs, and he was partially clothed and only had one shoe. There were accusations that the police service had taken him to the northwest section of the city and abandoned him in a field on a night when temperatures were below −28 °C (−18 °F). The practice is known as a starlight tour, and a number of such cases in the Saskatoon area have been referred to collectively as the Saskatoon freezing deaths.

On February 20, 2003, the Government of Saskatchewan announced the appointment of the Honourable Mr. Justice D.H. Wright to conduct an inquiry into the death of Neil Stonechild and the conduct of the investigation into his death.

== Background ==
Stonechild was an accomplished wrestler, having won a bantamweight provincial title in Saskatchewan. He had also been convicted of breaking and entering earlier that year, and sentenced to live in a group home.

== Death ==
Stonechild's friend Jason Roy was with Stonechild the night of his death. When first interviewed by the police in 1990, 5 days after Stonechild's disappearance, Roy provided a handwritten, signed statement stating that he and Stonechild had drunk most of a 40-ounce bottle (1.4 litre) of vodka between them. Roy also stated that he and Stonechild had parted company at "about 1130 pm", and that he had "blacked out" and had no recollection of what happened after he and Stonechild separated that night. In 2000, however, Roy stated that the last time he saw Stonechild alive, Stonechild was handcuffed in the back of a police cruiser "gushing blood" from a cut on his face, and that the last words Stonechild said to him were "Jay, help me. They're going to kill me." Jason Roy's family was ultimately put into an RCMP witness protection program.

Roy also stated that he had given the police officers a false name – Tracy Lee Horse – when they questioned him. Shortly after talking to Jason Roy, Constables Brad Senger and Larry Hartwig encountered Neil Stonechild's cousin, Bruce Genaille, and questioned him on suspicion that he was Stonechild. In 2003, Genaille told the inquiry that there had been nobody in the back of the cruiser at the time.

At 11:56 p.m. on November 24, 1990, Constable Brad Senger performed a query on the Canadian Police Information Centre (CPIC) computer system for the names "Tracy Horse" and "Tracy Lee Horse", the false name provided by Jason Roy. Three minutes later, at 11:59 p.m., Constable Senger performed a CPIC query for the name "Neil Stonechild". Five minutes later, at 12:04 a.m., November 25, 1990, Constable Hartwig conducted a CPIC query of the name "Bruce Genaille". Genaille testified at the Wright inquiry that there had been nobody in the back of the cruiser when Hartwig and Senger questioned him.

Stonechild's body was found, with one shoe missing, on November 29 by two construction workers. In the initial investigation of his death, the Saskatoon police determined that there was no foul play. Ten years later, however, his companion on November 24/25, Jason Roy, said Stonechild had been in police custody. Roy said he had seen his friend in the back of a police cruiser. In 2000 the Royal Canadian Mounted Police investigated Stonechild's death and the deaths of other First Nations individuals thought to have been in police custody.

== Inquiry ==
In 2003, the Saskatchewan provincial government held a Commission of Inquiry (the Wright Inquiry) into Stonechild's death. The report concluded that Stonechild had been picked up by the police shortly before he died on the outskirts of the city. The inquest reported that the officers did not record the interaction in their log books. It concluded that marks on Stonechild's wrists and on his nose could have been caused by handcuffs. The report also concluded that relations between the police and First Nations are problematic. However, the inquiry found that at the time of the death the police investigation was not adequate to conclude what the circumstances were surrounding Neil Stonechild's death. The inquiry concluded on May 19, 2004.

Following the inquest, police officers Larry Hartwig and Brad Senger were fired. It was appealed but the firings were upheld.

== In media ==
- Canadian musician Kris Demeanor's song 'One Shoe', (recorded by Geoff Berner) was written about Stonechild's death and the Saskatoon freezing deaths more generally.
- Thomas King: The Inconvenient Indian: A Curious Account of Native People in North America. The illustrated edition. Doubleday Canada, 2017 ISBN 9780385690164 pp. 200–201 (First ed. 2013: without illustr.) With a portrait of Stonechild
- The podcast Criminal covered the case of Neil Stonechild, and the Saskatoon freezing deaths, in their episode, "Starlight Tours."
- Starlight Tour: The Last, Lonely Night of Neil Stonechild, 2006 book by Susanne Reber and Robert Renaud
