= Cop Block =

American decentralized police accountability project

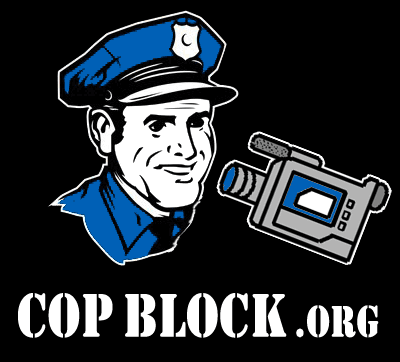
- Formation: January 1, 2010; 16 years ago
- Type: Decentralized project
- Purpose: Promote law enforcement accountability and abolishment, expose alleged police misconduct
- Key people: Pete Eyre, Ademo Freeman, Severin Freeman, Matthew Taylor.

Cop Block is a decentralized anti-police project. The organization's members and volunteers attempt to draw attention to alleged or evident police abuses that happen across the United States, and work to film police to force transparency and accountability within their ranks. However, believing that accountability will never end police brutality, the group shifted its focus to the complete abolishment of all law enforcement.

== Activities ==
In July 2010, anarchists and libertarians Pete Eyre and Adam "Ademo Freeman" Mueller, key members of the organization were arrested for videotaping officials at the Franklin County, Massachusetts jail. The organization is known for videotaping public officials nationally, with many of the interactions ending in arrest based on an allegation that the activities violate local laws, regulations, policies or rules civil disobedience.

In October 2011, Cop Block sponsored a "National Chalk the Police Day" in fifteen cities to protest arrests of protesters who had used chalk to write anti-police slogans on the sidewalks of public property. The event passed largely unnoticed.

In 2011, Cop Block posted a video to their website, alleging that a Manchester, New Hampshire police officer had used excessive force on a student at West High school. According to the New Hampshire Union Leader, the student showed no visible signs of injury either in his mugshot or later interviews. Cop Block founder Ademo Freeman interviewed the officer involved as well as the school principal and was subsequently arrested for illegal wiretapping, convicted and sentenced to 90 days in jail and three years of probation out of a potential 21 years in prison. His conviction was overturned on appeal on 1st Amendment grounds.

== Controversies ==
In July 2011, Kershaw County, South Carolina Republican Party co-chair Jeff Mattox became embroiled in a controversy after he 'liked' a Cop Block video cross-posted on a Tea Party website. The controversy was reported on nationally at Politico.com. Mattox stated that he would not step down from his post after the controversy and stated that he had thought the Cop Block article had been an "interesting read."

On October 11, 2018, Cop Block became 1 of 559 pages and 251 accounts purged by Facebook for allegedly engaging in spam and "coordinated inauthentic activity" by creating "sensational political content...to build an audience and drive traffic to their websites."

== See also ==
- Bureaucrash
- Anti-police sentiment
- Police abolition movement
- Copwatch
- Glik v. Cunniffe
- Police misconduct
- Police accountability
- Photography is Not a Crime
- Government transparency
- First Amendment audits
