= Ademo =

Ademo may refer to:

- Euphorbia, a genus of spurges
- Ademo, a French rapper with PNL
- Ademo Freedman, founder of activist group Cop Block
