= First Amendment audit =

Primarily American social movement

A thumbnail picture of a First Amendment audit video on YouTube

First Amendment auditing is a primarily American social movement that involves photographing or filming in a public or publicly funded spaces like government buildings, seeking to provoke confrontations over the legality of their behavior. Practitioners, known as auditors, characterize the activity as activism or citizen journalism that promotes transparency and open government by testing constitutional rights—in particular the right to photograph and video record in public, a right normally covered by the First Amendment to the United States Constitution. Critics argue that audits are typically confrontational, and have criticized some tactics as forms of intimidation and harassment. Some opponents of auditors refer to auditors as "frauditors".

The practice is predominantly an American concept, since the First Amendment is a part of United States law, but similar practices take place elsewhere, including Australia, the United Kingdom, Canada, and Russia.

== Procedure ==
Self-styled auditors typically travel to places considered public property, such as sidewalks or public right-of-ways, or places open to the public, such as post offices, police stations, public libraries or other government buildings, and visibly and openly photograph and record buildings and persons in their view.

In sidewalk or easement audits, conflict might arise when a property owner or manager states that photography of their property is prohibited. Citizens typically have a constitutional right to record in open public spaces, as there is no reasonable expectation of privacy there. The laws regarding public forums come into play in these situations and are often the flashpoint of contention. Sometimes, auditors will tell property owners upon questioning that they are photographing or recording for a story, they are photographing or recording for their "personal use", or sometimes auditors do not answer questions.

Frequently, local law enforcement is called, and the auditor is sometimes reported as a suspicious person and is often also identified as having been on private property. Some officers will approach the auditors and request their identification and an explanation of their conduct. Auditors refusing to identify sometimes results in officers arresting auditors for obstruction of justice, disorderly conduct, or other crimes.

An auditor selects a public facility and then films the entire encounter with staff and customers alike. If no confrontation or attempt to stop the filming occurs, then the facility "passes" the audit. If an employee attempts to stop a filming event, it "fails" the audit.

== Purpose ==
Auditors describe their work as a form of grassroots accountability and constitutional testing. Their stated aim is to examine how government officials and law enforcement officers respond when citizens exercise legally protected but socially contested rights, such as openly filming in public spaces. By creating encounters in ordinary settings—post offices, libraries, police stations—auditors seek to demonstrate whether public servants will respect constitutional limits in practice, not just in theory. In a 2019 Fox News article, one auditor stated that the goal of an audit is to "put yourself in places where you know chances are the cops are going to be called. Are they going to uphold the constitution, uphold the law ... or break the law?"

Supporters view these audits as a continuation of the civil liberties tradition of “test cases” and public protest, in which individuals intentionally engage in protected but uncomfortable conduct to expose potential overreach of authority. By documenting these interactions and publishing them online, auditors argue they create an unfiltered check on government conduct and promote transparency where formal accountability mechanisms are perceived as weak or inaccessible.

Critics contend that some audits are motivated less by civil liberties concerns than by online notoriety or advertising revenue, which can encourage confrontational tactics designed to elicit dramatic responses. This has led to debate over whether the practice primarily functions as constitutional activism, performance for profit, or a mix of both.

== Reactions ==
=== Government response ===
Auditors have been detained, arrested, assaulted, had camera equipment confiscated, weapons aimed at them, their homes raided by SWAT teams, and have been shot while video recording in a public place. Such events have prompted police officials to release information on the proper methods of handling such an activity. For example, a document sponsored by the International Association of Chiefs of Police (IACP) states that the use of a recording device alone is not grounds for arrest, unless other laws are violated.

=== Support ===
Auditors believe that the movement promotes transparency and open government. They argue that auditing raises awareness of police misconduct and pressures government agencies to train their employees to respect First Amendment rights.

=== Criticism ===
Auditing has been controversial due to the tactics auditors have used in attempting to elicit potential reactions from police officers and private citizens alike. Many of these tactics have been criticized as they include the use of intimidation, harassment, and even criminal instigation.

Critics argue that audits are often confrontational in nature, as auditors often refuse to self-identify or explain their activities. Some auditors yell insults, derogatory language, and vulgarities at police officers who attempt to stop them from recording and insist on identification. Other auditors have also been known to enter public buildings asserting that they have a legal right to openly carry firearms (a right covered by the Second Amendment), leading to accusations that such auditors are engaged in intimidation and harassment.

The language and tactics of some auditors have also drawn criticism for being similar to those used by the anti-government sovereign citizen movement.

Critics have also noted that many auditors profit from the videos they publish on YouTube and other platforms. According to a report by The Daily Beast, the growing popularity of online auditing videos has led to "ruthless competition" among auditors, which has incentivized more dramatic, confrontational, and abusive videos.

== Legal status in the United States ==
The rights cited typically in audits are freedom of speech and freedom of the press in the First Amendment, freedom from unreasonable searches and seizures in the Fourth Amendment and the right to remain silent in the Fifth Amendment of the United States Constitution. In some cases, auditors have also faced charges such as harassment, resisting arrest, breach of peace, trespassing, or, less commonly, stalking or other offenses arising from confrontations during audits.

=== Public recording ===
The legality of recording police in public was first clearly established in a United States jurisdiction following the case of Glik v. Cunniffe in the United States Court of Appeals for the First Circuit, which confirmed that restricting a person's right to film in public would violate their First and Fourth Amendment rights. As of November 9, 2022, although the Supreme Court of the United States had yet to affirm a right to record government employees, it is on record declaring that there is a "paramount public interest in a free flow of information to the people concerning public officials."

As the Seventh Circuit Court of Appeals ruled in ACLU v. Alvarez, "the act of making an audio or audiovisual recording is necessarily included within the First Amendment's guarantee of speech and press rights as a corollary of the right to disseminate the resulting recording. The right to publish or broadcast an audio or audiovisual recording would be insecure, or largely ineffective, if the antecedent act of making the recording is wholly unprotected."

Bystanders may object to being filmed in public, but courts have generally held that, when in public spaces, people do not have a reasonable expectation that they will not be recorded on video.

=== Legal cases ===
Most federal appellate decisions addressing First Amendment audits arise in the context of civil rights lawsuits under Title 42 of the United States Code § 1983. In these cases, officers often invoke qualified immunity, which protects government officials from damages unless the constitutional right was "clearly established" at the time of the given incident. As a result, the main issue in much of the case law is not whether the First Amendment protects recording public officials, but whether that protection was clear enough in a particular jurisdiction and time period to overcome qualified immunity.

In its ruling on Glik v. Cunniffe (2011), the First Circuit was the first judicial body to address the issue, holding that a private citizen had a clearly established right to record police officers in a public park. The court reasoned that "the filming of government officials engaged in their duties in a public place … fits comfortably within [First Amendment] principles." As referenced above, in ACLU v. Alvarez, the Seventh Circuit similarly ruled that making audiovisual recordings of public officials is expressive conduct protected by the First Amendment, rejecting the argument that only publication is protected.

Other circuit courts have acknowledged the right to record public officials, but have granted qualified immunity to individual officers because there was no clear legal precedent at the time of the events. In Turner v. Driver (2017), a case brought by a self-described First Amendment auditor who was detained while filming outside a police station, the justices of the Fifth Circuit ruled that recording police is protected under the First Amendment but determined that the officers involved were entitled to immunity because the right was not clearly established in the Fifth Circuit until that decision. In Fields v. City of Philadelphia (2017), which involved citizens recording police officers during public events, the appeals court for the Third Circuit recognized the right to record but granted qualified immunity to the officers because the law had not been clearly established at the time.

By contrast, later cases have denied qualified immunity where prior circuit precedent had already established the right. In Irizarry v. Yehia (2022), another case brought by a First Amendment auditor, the Tenth Circuit Court of Appeals ruled that "there is a First Amendment right to film the police performing their duties in public", concluding that the right was clearly established by 2019 (making qualified immunity unavailable).

As of September 5, 2025, at least seven federal appellate courts—the United States courts of appeals for the First, Third, Fifth, Seventh, Ninth, Tenth, and Eleventh Circuits—have acknowledged the First Amendment right to record public officials performing their duties in public. These decisions collectively protect Americans' right to record public officials in more than thirty states.

Other circuits have declined to recognize the right to record as clearly established, often resolving cases on qualified immunity grounds. The United States Court of Appeals for the Eighth Circuit, in Molina v. Book (2022), held that two legal observers who recorded police activity during a protest engaged in protected activity, but concluded that officers were entitled to qualified immunity because the right to record was not clearly established in the Eighth Circuit in 2015.

Similarly, the Fourth Circuit justices have not definitively ruled on the issue. In Sharpe v. Winterville Police Department (2023), the court held that live-streaming a traffic stop is expressive conduct under the First Amendment, but it remanded the case on qualified immunity grounds without deciding whether the right to record was clearly established within the circuit.

Because most of these cases arise in damages suits under 42 U.S.C. § 1983, the scope of civil liability often depends less on whether a constitutional right exists in the abstract than on whether that right was "clearly established" in the jurisdiction at the time of the recording. Courts have also emphasized that the right is subject to traditional time, place, and manner restrictions, and that it does not immunize otherwise unlawful conduct like trespassing, obstruction, or harassment.

State law can also be narrower than auditors have claimed. In 2023 Sean Paul Reyes, a First Amendment auditor, sued the City of New York after he was arrested for filming inside New York City Police Department precinct lobbies. A federal district court granted him a preliminary injunction that year. On June 23, 2026, the New York Court of Appeals held that New York's state and city right-to-record statutes do not confer a right to record law enforcement activities inside police stationhouses, including lobbies open to the public. The court relied on the statutory text, the legislative history, and concerns about the privacy and safety of crime victims, witnesses, informants, and undercover officers.

=== Time, place, and manner restrictions ===
Numerous court cases, most notably the case of Glik v. Cunniffe, have also concluded that filming protections are subject to time, place, and manner restrictions, including in the majority of public buildings. Limitations include (but are not limited to) trespassing on public or private property, entering an established crime scene (whether marked or unmarked by crime scene tape or other methods), and materially interfering with police activities. The United States Supreme Court case of Grayned v. City of Rockford (1972) clarified and defined the parameters of time, place, and manner restrictions and is often cited when removing First Amendment auditors who violate its guidelines. Conversely, it is also cited in protecting First Amendment auditors who act within its parameters.

=== Insults ===
While insulting the police is usually treated as constitutionally protected speech, in some jurisdictions it can be considered disorderly conduct, and if it interferes with a police interaction can also lead to charges of obstructing police or interfering with police in the performance of their duties. According to a guide published by the IACP, "verbal criticism and derisive comments made by recording parties or others from a location that has no direct impact on police operations or safety are not actionable by themselves."

An auditor in San Antonio was prosecuted and convicted of disorderly conduct after an audit where he "chased, jostled and shouted insults at three officers on duty". After the trial, the Chief of Police for the City of San Antonio stated "[the verdict] almost puts a dagger in the heart of their First Amendment excuse and verbally attacking police officers".

== See also ==
- Copwatch
- Photography Is Not a Crime
