= Adam Müller (disambiguation) =

Adam Müller is a German publicist, literary critic, political economist and theorist.

Adam Müller or Mueller may refer to:

- Adam August Müller, Danish history painter
- Adam "Ademo Freeman" Mueller, cofounder of Cop Block
