= Maryland v. Graber =

American wrongly charged of a felony

This is a court decision about the rights of Anthony Graber, an American who was charged, in 2010, with felony violation of Maryland wiretapping law for undisclosed recording of his roadside receipt of a speeding ticket from a plainclothes police officer.

If convicted, he would have faced up to 16 years imprisonment, after having his home searched and property seized. Graber (born c. 1985) was a staff sergeant for the Maryland Air National Guard, with two young children at the time of his arrest.

== Incident ==
In March 2010, Graber was speeding on his motorcycle, swerving across traffic lanes, and did at least one wheelie on Interstate 95 while recording with a video camera on his helmet. He was cut off by an unmarked gray sedan. A man in jeans and a sweatshirt exited the vehicle and with gun drawn commanded Graber to get off his motorcycle. The man, Maryland State Trooper Joseph D. Uhler, dressed in plain clothes, then identified himself as "State Police", and cited Graber with a moving violation for 80 mph in a 65 mph zone. Uhler's badge, which was located on his belt, was not immediately visible in the video until Uhler holstered his firearm.

On March 10, Graber posted the video of the encounter on YouTube. Prosecutors obtained a grand jury indictment charging Graber with violation of Maryland wiretap laws for audio recording of the officer without his consent.

On April 8, police searched Graber's residence and seized the camera, thumb drives, external hard drives, and four computers. Graber was not arrested at that time because he had just had gall bladder surgery. When he turned himself in a week later he was arrested and spent 26 hours in jail.

On June 1, he was arraigned in Harford County Circuit Court in Bel Air. He was charged with four felonies and faced a maximum of 16 years in prison if convicted on all charges.

== Outcome ==
On July 7, 2010, the Maryland Attorney General Douglas Gansler released an opinion advising a state legislator that, contrary to the claims of Harford County State's Attorney Joseph Cassilly, a traffic stop is not an instance where a police officer can claim a reasonable expectation of privacy.

On September 27, 2010, criminal charges against Graber were dropped. The court threw out the charge of "recording illegal activity" on the grounds that, construed narrowly to avoid an unconstitutional application of the statute, the law did not apply to bar what Graber did. The judge noted that "the video taping of public events is protected under the First Amendment." The judge ruled that Maryland's wire tap law does not prohibit recording of voice or sound in areas where privacy cannot be expected and that a police officer on a traffic stop has no legal expectation of privacy. Overall, Harford County Circuit Court Judge Emory A Plitt Jr. dismissed four of the seven charges filed against Anthony Graber, leaving only traffic code violations.

Those of us who are public officials and are entrusted with the power of the state are ultimately accountable to the public. When we exercise that power in public fora, we should not expect our actions to be shielded from public observation.

— Judge Emory A. Plitt, Jr., Maryland v. Graber

== See also ==
- Glik v. Cunniffe
