= Bureaucrash =

American libertarian activist group (2001–)

- Logo of the project
- Formation: 2001
- Purpose: Libertarian Activism
- Headquarters: Washington DC
- Region served: International
- Parent organization: Competitive Enterprise Institute

Bureaucrash was an international network of libertarian activists whose stated goals were "decreasing the scope of government" and "increasing individual freedom", and which engaged in culture jamming.

== History ==
Bureaucrash was founded in 2001 by businessman Al Rosenberg and the Henry Hazlitt Foundation in an attempt to use the Internet to spread what the group calls "pro-freedom" ideals. The following year, the Henry Hazlitt Foundation went out of business and was absorbed into the International Society for Individual Liberty. Bureaucrash survived its parent organization, and in March 2006, an interview with then "Crasher-in-Chief" Jason Talley, on the Competitive Enterprise Institute's website, stated that "In March, Bureaucrash and CEI formed a new strategic partnership to combine the strengths of each organization to help spread the ideas of liberty."

Initially, Bureaucrash pitched itself as "a network of guerrilla activists who oppose the growing disease of the bureaucratic state" and emphasized that "we come from all backgrounds and ideologies, but share in common a conviction that the bloated administrative government is the greatest threat to our freedom, creativity and sense of choice." The following year the group's website was more explicit about its political slant stating that it "develops full scale campaigns and web resources for libertarian guerilla activism."

Following Jason Talley's departure from the position of "Crasher-in-Chief," friend and fellow activist Pete Eyre became the new head of the organization until his departure in early 2009 to take part in a new project, the Motorhome Diaries: Searching for freedom in America. Not coincidentally, Talley later worked with Eyre on the Motorhome Diaries. Eyre had previously worked at the Institute for Humane Studies, the Drug Policy Alliance and as an intern at the Cato Institute.

== Activism ==
Past actions by "crashers" have taken the form of holding counterdemonstrations at key progressive events and filming themselves either with provocative placards or interacting with the attendees. At a March 2001 rally against a speech by David Horowitz at the University of California, Berkeley, 'crashers staged a counter-protest on free speech grounds. Actions have included demonstrating against the 2003 invasion of Iraq, picketing the World Health Organization conference with the message that capitalism saves lives, throwing powdered chalk on The Yes Men after The Yes Men failed in an attempt to infiltrate the Cato Institute, and demonstrating at the movie Sicko to protest against socialized medical systems. Bureaucrash took part in Tea Party protests on July 4 and the July 17th protest against health care reform. Bureaucrash is listed as a co-sponsor for Glenn Beck’s inaugural 9-12 Project march in Washington DC.

== Perception ==
Libertarian historian Brian Doherty described Bureaucrash in Radicals for Capitalism as "a gang of libertarian college kids who prank leftists at major international events by taking the implications of their policies to absurd extremes, which invariably fails, often spectacularly. Bureaucrash created a fake group it called 'Progressives Against Progress' whose symbol was a caveman with a club."

Bureaucrash was called a group "where punk rock meets the gold standard" in The Wall Street Journal.

The network's work has been favorably showcased by prominent British libertarian blog Samizdata.
