= Ballot selfie =

Photographer's completed election ballot

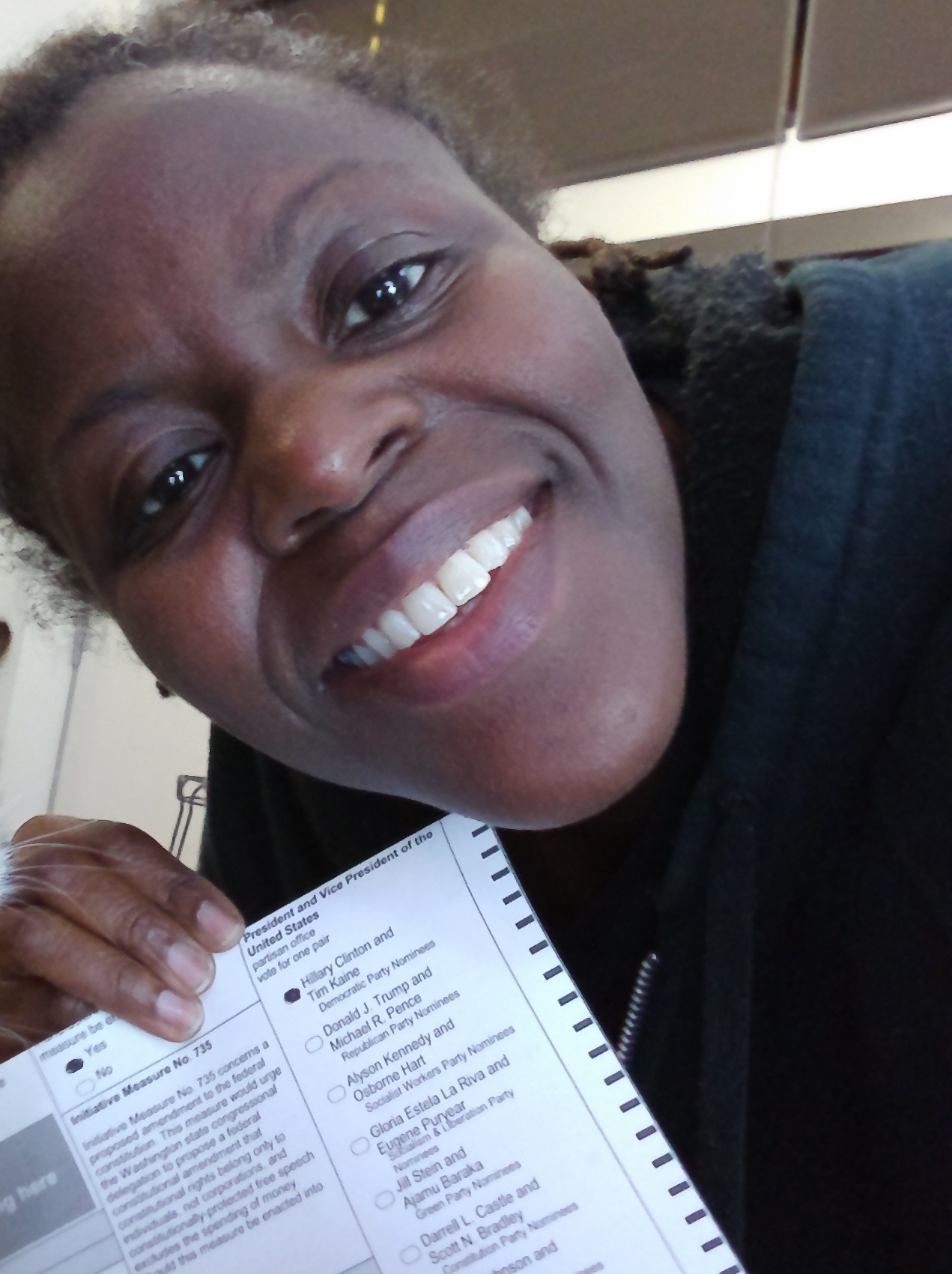
Example of a ballot selfie from the 2016 United States elections marked for Hillary Clinton

A ballot selfie is a type of selfie that is intended to depict the photographer's completed ballot in an election, as a way of showing how the photographer cast their vote. Ballot selfies have risen in prominence alongside the increasing availability of smartphone digital cameras and the use of social media in the 21st century. They have also generated controversy as potential violations of laws enacted in the late 19th and early 20th centuries to curtail vote buying, particularly in the United States, although some U.S. courts have rejected restrictions on ballot selfies as inconsistent with the U.S. Constitution's First Amendment guarantees of freedom of speech.

Voters typically take and share ballot selfies to encourage others to vote, to demonstrate their civic involvement, and to express their choice of candidate. The selfie is often taken in or near a voting booth and the ballot paper is often marked. Others do not take pictures of themselves in the voting booth, but photograph their ballots (including absentee ballots) or the voting machines, either before or after filling them out.

== Issues ==
Several concerns have arisen over ballot selfies, typically focused on issues of ballot secrecy, voter fraud, and voter intimidation. These have led to laws prohibiting or restricting ballot selfies in some places, or the application or revision of existing laws to cover the practice, although enforcement has not been widespread in U.S. jurisdictions. Some authorities have indicated that prosecution would be unlikely unless there was some indication that the photograph was associated with voter fraud or intimidation or a vote-buying scheme.

== Legality ==
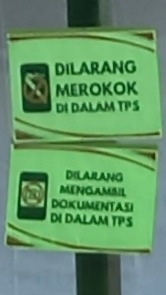
"No photography" sign to prevent ballot selfie during the 2024 Indonesian general election

Laws regarding ballot selfies vary by country and jurisdiction, often with laws varying by jurisdiction even within a country.

=== Brazil ===
Brazil's election laws ensure the secrecy of the vote; therefore, taking any photos of the voting machine (or, for that matter, using any electronic device while voting) is a crime subject to prison and a fine of up to R$15 thousand.

=== Canada ===
Elections Canada has encouraged voters to take selfies outside polling stations but cautioned against photos of marked ballots, as the Canada Elections Act makes it illegal to "show [a] ballot, when marked".

=== Germany ===
In federal elections for the Bundestag, taking a ballot selfie in the voting booth was prohibited in 2017 to preserve ballot secrecy and make vote buying and voter intimidation more difficult. If the voting commission notices a voter taking a ballot selfie, the ballot paper is not accepted. The voter will then be given a new ballot paper on request after destroying the old one.

=== Republic of Ireland ===
In the Republic of Ireland, laws regarding the secret ballot are strict: one government website warns that "if you take selfies or post pictures online that reveal who you, or someone else, voted for, you could be prosecuted." The Department of the Environment, Climate and Communications warns that "taking photographs and the sharing of any photograph of a ballot paper marked at an election or a referendum could have the potential to compromise the integrity and secrecy of a ballot and may constitute an offence." Therefore, one could void one's vote, and/or receive a fine.

=== The Netherlands ===
Ballot selfies are called stemfies in Dutch, literally "votefies". A platform for the protection of the rights of civilians sued the Dutch government in 2014 when minister of the interior and kingdom relations Ronald Plasterk said "I won't encourage anyone to take a ballot selfie, but it is allowed". The judge ruled that there is no law regarding ballot selfies and that it would not be up to the judge to say if it was wise of the minister to make statements the way he did.

=== United Kingdom ===
Photography inside polling stations is prohibited and can result in fines of up to £5,000 or prison terms of six months. However, photography of postal ballots is allowed.

=== United States ===
Legality of ballot selfies by state, including the District of Columbia and Puerto Rico. Legal Only absentee ballots Illegal Unclear

In the United States, there is no federal law regarding ballot selfies, leaving the matter to the individual states. Some U.S. states prohibit ballot selfies, imposing fines or jail terms for violations, while other states have no prohibition. In some states, laws prohibit photography at a polling place but do not restrict photographs of absentee ballots.

The American Civil Liberties Union and others have questioned the constitutionality of prohibiting ballot selfies, arguing that they violate the First Amendment's free speech guarantee. Others, such as election-law expert Richard L. Hasen, consider such statutes to be "narrowly tailored ... to prevent vote buying" and thus constitutional, and argue that "without the ballot-selfie ban, we could see the reemergence of the buying and selling of votes — and even potential coercion from employers, union bosses and others." Supporters of ballot selfies, by contrast, argue that the taking and sharing of such photos is positive for democracy; for example, law professor Paul Bender has suggested that selfies might increase voter turnout.

In Tennessee, entertainer Justin Timberlake came under fire for a ballot selfie he took, though the state did not take legal action.

==== Constitutional challenges against bans ====
Indiana's ban was enjoined on October 19, 2015 by a preliminary injunction by the U.S. District Court for the Southern District of Indiana.

New Hampshire's ban on ballot selfies was ruled facially unconstitutional by the U.S. Court of Appeals for the First Circuit in September 2016 in the case Rideout v. Gardner. The case was brought by the ACLU, with the support of the Reporters Committee for Freedom of the Press and Snapchat, which were among the groups filing amicus briefs in support of the challenge. The court held that the statute's stated justification, to prevent vote-buying or voter coercion, was not sufficient to sustain the restriction on speech, because "digital photography, the Internet, and social media are not unknown quantities -- they have been ubiquitous for several election cycles, without being shown to have the effect of furthering vote buying or voter intimidation." The court thus determined that New Hampshire's law "is facially unconstitutional even applying only intermediate scrutiny" due to the "substantial mismatch between New Hampshire's objectives and the ballot-selfie prohibition." The state sought review by the Supreme Court, but in April 2017 the Court refused to hear the case, leaving the First Circuit's decision intact.

Michigan's ban was enjoined by a preliminary injunction in late October 2016 by the U.S. District Court for the Western District of Michigan, but that injunction was stayed in early November 2016 by the U.S. Court of Appeals for the Sixth Circuit, in the case Crookston v. Johnston, which in a 2-1 decision allowed the ban to remain in place. On May 8, 2019 the Michigan Secretary of State settled the case. Michigan now allows for taking pictures of your ballot inside the voting booth, but not pictures of yourself with a marked ballot.

New York's ban on photographing and displaying marked ballots, first enacted in 1890, was upheld in a September 2017 decision in the case Silberberg v. Board of Elections by the U.S. District Court for the Southern District of New York. Applying strict scrutiny, the court held that the state had a compelling interest in preventing vote buying and voter coercion and that the law was narrowly tailored to meet this interest.

==== Laws by state ====
Most state laws making it a crime to photograph marked ballots were enacted as reform efforts in the early 20th century, as part of a broader campaign that saw the introduction of the secret ballot and the enactment of "other laws intended to prevent voter corruption and intimidation." Many such Progressive Era laws remain in force today. The "outright buying of votes has receded as a significant issue" although there are some occasional prosecutions.

Jurisdictions that currently prohibit ballot selfies are Alabama, Alaska, Florida, Georgia, Illinois, Kansas, Massachusetts, Mississippi, Nevada, New Jersey, New Mexico, New York, North Carolina, South Carolina, South Dakota, Texas, and Wisconsin. Illinois's laws are the strictest of all; while most states with anti-ballot selfie laws make the offense a misdemeanor punishable by a fine, taking a ballot selfie in Illinois is a felony punishable by 1–3 years in prison.

Jurisdictions that currently allow ballot selfies or do not enforce laws against them are California, Colorado, Connecticut, Hawaii, Idaho, Indiana, Kentucky, Louisiana, Maine, Minnesota, Montana, Nebraska, New Hampshire, North Dakota, Oregon, Rhode Island, Utah, Vermont, Virginia, Washington, Wyoming, and the District of Columbia.

Jurisdictions where the law is currently unclear are Arizona, Arkansas, Delaware, Iowa, Maryland, Missouri, Ohio, Oklahoma, Pennsylvania, Tennessee, and West Virginia.

=== South Africa ===
In South Africa, it is a violation of the Electoral Act to photograph a marked ballot. South Africa's Independent Electoral Commission takes a hardline approach toward marked ballot selfies, threatening jail time for anyone found taking one.
