= Sean Paul Reyes =

American YouTuber and First Amendment auditor

SeanPaul Reyes
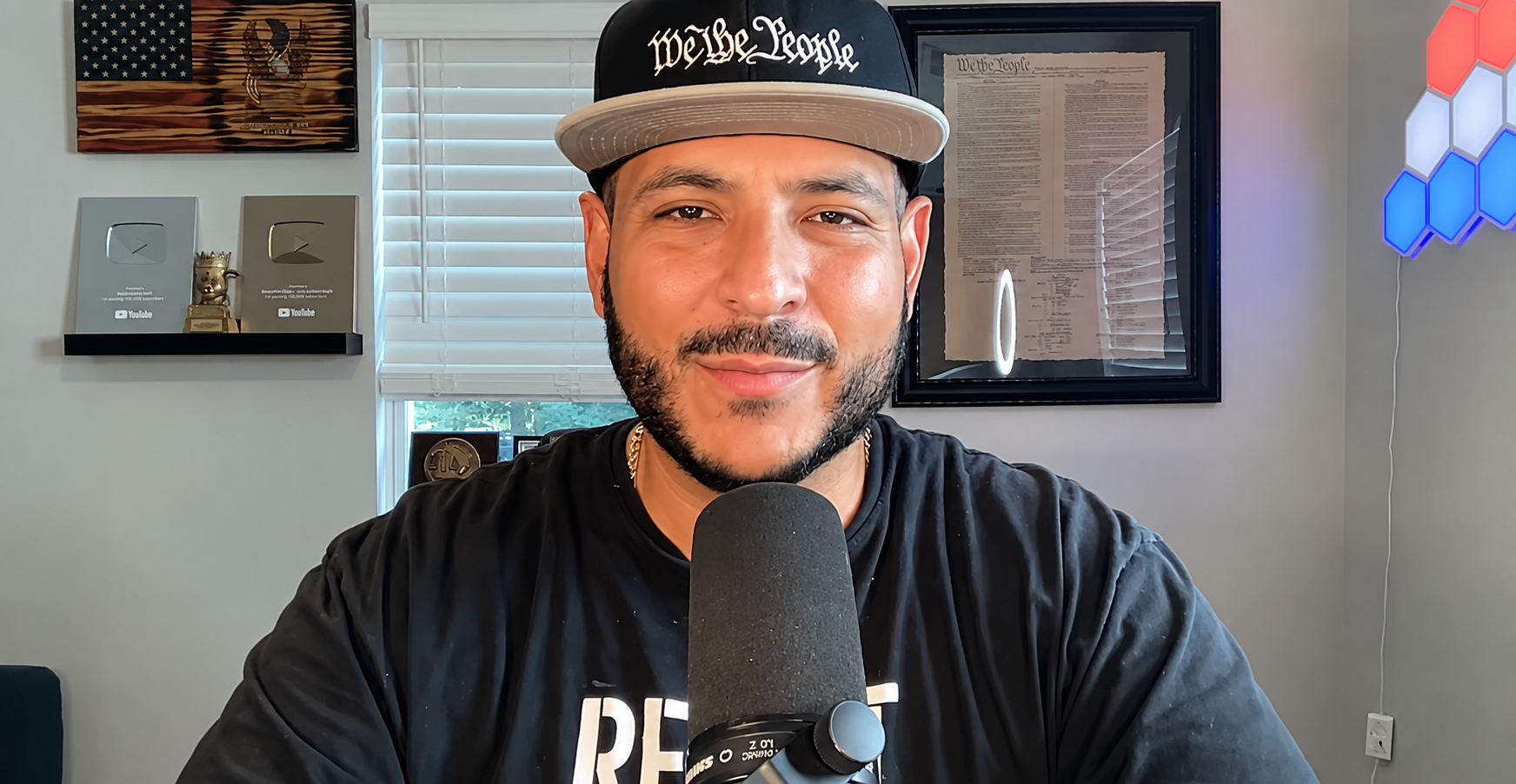
- Occupation: YouTuber

YouTube information
- Channel: Long Island Audit
- Years active: 2021–present
- Genre: First Amendment audits
- Subscribers: 1.04 million
- Last updated: September 3, 2026
- Website: longislandaudit.com

SeanPaul Reyes (/ʃɔːn pɔːl ˈreɪz/), also known as Long Island Audit, is an American YouTuber who records encounters with police officers, government employees and public officials as part of the First Amendment auditing movement. He has been described as an independent journalist. In 2023 he sued the City of New York over a New York Police Department policy barring recording inside police precincts. A federal district court granted him a preliminary injunction that year. On June 23, 2026, the New York Court of Appeals held that state and city right-to-record statutes do not confer a right to record inside police stationhouses, including lobbies open to the public. His recordings have also led to other criminal cases and civil lawsuits.

== Early life and career ==
Reyes has said that he previously worked as a logistics director for a cosmetics manufacturing company on Long Island. He stated that he lost that job during the COVID-19 pandemic.

He then began producing videos focused on government accountability and constitutional rights.

== Long Island Audit ==
The logo of the Long Island Audit channel

Reyes launched the Long Island Audit YouTube channel in March 2021. The channel publishes videos of his recordings at government facilities and of his encounters with public employees.

As of September 2026, the channel had about 1.04 million subscribers and more than 2,000 videos. Reyes has said that Long Island Audit's broader audience across social media platforms is more than two million. That figure is self-reported and has not been independently audited.

Long Island Audit, Inc. is a New York corporation incorporated on August 25, 2021. The Better Business Bureau lists Sean Paul Reyes as the founder and classifies the firm as a social impact business. The BBB profile states that the company is not accredited and has a B-minus rating for failure to respond to a complaint. A BBB rating is a bureau score. It is not a court finding and is not evidence of wrongdoing.

== Activism and First Amendment auditing ==
First Amendment auditing is a practice in which participants record public employees or government facilities to test how officials respond to recording in public places. Auditors typically argue that the activity is protected by the First Amendment and that recording increases government accountability.

Supporters of the practice describe auditors as watchdogs who test whether officers understand constitutional limits on their authority. Critics argue that some audits are staged to provoke confrontations and can expose individual employees, bystanders and police witnesses to unwanted publicity. Legal disputes involving Reyes have often turned on whether a location is a public place, a restricted government facility or private property.

== Legal cases ==
=== Reyes v. City of New York ===
In 2023 Reyes was arrested after filming inside a New York Police Department precinct lobby and declining to stop or leave after officers cited an NYPD policy prohibiting recording inside police facilities. The charges were later dismissed. He was arrested a second time at a different precinct.

Reyes sued the City of New York, alleging that the NYPD policy violated the First Amendment, New York's Right to Record Act and New York City's Right to Record Act. LatinoJustice PRLDEF represented him.

In November 2023, the United States District Court for the Southern District of New York granted Reyes a preliminary injunction. The order restrained the NYPD from enforcing the precinct-lobby recording policy against Reyes to the extent that the policy conflicted with applicable recording laws.

In June 2025 the United States Court of Appeals for the Second Circuit certified a question of New York law to the New York Court of Appeals. The question was whether state or city right-to-record laws protect video recording in police station lobbies that are accessible to the public.

On June 23, 2026, the New York Court of Appeals held that the statutes do not confer a right to record law enforcement activities inside police stationhouses, including lobbies accessible to the public. The court based the holding on the statutory text, the legislative history and concerns about the privacy and safety of crime victims, witnesses, informants and undercover officers. The decision answered the certified state-law question in the negative. It did not itself dispose of every federal First Amendment claim in the litigation.

=== Danbury City Hall case ===
Reyes was found guilty of simple trespass for filming inside Danbury City Hall in Connecticut. He was found not guilty of creating a public disturbance and was fined $90. The verdict followed a trial in Connecticut Superior Court in 2023. The charges arose from a July 2021 incident in which staff and police questioned him while he was filming. He had pleaded not guilty to the charges.

=== Schenectady recording request ===
In 2024 a Schenectady court denied Reyes's request to record his own criminal proceeding. The court concluded that such recording would interfere with the fair administration of justice. The case was listed as People v. Reyes, docket number CR-1769-24.

=== Groton trespass case ===
In July 2025 Reyes arrived at the Groton, Connecticut, home of Bryan Fahey, a sergeant with the Connecticut State Police. News reports said Reyes was investigating Fahey's salary and overtime, including more than $212,000 in overtime earnings reported for 2024.

News reports said Fahey was armed and accused Reyes of trespassing. Reyes said he was working as a journalist and did not see a "no trespassing" sign. He was arrested on July 11, 2025. The initial charges included voyeurism with malice, first-degree criminal trespass and second-degree breach of the peace. The voyeurism charge was later dismissed and the remaining charges were reduced or replaced. By December 2025 Reyes was reported to face a misdemeanor charge of third-degree criminal trespass. He was free on a $75,000 bond.

In August 2026 Reyes testified in his own defense. He said he was doing journalism and had not seen a "no trespassing" sign. The prosecution focused on whether he entered the property without permission or remained there after being told to leave.

On September 3, 2026, Judge Cody N. Guarnieri of the Connecticut Superior Court in Danielson found Reyes guilty of third-degree criminal trespass, a class C misdemeanor. The judge sentenced Reyes to a 90-day jail term that was suspended and one year of probation. The court also issued standing criminal protective orders covering each member of the Fahey family through 2099. Reyes said he intended to appeal.

=== Suffolk County Police Benevolent Association case ===
In June 2026 Reyes arrived at the Suffolk County Police Benevolent Association headquarters in Brentwood, New York, in a billboard truck displaying reports of police misconduct. Reyes questioned the union about officers who had pleaded guilty but remained on the force until they were eligible for pension benefits.

The PBA said Reyes entered or remained on private property after being ordered to leave. Suffolk County police arrested Reyes and charged him with third-degree criminal trespass. Police issued Reyes a desk appearance ticket. PBA President Lou Civello said Reyes was arrested after Reyes was asked repeatedly to leave. Reyes disputed that account and said police arrested him while he was leaving.

In July 2026 prosecutors dropped the criminal charge. Reporting described the case as first reduced from a misdemeanor and later dismissed as a criminal charge.

=== Other litigation ===
Reyes has been the plaintiff in federal civil cases in the United States District Court for the Northern District of Illinois, including Reyes v. Volanti and Reyes v. Bassi.

Reyes filed a defamation lawsuit against Paul Alfrey, the mayor of Melbourne, Florida. The dispute followed Reyes's appearance at a Melbourne City Council meeting, where Reyes criticized Alfrey. Alfrey later released a statement that cited harassment and death threats. Alfrey included screenshots of messages he said he had received. Reyes said he had not threatened Alfrey and that the messages came from other people. In June 2026 a Brevard County circuit judge dismissed the case with prejudice.

== Controversies ==
Critics have said Reyes's videos often involve confrontational encounters and can blur the line between journalism and protest. Supporters have said officers should understand the law and should not retaliate against people who record in public places.

Privacy and safety concerns in precinct lobbies were central to the NYPD lawsuit. As noted above, the New York Court of Appeals cited those concerns in holding that the right-to-record statutes do not apply inside police stationhouses.

Reyes has been criticized for approaching public officials at private residences and remaining on the property after being asked to leave. Reporting on the Groton case and the Suffolk County PBA case has focused on the distinction between recording in a public place and remaining on private property.

After Reyes released video of the PBA encounter, Civello told the New York Post that he had received death threats. The reporting did not establish that Reyes made or directed the threats.
