= Henry Hazlitt Foundation =

American libertarian group (1997–2002)

The Henry Hazlitt Foundation was a public interest or advocacy organization founded in 1997 by Chris Whitten, who had been publishing Free-Market.com since 1995. The Foundation was named after free-market economist and writer Henry Hazlitt. In 1997 Free-Market.com became Free-Market.Net: The Freedom Network for the express purpose of making the ideas of liberty more accessible and networking with the international libertarian movement. J.D. Tuccille (the son of Jerome Tuccille) served as senior editor for Free-Market.net.

== History ==
The Foundation ran a number of features, including book of the month, website of the week, and an offline newsletter entitled The Free-Marketeer. It was also responsible for the creation or maintenance of a number of libertarian organizations, such as ifeminists and Bureaucrash. The idea for Bureaucrash came from businessman Al Rosenberg, who partnered with the Henry Hazlitt Foundation in 2001. In December 2002, the Henry Hazlitt Foundation went out of business. Free-Market.Net became part of the International Society for Individual Liberty in December 2004 and appears in ISIL's successor's online archives several times.

== Funding ==
Between 1998 and 2003 the Henry Hazlitt Foundation received six grants totaling $52,500.
