= Photography Is Not a Crime =

American news website

PINAC News
- Website type: News
- Available in: English
- Owners: PINAC News, Inc.
- Creator: Carlos Miller
- Website: pinacnews.com
- Commercial: Yes
- Registration: Optional
- Launched: 2007
- Current status: Inactive as of Dec. 2022.

Photography Is Not a Crime (PINAC, published under the trade name PINAC News) was an organization and news website that focused on rights of civilians who photograph and film police and other government organizations in the United States. It was founded in 2007 following the arrest of its creator, Carlos Miller, a veteran news reporter and photojournalist, and incorporated in June 2014 as PINAC Inc., a Florida not-for-profit corporation. In December 2022 Carlos Miller declared the site dead.

== Origin ==
In early 2007, Miller was on assignment for an article about the Biscayne Boulevard area of Miami, Florida. He observed five police officers interviewing an individual and began to take photographs. The officers asked Miller to move on, but he refused, informing them that he was on public property, where he held the right to photograph. The officers then arrested him for numerous misdemeanor offenses, including resisting arrest. (Note: Miller was later acquitted of all charges except the resisting arrest charge, and that charge was overturned on appeal. Miller was supported during the trial by the Society of Professional Journalists, who contributed $3,000 towards his defense.) Miller claims he was beaten by the officers during his arrest. Miller created the blog as a result of his arrest, the freedom of the press and free speech violations by the Miami Police Department, and his desire to educate the public on the issue of the right of Americans to document the activities of public officials in the performance of their duties.

== First Amendment issues ==
PINAC focuses on First Amendment issues that intersect with governmental oppression of those rights, normally by police officers. It also gives civilians tips on how to interact with the police and assert their constitutionally protected rights.

=== General arrests ===
Police departments have harassed or made arrests of civilian photographers for charges such as obstruction and making terror threats.

=== Wiretapping arrests ===
PINAC has covered a number of cases during which police officers have misused wiretapping laws against civilians such as Anthony Graber in Maryland. Graber was arrested after he posted a video of a police contact on YouTube. (Note: The use of wiretapping laws to suppress photographers clearly violate the First Amendment, and courts have noted that public officers in a public place have no expectation of privacy.)

=== Homeland security ===
In addition, there have been numerous examples in which police or security officers have erroneously told civilians that filming or taking pictures of a particular building is unlawful and a violation, due to either national security or homeland security reasons. Examples covered in the blog include a police officer advising that photographing the National Laboratory at the University of Texas Medical Branch was prohibited, and similar examples involving photographing an art exhibit in downtown Indianapolis, and a train station in New York City.

=== Police seizure of footage ===
PINAC has documented a number of cases in which police officers seized cameras and cell phones or deleted photographs or video, apparently in an effort to cover up police misconduct, such as in the killing of Oscar Grant by BART Police officers. In some cases, police have been accused of tampering with evidence by deleting photographs or videos. For example, in Broward County, an off-duty deputy sheriff pulled over a motorist, and then illegally seized and destroyed her cell phone in an attempt to get rid of the video that she had taken of police misconduct.

On August 2, 2021, five Miami Beach police officers were charged with using excessive force against a bystander who recorded video of the officers beating a handcuffed suspect.

== Recognition ==
The blog has been featured or discussed mainstream publications including Playboy, The Washington Post, The Boston Globe and the Fort Lauderdale Sun-Sentinel. It made ABC News when Andrew Meyer joined as a staff writer in 2014.

PINAC was cited in law reviews including the Tennessee Law Review, the Quinnipiac Law Review, and the University of Pennsylvania Law Review.

== See also ==
- Photography and the law
- Legality of recording by civilians
- Chilling effect
- First Amendment audits
- Freedom of the press in the United States
- Police accountability
