= Photography and the law =

Legal status of photography, including intellectual property and privacy laws

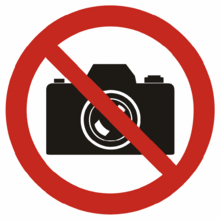
A "No Photography" sign, commonly placed in properties where taking photographs is illegal or objected to by the owner (though in some jurisdictions, this is not a legal requirement)

The intellectual property rights on photographs are protected in different jurisdictions by the laws governing copyright and moral rights. In some cases photography may be restricted by civil or criminal law. Publishing certain photographs can be restricted by privacy or other laws. Photography can be generally restricted in the interests of public morality and the protection of children.

Reactions to photography differ between societies, and even where there are no official restrictions there may be objections to photographing people or places. Reactions may range from complaints to violence for photography which is not illegal.

== Australia ==
=== General ===
Australia's laws in relation to this matter are similar to that of the United States. In Australia you can generally photograph anything or anyone in a public place without permission assuming that it isn't being used in an otherwise illegal way such as defamation and does not contain copyrighted material. Furthermore photographing in a place where people would reasonably expect to be afforded privacy such as in a public restroom may also be illegal.

=== Private property ===
While one can generally photograph private property and the people within it if the photographer is not within the bounds of the private property and cannot be asked to stop or delete the images, the owner can restrict recording whilst the photographer is on the private property. Failure to comply with orders to stop recording on the private property is not a criminal offence although it may be against the terms or policy of entrance and the photographer may be asked to leave; if they refuse to leave, they may be liable for trespassing.

=== Publishing and rights ===
The photographer generally has full rights of the images meaning they can publish it to places such as social media without permission from the people in the image. However, there are exceptions in the following scenarios:

- A breach of the Privacy Act 1988
- Was taken while trespassing on private property
- A breach of duty, such as sharing confidential information

A photographer can generally also not be forced to show or delete the images unless the photographic practices were at breach of the law.

=== Commercial purposes ===
If you are seeking to photograph for commercial purposes you may be required to gain permission from anyone who was involved in the film or photograph. Commercial purposes usually means that you are photographing for financial gain or to promote goods or services.

== United Kingdom ==
=== Legal restrictions on photography ===
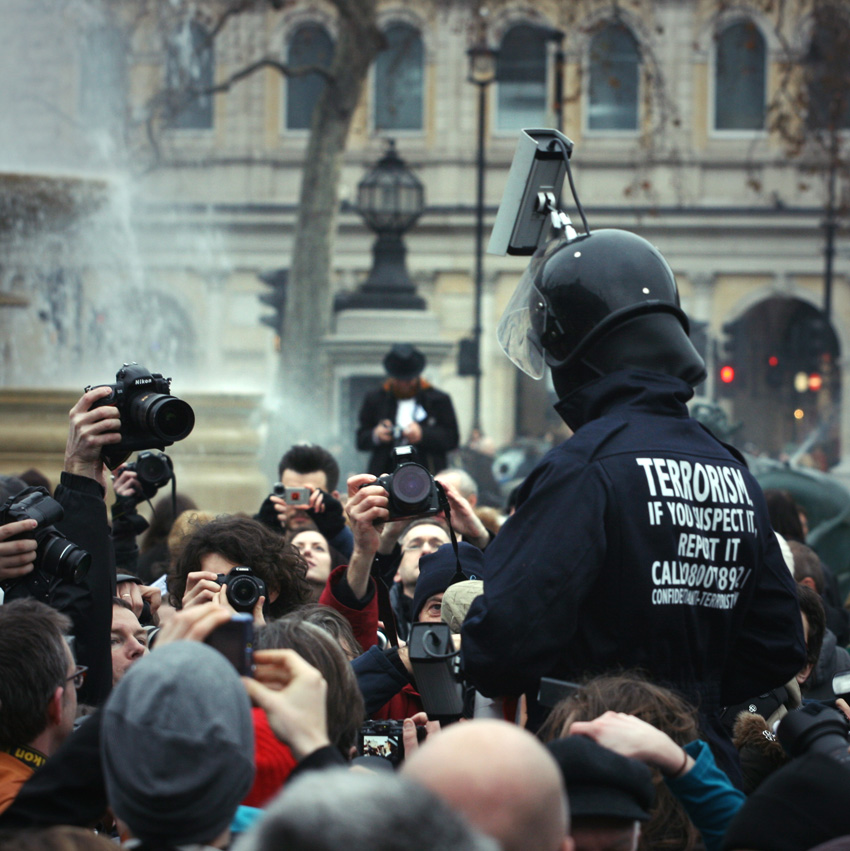
Mass photo gathering in the UK

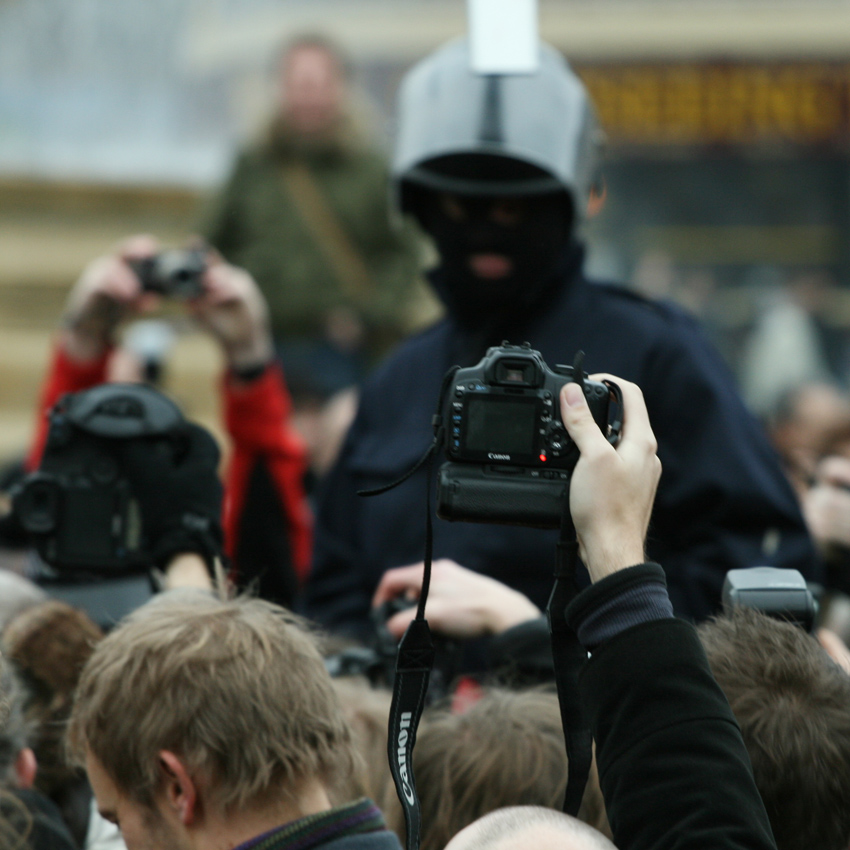
Mass photo gathering in the UK

In the United Kingdom there are no laws forbidding photography of private property from a public place. Photography is not restricted on land if the landowner has given permission to be on the land or the photographer has legal right to access, for example Byways Open to All Traffic or a public right of way or an area of open access land. The Metropolitan Police state in their own advice "Members of the public and the media do not need a permit to film or photograph in public places and police have no power to stop them filming or photographing incidents or police personnel". The IAC, Film and Video Institute recommends that one follows instruction given by police as there may be a reason/reasons for not filming, ignorance of said law(s) notwithstanding. An exception is an area that has prohibitions detailed within anti terrorism legislation. Civil proceeding can be taken if a person is filmed without consent, and privacy laws exist to protect a person where they can expect privacy. Two public locations in the UK, Trafalgar Square and Parliament Square, have a specific provision against photography for commercial purposes without the written permission of the Mayor or the Squares' Management Team and paying a fee, and permission is needed to photograph or film for commercial purposes in the Royal Parks or on any National Trust land.

Persistent and aggressive photography of a single individual may come under the legal definition of harassment.

It is contempt of court to take a photograph in any court of law of any person, being a judge of the court or a juror or a witness in or a party to any proceedings before the court, whether civil or criminal, or to publish such a photograph. This includes photographs taken in a court building or the precincts of the court. Taking a photograph in a court can be seen as a serious offence, leading to a prison sentence. The prohibition on taking photographs in the precincts is vague. It was designed to prevent the undermining of the dignity of the court, through the exploitation of images in low brow "picture papers".

Photography of certain subject matter is restricted in the United Kingdom. In particular, the Protection of Children Act 1978 restricts making or possessing pornography of children under 18, or what looks like pornography of under-18s. There is no law prohibiting photographing children in public spaces.

Taking photographs on private property is also legal. The landowner may, as a condition of granting entry to the private property, choose to place conditions or restrictions on photography, but the only consequence of failure to comply with these conditions is the photographer being required to leave. Landowners and their agents cannot inspect or delete, or require the deletion of, photographs taken this way.

=== Anti-terrorism law ===
It is an offence under the Counter-Terrorism Act 2008 to publish or communicate a photograph of a constable (not including PCSOs), a member of the armed forces, or a member of the security services, which is of a kind likely to be useful to a person committing or preparing an act of terrorism. There is a defence of acting with a reasonable excuse; however, the burden of proof is on the defence, under section 58A of the Terrorism Act 2000. A PCSO in 2009 cited Section 44 of the Terrorism Act 2000 to prevent a member of the public photographing him. Section 44 actually concerns stop and search powers. However, in January 2010 the stop-and-search powers granted under Section 44 were ruled illegal by the European Court of Human Rights.

While the Act does not prohibit photography, critics have alleged that powers granted to police under Section 44 have been misused to prevent lawful public photography. Notable instances have included the investigation of a schoolboy, a Member of Parliament and a BBC photographer. The scope of these powers has since been reduced, and guidance around them issued to discourage their use in relation to photography, following litigation in the European Court of Human Rights.

Following a prolonged campaign, including a series of demonstrations by photographers dealt with by police officers and PCSOs, the Metropolitan Police was forced to issue updated legal advice which confirms that "Members of the public and the media do not need a permit to film or photograph in public places and police have no power to stop them filming or photographing incidents or police personnel" and that "The power to stop and search someone under Section 44 of the Terrorism Act 2000 no longer exists."

It is an offence under section 58 of the Terrorism Act 2000 to take a photograph of a kind likely to be useful to a person committing or preparing an act of terrorism, or possessing such a photograph. There is an identical defence of reasonable excuse. This offence (and possibly, but not necessarily the s. 58(a) offence) covers only a photograph as described in s. 2(3)(b) of the Terrorism Act 2006. As such, it must be of a kind likely to provide practical assistance to a person committing or preparing an act of terrorism. Whether the photograph in question is such is a matter for a jury, which is not required to look at the surrounding circumstances. The photograph must contain information of such a nature as to raise a reasonable suspicion that it was intended to be used to assist in the preparation or commission of an act of terrorism. It must call for an explanation. A photograph which is innocuous on its face will not fall foul of the provision if the prosecution adduces evidence that it was intended to be used for the purpose of committing or preparing a terrorist act. The defence may prove a reasonable excuse simply by showing that the photograph is possessed for a purpose other than to assist in the commission or preparation of an act of terrorism, even if the purpose of possession is otherwise unlawful.

=== Copyright ===
Copyright can subsist in an original photograph, i.e. a recording of light or other radiation on any medium on which an image is produced or from which an image by any means be produced, and which is not part of a film. Whilst photographs are classified as artistic works, the subsistence of copyright does not depend on artistic merit. The owner of the copyright in the photograph is the photographer – the person who creates it, by default. However, where a photograph is taken by an employee in the course of employment, the first owner of the copyright is the employer, unless there is an agreement to the contrary.

Copyright which subsists in a photograph protects not merely the photographer from direct copying of his/her work, but also from indirect copying to reproduce his/her work, where a substantial part of his/her work has been copied.

Copyright in a photograph lasts for 70 years from the end of the year in which the photographer dies. A consequence of this lengthy period of existence of the copyright is that many family photographs which have no market value, but significant emotional value, remain subject to copyright, even when the original photographer cannot be traced (a problem known as copyright orphan), has given up photography, or died. In the absence of a licence, it will be an infringement of copyright in the photographs to copy them. When someone dies the rights will have transferred to someone else, perhaps through testamentary deposition (a will) or by inheritance. If there was no will, or if the photographer has not specified where the rights in the material should go, then the normal rules of inheritance will apply (although these rules are not specific to copyright and legal advice should be sought). Scanning old family photographs, without permission, to a digital file for personal use is prima facie an infringement of copyright.

Certain photographs may not be protected by copyright. Section 171(3) of the Copyright, Designs and Patents Act 1988 gives courts jurisdiction to refrain from enforcing the copyright which subsists in works on the grounds of public interest. For example, patent diagrams are held to be in the public domain, and are thus not subject to copyright.

==== Infringement ====
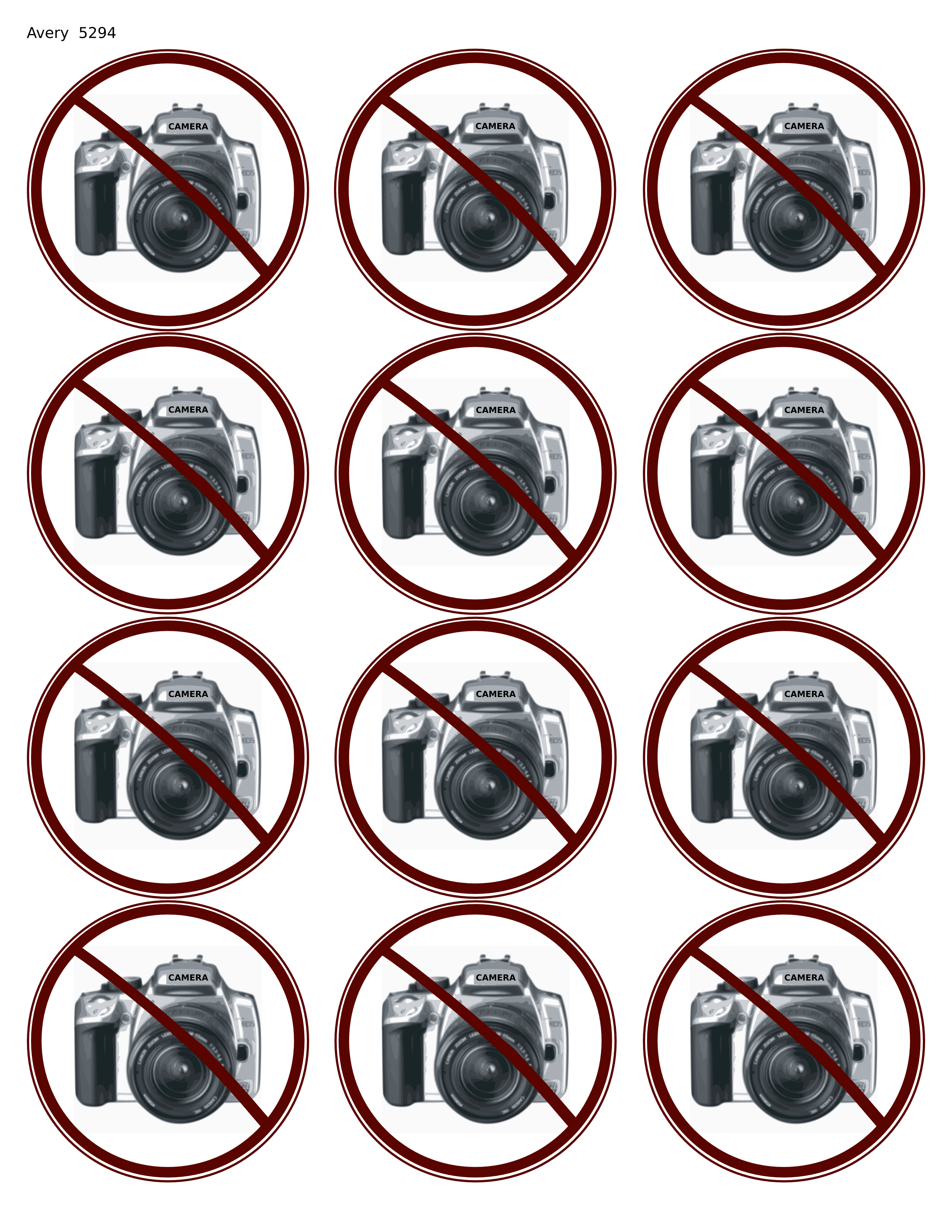
"No photographs" sticker. Designed for persons at conferences who do not want any digital likeness of them taken, including video, photography, audio, etc.

Infringement of the copyright which subsists in a photograph can be performed through copying the photograph. This is because the owner of the copyright in the photograph has the exclusive right to copy the photograph. For there to be infringement of the copyright in a photograph, there must be copying of a substantial part of the photograph. A photograph can also be a mechanism of infringement of the copyright which subsists in another work. For example, a photograph which copies a substantial part of an artistic work, such as a sculpture, painting or another photograph (without permission) would infringe the copyright which subsists in those works.

However, the subject matter of a photograph is not necessarily subject to an independent copyright. For example, in the Creation Records case, a photographer, attempting to create a photograph for an album cover, set up an elaborate and artificial scene. A photographer from a newspaper covertly photographed the scene and published it in the newspaper. The court held that the newspaper photographer did not infringe the official photographer's copyright. Copyright did not subsist in the scene itself – it was too temporary to be a collage, and could not be categorised as any other form of artistic work.

Richard Arnold has criticized the protection of photographs in this manner on two grounds. Firstly, it is argued that photographs should not be protected as artistic works, but should instead be protected in a manner similar to that of sound recordings and films. In other words, copyright should not protect the subject matter of a photograph as a matter of course as a consequence of a photograph being taken. (Note: Illustrated in the Norowzian v Arks case. In this case, it was noted that the copyright in a film would be infringed only though photographic copying of a substantial part, as opposed to mere recreation of the film. It was, however, also held that a film could be protected by copyright both as a film and as a dramatic work, provided, of course, that it fulfilled the requirements of protection of a dramatic work, on the facts. The claimant, was eventually unsuccessful. It was held that whilst the film in question in fact had copyright subsist in it both as a film and as a dramatic work, this copyright was not infringed, because there was no copying of a substantial part.) It is argued that protection of photographs as artistic works is anomalous, in that photography is ultimately a medium of reproduction, rather than creation. As such, it is more similar to a film, or sound, recording than a painting or sculpture. Some photographers share this view. For example, Michael Reichmann described photography as an art of disclosure, as opposed to an art of inclusion. Secondly, it is argued that the protection of photographs as artistic works leads to bizarre results. Subject matter is protected irrespective of the artistic merit of a photograph. The subject matter of a photograph is protected even when it is not deserving of protection. For copyright to subsist in photographs as artistic works, the photographs must be original, since the English test for originality is based on skill, labour and judgment. That said, it is possible that the threshold of originality is very low. Essentially, by this, Arnold is arguing that whilst the subject matter of some photographs may deserve protection, it is inappropriate for the law to presume that the subject matter of all photographs is deserving of protection.

It is possible to say with a high degree of confidence that photographs of three-dimensional objects, including artistic works, will be treated by a court as themselves original artistic works, and as such, will be subject to copyright. It is likely that a photograph (including a scan – digital scanning counts as photography for the purposes of the Copyright Designs and Patents Act 1988) of a two dimensional artistic work, such as another photograph or a painting will also be subject to copyright if a significant amount of skill, labour and judgment went into its creation.

=== Public art and architecture in the United Kingdom ===
The Copyright, Designs and Patents Act 1988 provides a freedom of panorama clause at Section 62, in which photography or filming of buildings, sculptures, and works of artistic craftsmanship that are permanently situated in public spaces, as well as distributions of the resulting images or videos to the public, are not infringements to the copyright. The broad exception makes selling printed images of copyrighted buildings like The Gherkin legal without needing to worry of potential incriminations from the architects.

=== Photography and privacy ===
A right to privacy came into existence in UK law as a consequence of the incorporation of the European Convention on Human Rights into domestic law through the Human Rights Act 1998. This can result in restrictions on the publication of photography.

Whether this right is caused by horizontal effect of the Human Rights Act 1998 or is judicially created is a matter of some controversy. The right to privacy is protected by Article 8 of the convention. In the context of photography, it stands at odds to the Article 10 right of freedom of expression. As such, courts will consider the public interest in balancing the rights through the legal test of proportionality.

A very limited statutory right to privacy exists in the Copyright, Designs and Patents Act 1988. This right is held, for example, by someone who hires a photographer to photograph their wedding. The commissioner, irrespective of any copyright which he does or does not hold in the photograph, of a photograph which was commissioned for private and domestic purposes, where copyright subsists in the photograph, has the right not to have copies of the work issued to the public, the work exhibited in public or the work communicated to the public. However, this right will not be infringed if the rightholder gives permission. It will not be infringed if the photograph is incidentally included in an artistic work, film, or broadcast.

== United States ==
Local, state, and national laws govern still and motion photography. Laws vary between jurisdictions, and what is not illegal in one place may be illegal in another. Typical laws in the United States are as follows:

=== Public property ===
- It is legal to photograph or videotape anything and anyone on any public property, within reasonable community standards.

=== Private property ===
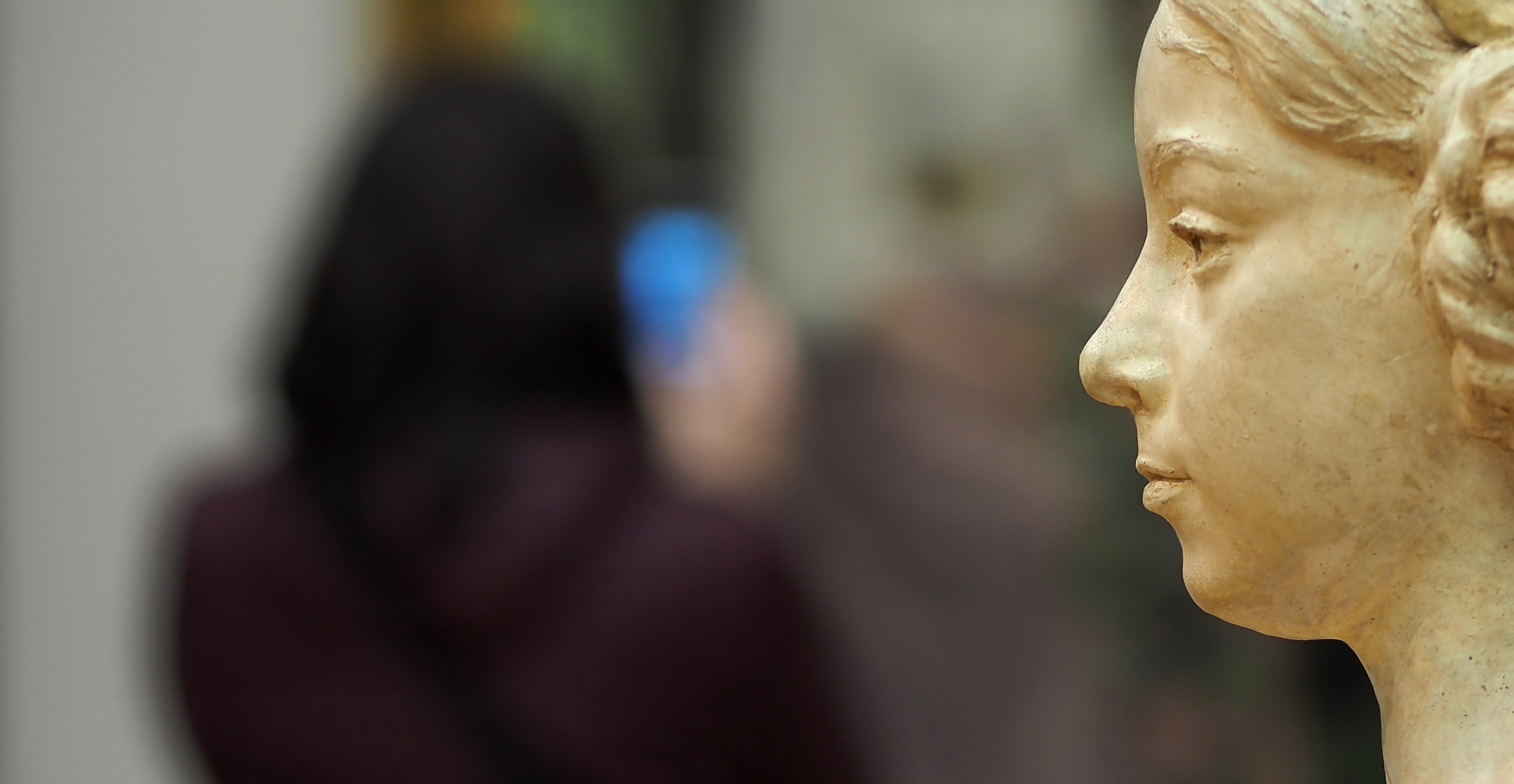
Some museums do not allow photography.

- Photography may be prohibited or restricted by a property owner on their property. However, a property owner generally cannot restrict the photographing of the property by individuals who are not within the bounds of the property.
- Photography on private property that is generally open to the public (e.g., a shopping mall) is usually permitted unless explicitly prohibited by posted signs. Even if no such signs are posted, the property owner or agent can ask a person to stop photographing, and if the person refuses to do so, the owner or agent can ask the person to leave; in some jurisdictions, a person who refuses to leave can be arrested for criminal trespass, and many jurisdictions recognize the common-law right to use reasonable force to remove a trespasser; a person who forcibly resists a lawful removal may be liable for battery, assault, or both.

=== Outer space ===
- Remote sensing of the earth from outer space is regulated by the National Oceanic and Atmospheric Administration which requires that a license be issued in advance.

=== Privacy issues ===
- Photographing private property from within the public domain is not illegal, with the exception of an area that is generally regarded as private, such as a bedroom, bathroom, or hotel room. In some states there is no definition of "private," in which case, there is a general expectation of privacy. Should the subjects not attempt to conceal their private affairs, their actions immediately become public to a photographer using normal photographic equipment.
- In the US, there are multiple laws prohibiting photographing a person's genitalia without that person's permission. This also applies to any filming of another within a public restroom or locker room. Some jurisdictions have banned the use of a telephone with camera functionality within a restroom or locker room in order to prevent this. The United States enacted the Video Voyeurism Prevention Act of 2004 to punish those who intentionally capture an individual's genitalia without consent, when the person knew the subject had an expectation of privacy. State laws have also been passed addressing this issue.

=== Commercial photography ===
- In certain locations, such as California State Parks, commercial photography requires a permit and sometimes proof of insurance. In places such as the city of Hermosa Beach in California, commercial photography on both public property and private property is subject to permit regulations and possibly also insurance requirements.
- At the Chesapeake and Ohio Canal National Historical Park, commercial photography requires a permit under certain circumstances. For photography that involves the advertising of a commercial product or service, or photography that involves sets or props or models, a permit is required. In addition, if the photography has aspects that may be disruptive to others, such as additional equipment or a significant number of personnel or the use of public areas for more than four hours, it is necessary to obtain a permit. If a photographer or related personnel need to access an area during a time when the area is normally closed, or if access to a restricted area is involved, the photography requires a permit. For commercial portrait photographers, there is a streamlined process for photography permits. In the case of National Park system units, commercial filming or audio recording requires a permit and liability insurance. Still photography that uses models or props for the purpose of commercial advertising requires a permit and proof of insurance.
- If a photograph shows private property in such a manner that a viewer of the photograph can identify the owner of the property, the ASMP (American Society of Media Photographers, Inc.) recommends that a property release should be used if the photograph is to be used for advertising or commercial purposes. According to the ASMP, a property release may be a requirement in such a situation.

=== Public art and architecture in the United States ===
The copyright law of the United States only provides a panorama exception limited to the architectural works, found at Section 120(a): "The copyright in an architectural work that has been constructed does not include the right to prevent the making, distributing, or public display of pictures, paintings, photographs, or other pictorial representations of the work, if the building in which the work is embodied is located in or ordinarily visible from a public place."

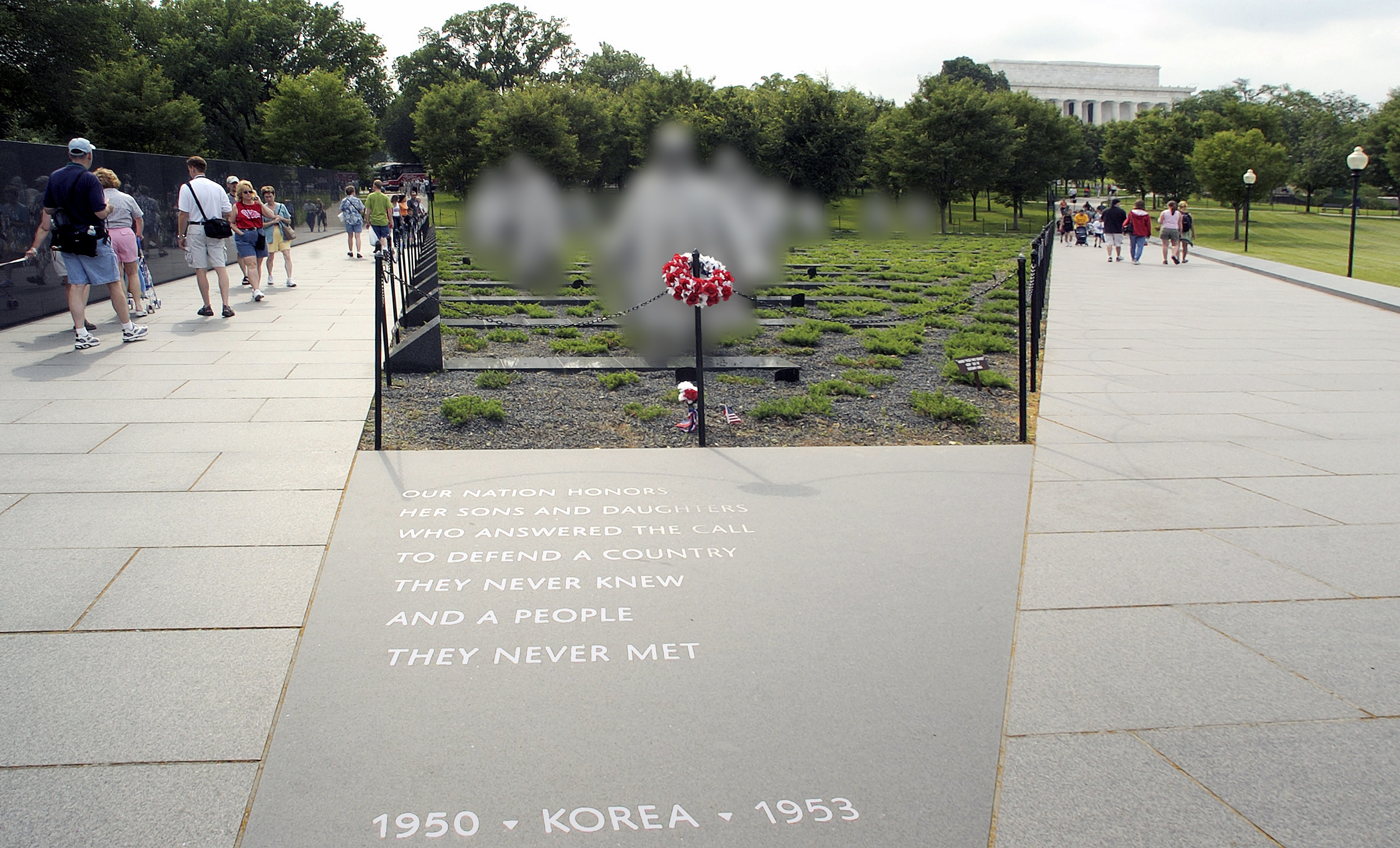
Censored image of the Korean War Veterans Memorial, subject of a lawsuit against the United States Postal Service and the photographer of an image used in the incriminated commemorative stamp

For works of art meant to be located in public spaces, Attorney Charlie Damschen of Hamilton IP Law in Iowa explained that an artist still holds copyright, though fair use principle exists that permits "transformative" uses of these works, such as in commentary, criticism, news, and parody. But if the public art was reproduced in photographs or videos and those reproductions were made with profit-making intent, the use is no longer subject to fair use defense. In the Gaylord v. United States case, concerning the United States Postal Service's use of an image of the Korean War Veterans Memorial for their 2003 commemorative stamps, the photographer of the said image – former Marine John Alli – was included in the copyright infringement lawsuit filed by the monument creator Frank Gaylord against the postal service. Ultimately, a settlement was reached between Alli and Gaylord, with the photographer promising to pay the sculptor a 10% royalty for any subsequent sales of his photograph of the monument.

Freely-licensed photographs of Clothespin, a Philadelphia sculpture authored by Claes Oldenburg, which were published on Wikimedia Commons were removed after a DMCA take-down notice was issued by the sculptor's representative against the Wikimedia Foundation, and the photographer chose not to contest the complaint.

=== Accident scenes and law enforcement ===
- Photographing or videoing accident scenes and law enforcement or emergency activities is usually legal, as long as a person does not interfere with their response or situation. Nonetheless, journalists and others have been harassed or arrested when photographing or filming police activity, leading to the formation of the organization Photography Is Not a Crime.
- Filming with the intent of doing unlawful harm against a subject may be a violation of the law in itself.

== Canada ==
Federal legislation governs the questions of copyright and criminal offences with respect to photography. Otherwise, the common law (in Quebec, the Civil Code of Quebec), generally determines when photography can take place.

- The Copyright Act provides that the duration of copyright for a photograph is the life of the author plus 70 years. Freedom of panorama is also allowed, with respect to photographs of sculptures and architectural works, and there is also protection for those who "incidentally and not deliberately include a work or other subject-matter in another work or other subject-matter."
- The Criminal Code provides for punishment of various offences, including voyeurism, child pornography, trespassing at night, and paparazzi behaviour.
- The law of defamation, trespass and privacy is governed at the provincial level.
  - The common-law provinces of British Columbia, Manitoba, Newfoundland and Labrador, Ontario and Saskatchewan have enacted privacy legislation dealing with personality rights, which supplement the law of trespass.
  - In Quebec, the Civil Code goes further by specifying that "keeping ... private life under observation by any means" constitutes an additional ground of invasion of privacy. In Aubry v Éditions Vice-Versa Inc, the Supreme Court of Canada held that, because of that, supplemented by Quebec's Charter of Human Rights and Freedoms privacy provisions, a photographer can take photographs in public places but may not publish them unless permission has been obtained from the subject, except where the subject appears in an incidental manner, or whose professional success depends on public opinion.

== France ==
=== General ===
Article 9 of the French civil code prescribes a simple clause guaranteeing privacy rights to everyone. The French penal code stipulates that unauthorized photographs of individuals in private properties are liable to a one-year term of imprisonment and a fine of €45,000. Consent is also required for publications of images of individuals in public spaces, but no consent is needed if the subject in public space is a public figure, if the ordinary individual is photographed as part of a large crowd, or if the publication of the same ordinary individual "is in the public interest". Strict rules also apply to publications of images of any individuals inside automobiles, as cars are considered private spaces. Additionally, strict rules apply to images of minors and deceased individuals whose relatives may object to public displays of their photographs. "Publication" in France includes posting of images on social media platforms.

=== Public art and architecture in France ===
Freedom to use photographs of French public landmarks is restricted to non-commercial purposes, in accordance with Article L122-5(11°) of the copyright law of France.

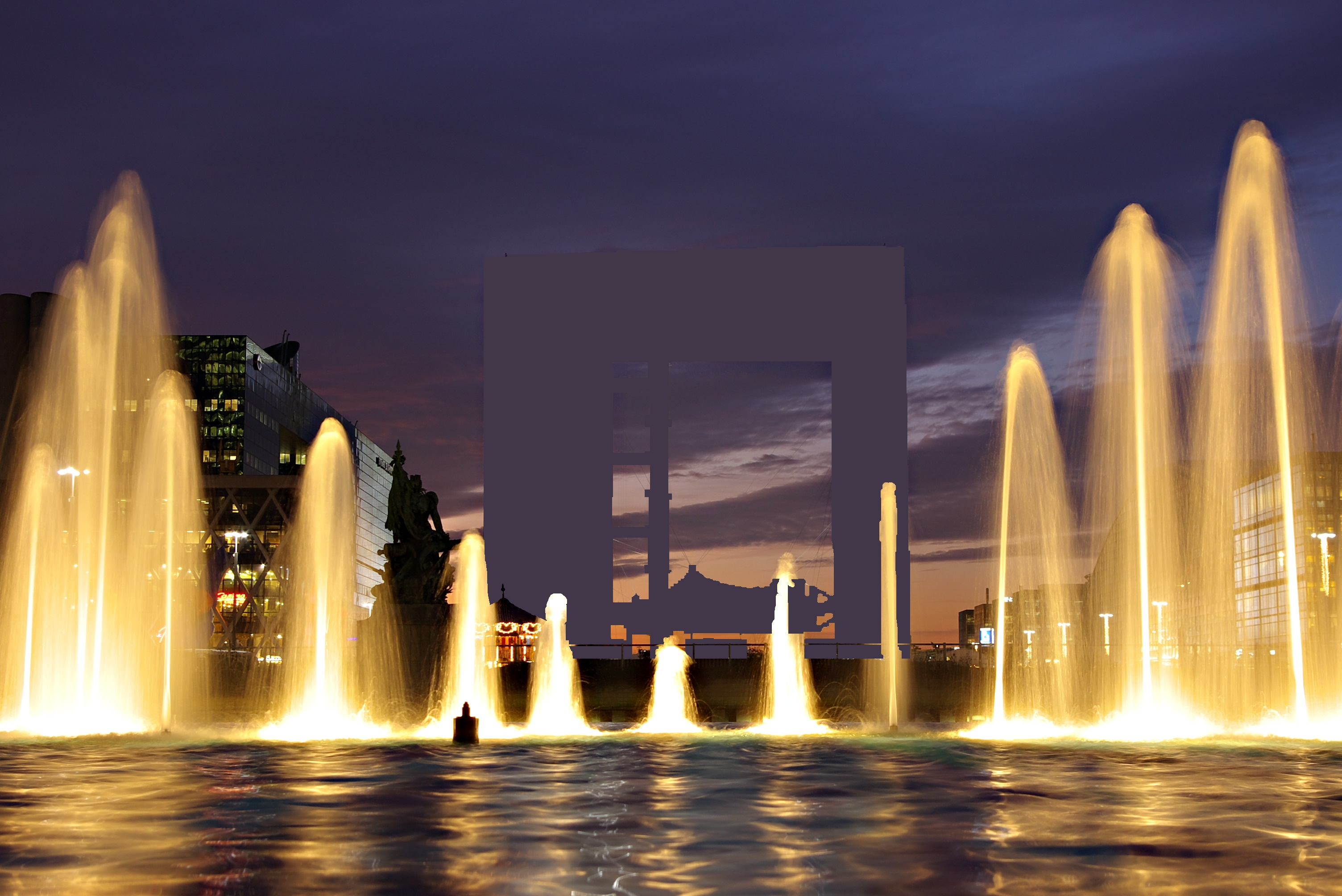
Censored image of Grande Arche, subject of a 1990 French court ruling incriminating a postcard publisher

It is a copyright infringement to photograph a public building for commercial purposes without authorization from rightsholders, whether they are the architect of the building or the entity to whom the architect has assigned their rights. Two separate rulings in 1990 by the French supreme court ruled that unauthorized postcards depicting Grande Arche and La Géode as main subjects were infringements to architectural copyrights. However, French jurisprudence traditionally recognized that photographs available for commercial use in which copyrighted landmarks are minor elements are not infringing copyright.

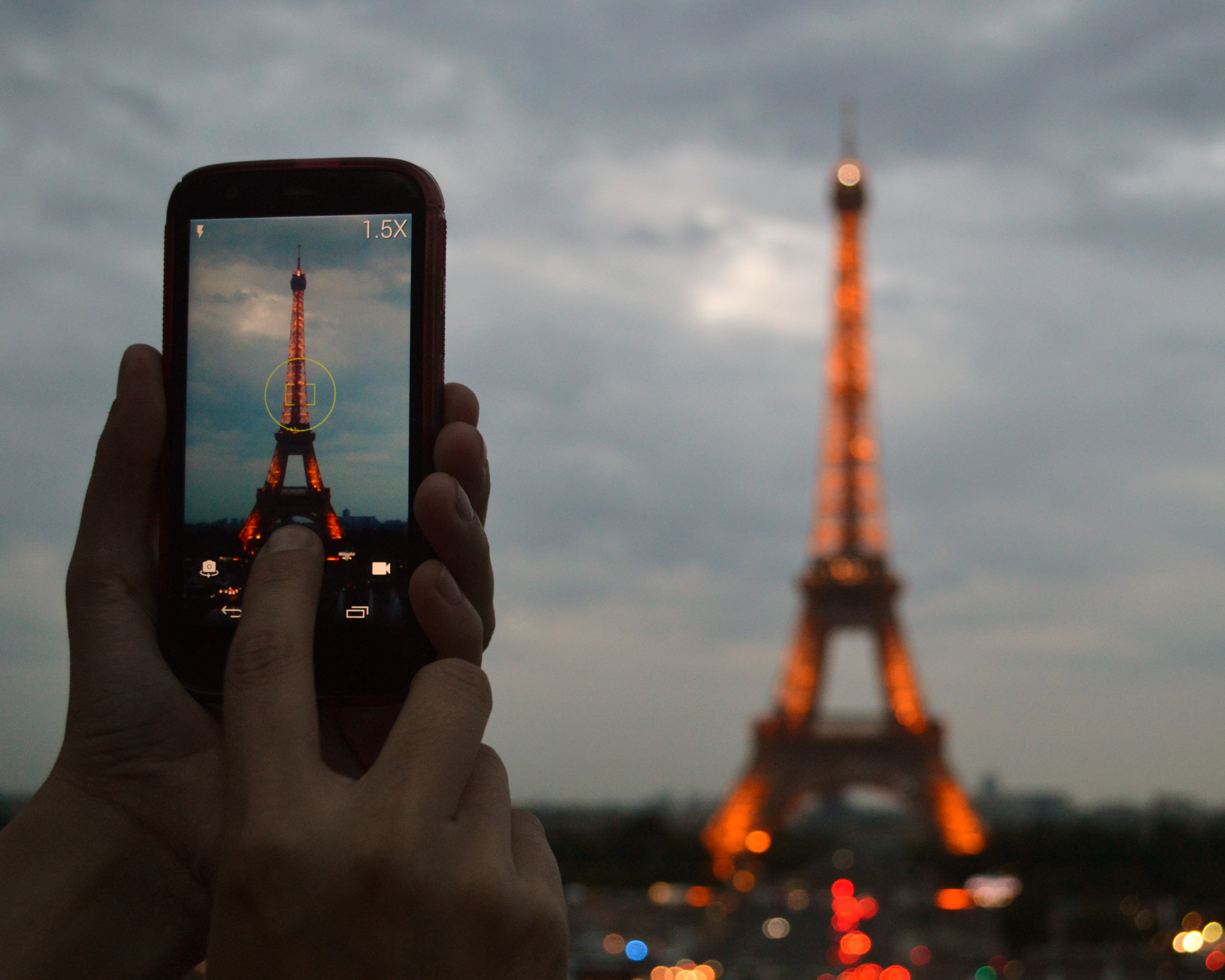
The illuminated Eiffel Tower at dusk being photographed

Commercial uses of images of an illuminated Eiffel Tower, such as in magazines, on film posters, or on packaging, may be subject to prior authorizations from Société d'Exploitation de la Tour Eiffel (SETE), the tower's operating company who claims copyright on the illuminations although its claim has not been legally challenged. A 2014 article in the Art Law Journal suggested there would be no legal problems for tourists posting casual photographs of the illuminated tower on social media. Due to the restrictive French copyright law, it is often rare to find images or videos of the lit tower at night on stock image websites, and media outlets rarely broadcast images or videos of it. In any case, the alleged copyright on the illumination will expire in 2091, 70 years after the death of the lighting engineer Pierre Bideau in 2021.

== Germany ==
=== Public art and architecture in Germany ===
German public art meant for permanent fixtures in public spaces and exteriors of German buildings can be freely photographed courtesy of Section 59 of the German copyright law. German courts have ruled that drone photographs of copyrighted pieces of the aforementioned works do not enjoy the aforementioned panorama exemption, since the airspace is "generally inaccessible to the public" and such images should not be published, distributed, or marketed to the public. The legal privilege only protects images of copyrighted pieces of artworks and architecture taken from the street level.

== Hong Kong ==
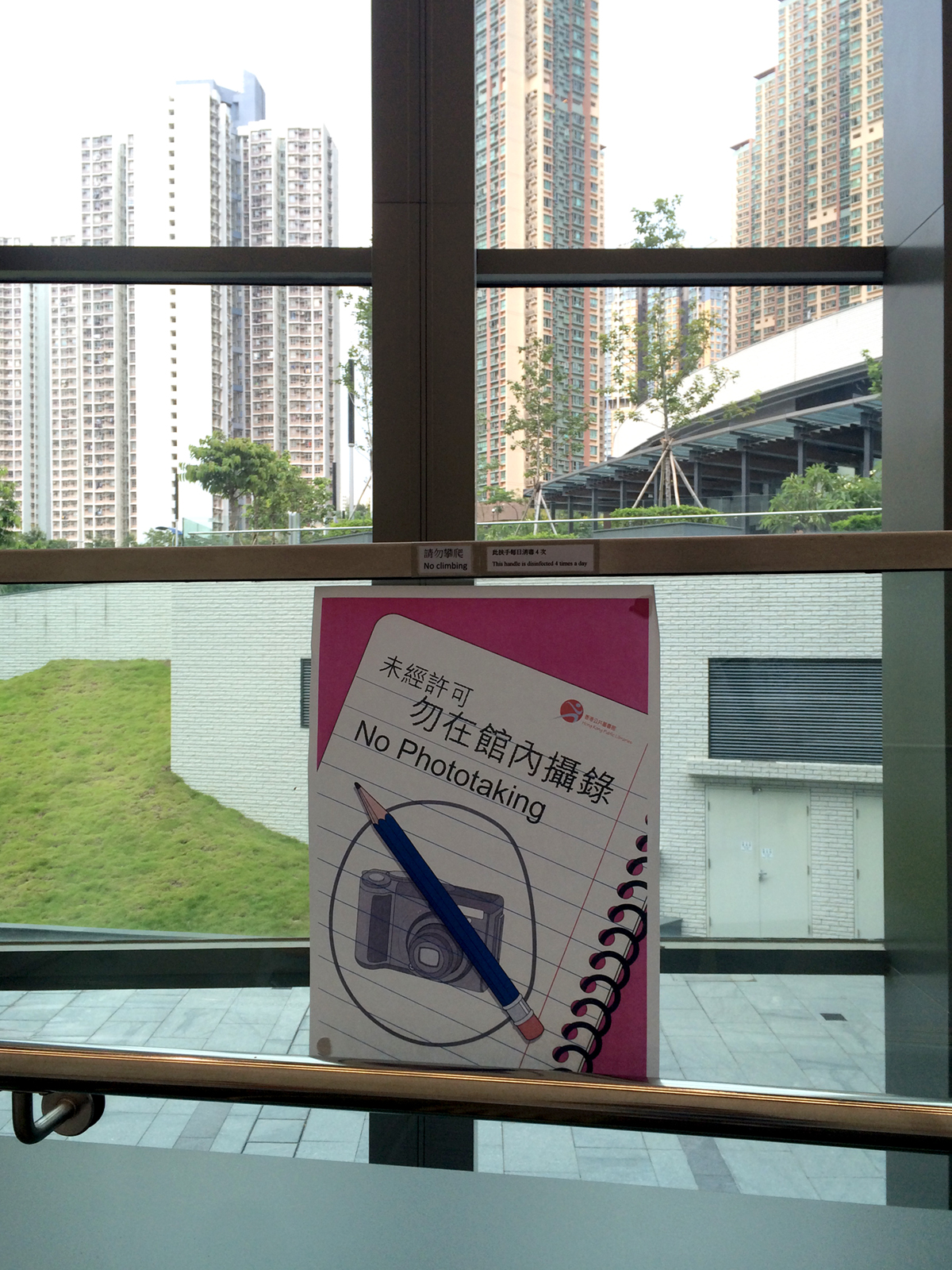
A sign declaring "No Phototaking" inside a Hong Kong public library

In some public property owned by government, such as law courts, government buildings, libraries, civic centres and some of the museums in Hong Kong, photography is not allowed without permission from the government. It is illegal to equip or take photographs and recording in a place of public entertainment, such as cinemas and indoor theaters.

In private property, photography may be prohibited or restricted by a property owner on their property.

Photography on private property that is generally open to the public (e.g., a shopping mall) is usually permitted unless explicitly prohibited by posted signs. Even if no such signs are posted, the property owner or agent can ask a person to stop photographing, and if the person refuses to do so, the owner or agent can ask the person to leave; in some jurisdictions, a person who refuses to leave can be arrested for criminal trespass, and many jurisdictions recognize the common-law right to use reasonable force to remove a trespasser; a person who forcibly resists a lawful removal may be liable for battery, assault, or both.

== Hungary ==
In Hungary, from 15 March 2014 when the long-awaited Civil Code was published, the law re-stated what had been normal practice, namely, that a person had the right to refuse being photographed. However, implied consent exists: it is not illegal to photograph a person who does not actively object.

== Iceland ==
Calling oneself a photographer, in line with most other trades in Iceland, requires the person to hold a Journeyman's or Master's Certificates in the industry. Exceptions can be made in low population areas, or for people coming from within the EEA.

Concerning use of public spaces in Iceland, the Icelandic copyright law does not permit a freedom of panorama exception. While it is allowed to publish photographs of public art or architecture under Article 16 of the law, reusers are compelled to pay remuneration to the author of the depicted work if the work becomes the main object of the photograph and the use is commercial. Newspapers and television broadcasters are exempted from the aforementioned mandatory remuneration.

== Indonesia ==
In Indonesia, photos are considered as digital documents under the Electronic Information and Transaction law and as personally identifying biometric data under the Personal Data Protection law. The Electronic Information and Transaction law limits how digital documents are commercialized and shared, and the Personal Data Proectection law limits how personally identifying biometric data is processed. Exceptions apply to public figures, and matters of public security and interest in both laws.

On a follow-up trial of the Personal Data Protection law, exceptions are further granted to journalists, academics, and artists in conducting their roles, functions and tasks.

== Macau ==
In Macau, a photographer must not take or publish any photographs of a person against his/her will without legal justification, even in a public place. Besides, everyone has a right to Personality Rights. People are not to be photographed, photographs of them displayed or reproduced without their prior consent. Criminal penalties include imprisonment. Additionally, photography of police officers in Macau is illegal.

== Malaysia ==
In Malaysia, a letter of approval is required for photography using drone.

== Mexico ==
Mexican law is similar to the law in the United States. Authorities may intimidate or prevent any holder of a camera if they come into close perimeters of Government buildings.

== Philippines ==
=== Privacy law of the Philippines ===
In a 2022 advisory opinion by the National Privacy Commission, regarding the legality of taking photographs of certain medical facilities as part of a health monitoring activity by a local division of the Department of Health, a photograph of an identifiable person was deemed "personal information" under the scope of the Data Privacy Act. The commission listed the following lawful cases of the use of this personal information as prescribed by Section 12 of the Data Privacy Act:

- The data subject has given their consent.
- The processing of personal information is necessary and is related to the fulfillment of a contract with the data subject or in order to take steps at the request of the data subject prior to entering into a contract.
- The processing is necessary for compliance with a legal obligation to which the personal information controller is subject.
- The processing is necessary to protect vitally important interests of the data subject, including life and health.
- The processing is necessary in order to respond to national emergency, to comply with the requirements of public order and safety, or to fulfill functions of public authority which necessarily includes the processing of personal data for the fulfillment of its mandate.
- The processing is necessary for the purposes of the legitimate interests pursued by the personal information controller or by a third party or parties to whom the data is disclosed, except where such interests are overridden by fundamental rights and freedoms of the data subject which require protection under the Philippine Constitution.

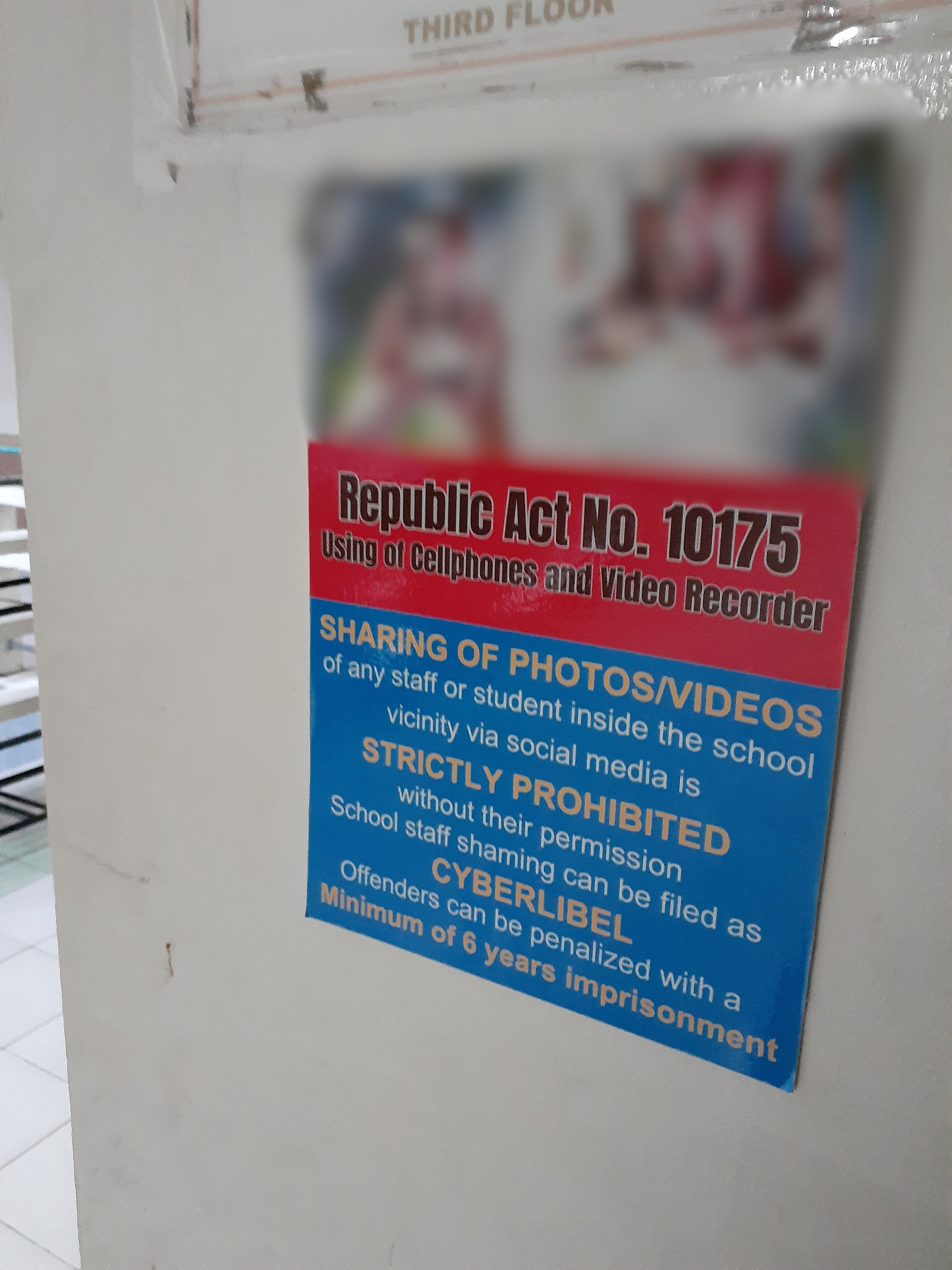
In the Philippines, sharing of photos of students and school staff without the subjects' consent may violate Republic Act No. 10175 or the Cybercrime Prevention Act of 2012.

=== Public spaces in the Philippines ===
There has been a controversy among Filipino photographers and establishment managements. On June 12, 2013, Philippine Independence Day, pro-photography group, Bawal Mag-Shoot Dito (lit. 'No Shooting Here') launched at the Freedom to Shoot Day protest at Rizal Park. The group protested for their right to take photos of historical and public places, especially in Luneta and Intramuros. The park management imposed a fee for D-SLR photographers to shoot images for commercial purposes but it was also reported that security guards also charge ₱500 to shoot photos even for non-commercial purposes, an act which the advocacy group branded as "extortion". The group also claimed that there is discrimination against Filipino photographers and claimed that the management is lenient on foreign photographers. There is no official policy on taking photographs of historical places and the group has called legislators to create a law on the matter.

The Department of Tourism, in their November 15, 2011 press release, clarified that everyone is permitted to take photographs at Rizal Park and Intramuros for personal or souvenir purposes. The department stated that prior permission from the National Parks Development Committee (NPDC, for Rizal Park) or the Intramuros Administration (for Intramuros) is needed for shoots of commercial nature, "to ensure that the well-being of the photographers are taken care of, as well as make certain that everything goes smoothly during the shoot."

The NPDC issued rules in 2018 aimed at regulating photography and videography at both Rizal and Paco Parks, after an incident wherein filmmaker Chris Cahilig and boy band 1:43 were intercepted by the personnel of Rizal Park for failing to secure permission from NPDC before doing a video session. While casual snapshots for personal or souvenir purposes through mobile phones and simple cameras are tolerated, prior permission is required for photography and videography of the parks for commercial, professional, reporting, interviewing, and special occasion purposes, as well as sessions that may cause disruption at the parks. Additionally, consent from the National Historical Commission of the Philippines (NHCP) is necessary for shoots involving both the Rizal Monument and the Philippine Flag. Cahilig reacted to the policy, calling it "anti-tourism" and "backward".

In November 2023, the Bawal Mag-Shoot Dito group held a "Tigil Pitik Photowalk" lit. 'Stop Shooing Photowalk' at the Arroceros Urban Forest Park in protest of restrictive policies across various public parks in the country prohibiting the taking of photos for personal and non-commercial purposes.

=== Public art and architecture in the Philippines ===
The Intellectual Property Code of the Philippines, or Republic Act 8293, does not permit a freedom of panorama exception allowing artistic works and architecture situated in public spaces in the Philippines to be photographed and used for commercial purposes without needing the permission from the copyright holders of the said works of art; for example, shooting a video of a public space with a building authored by an architect who is a National Artist, and selling the said video to Netflix.

== South Africa ==
In South Africa photographing people in public is legal. Reproducing and selling photographs of people is legal for editorial and limited fair use commercial purposes. There exists no case law to define what the limits on commercial use are. Civil law requires the consent of any identifiable persons for advertorial and promotional purposes. Property, including animals, do not enjoy any special consideration.

During the media coverage of the Nkandla controversy it emerged that there exists a law, the National Key Points Act, 1980, prohibiting the photographing of any "national key points." National key points are buildings or structures that serve a strategic or military purpose. Though it wasn't revealed what these are as part of state secrecy it was claimed that the presidential residence is one of them and should thus not be shown in media. Subsequent court action resulted in it being ruled that a list of all key points be made public. Although not currently or previously enforced the law is still in effect even after calls for it to be repealed as a relic of apartheid-era secrecy legislation.

== South Korea ==
In South Korea, Portrait Rights (초상권) states that a photo of a person's face or other physical features that can identify them cannot be used for commercial purposes such as in advertisement.

Article 14 of the "Act on Special Cases Concerning the Punishment, etc. of Sexual Crimes" (성폭력범죄의 처벌 등에 관한 특례법) in South Korea defines a person subject to punishment for filming as "a person who takes photos of another person's body, which may cause any sexual stimulus or shame against the latter's will, by using a camera or similar mechanism, or who distributes, sells, leases, provides, or openly exhibits or screens the resulting photographs/videos". Distribution or possession are punishable. Article 14 has been criticized for its ambiguity, noting that the definition of who is guilty or not, in cases such as clothed photos taken from behind, becomes a completely subjective matter.

In the United States and United Kingdom, the scope of taking creepshots subject to punishment is primarily limited to filming of nude body, genitals, underwear, or body parts normally covered by clothing and not visible in a private space (or where there is a reasonable expectation of privacy), or upskirting in a public place.

In South Korea, however, taking creepshots of women in public places wearing revealing clothing or outfits that expose their body lines (e.g., swimsuit, leggings, skinny jeans, hot pants, etc.), is punishable by law as a sexual crime, even it's not upskirting. Even secretly taking pictures of legs or thighs (not upskirting) can be subject to punishment as a sexual crime.

Filming a clothed person from a long distance can also be punished as a sexual crime in South Korea. When a person is photographed from a long distance, the court judges whether there is "sexual intent", or whether the act cause "sexual shame". The law has been criticised for lacking clear standards for legal interpretation. In 2021, in a case involving the secret filming of a woman in leggings, the Supreme Court of Korea broadly interpreted the scope of "sexual shame" and ruled guilt, stating that even mere unpleasantness can be construed as sexual shame. The South Korean women's community expressed its welcoming stance on this decision.

There are opinions such as, "it's unfair to be punished when something specific is captured while filming other things in public places", and "It would be better to define specific scope (of punishment for voyeurism) like in the U.S." However, there are also arguments stating, "it can sufficiently be a crime if the victim feels offended", and "even if someone wears short clothing in public, they did not agree to be filmed by others."

== Spain ==
Taking pictures or recording police officers is legal, however it is a serious offence to share or publish those images if:

1. they could put at risk the police officers and their families from harassment
2. they could put at risk a planned police operation
3. taken at a strategic or classified facilities.

If none of the 3 mentioned cases apply, it is only legal to share those images if the faces, voices and any identity signs are removed.

== Sudan and South Sudan ==
Travelers who wish to take photographs must obtain a photography permit from the Ministry of Interior, Department of Aliens (Sudan) or Ministry of Information (South Sudan).

== See also ==
- Freedom of panorama
- Google Street View privacy concerns
- Ballot selfie
- Model release
- Public domain
