= Glik v. Cunniffe =

2011 court case regarding private citizen's action

- Court: United States Court of Appeals for the First Circuit
- Full case name: Simon Glik v. John Cunniffe, et al
- Argued: June 8 2011
- Decided: August 26 2011
- Docket nos.: 10-1764
- Citation: 655 F.3d 78

Case history
- Procedural history: Interlocutory appeal of oral denial of motion for summary judgment by defendants

Holding
- Held that a citizen has the right to film public officials in a public place; the public's right of access to information is coextensive with that of the press.

Court membership
- Judges sitting: Juan R. Torruella, Kermit Lipez, and Jeffrey R. Howard

Case opinions
- Majority: Lipez, joined by Torruella and Howard

Laws applied
- U.S. Const. amend. I, U.S. Const. amend. IV, and Mass. Gen. Laws ch. 272, § 99

Glik v. Cunniffe, 655 F.3d 78 (1st Cir. 2011) is a case in which the United States Court of Appeals for the First Circuit held that a private citizen has the right to record video and audio of police carrying out their duties in a public place, and that the arrest of the citizen for a wiretapping violation violated his First and Fourth Amendment rights. The case arose when Simon Glik filmed Boston, Massachusetts, police officers from the bicycle unit making an arrest in a public park. When the officers observed that Glik was recording the arrest, they arrested him and Glik was subsequently charged with wiretapping, disturbing the peace, and aiding in the escape of a prisoner. Glik then sued the City of Boston and the arresting officers, claiming that they violated his constitutional rights.

In a unanimous decision, the United States Court of Appeals for the First Circuit held that the officers violated Glik's constitutional rights and that the officers were not entitled to qualified immunity. The Court ruled that the right to film the police carrying out their duties in public was "clearly established", and that Glik's actions did not violate state law. However, the court also noted that the right to film public officials was subject to reasonable limitations with respect to the time, place and manner in which the recording was conducted. After losing the appeal, Boston reached a settlement with Glik in which they agreed to pay him $170,000 in damages and attorney's fees. This was the first case in which a United States Circuit Court of Appeals explicitly ruled that private citizens have a right to film police officers in public spaces. The case drew media attention across the United States, and was also cited favorably by other United States Circuit Courts of Appeals that reached similar conclusions in other cases.

== Background ==
On October 1, 2007 while walking in Boston Common, (Note: Boston Common is the oldest public park in the United States, and is known as a public forum for free speech.) Simon Glik saw an arrest by Boston Bicycle Unit police officers John Cunniffe, Peter Savalis, and Jerome Hall-Brewster. Glik began recording the arrest after he heard a bystander say "[y]ou are hurting him, stop". Because Glik was concerned that the officers were using excessive force, he filmed the encounter with his cell phone. Although Glik was 10 feet away and was not interfering with the arrest, one of the officers turned to him after placing handcuffs on the suspect and said "I think you have taken enough pictures". Glik replied that he was recording the incident; he said, "I am recording this. I saw you punch him". When the officer determined that this included audio, he placed Glik under arrest for violating the Massachusetts wiretapping law.

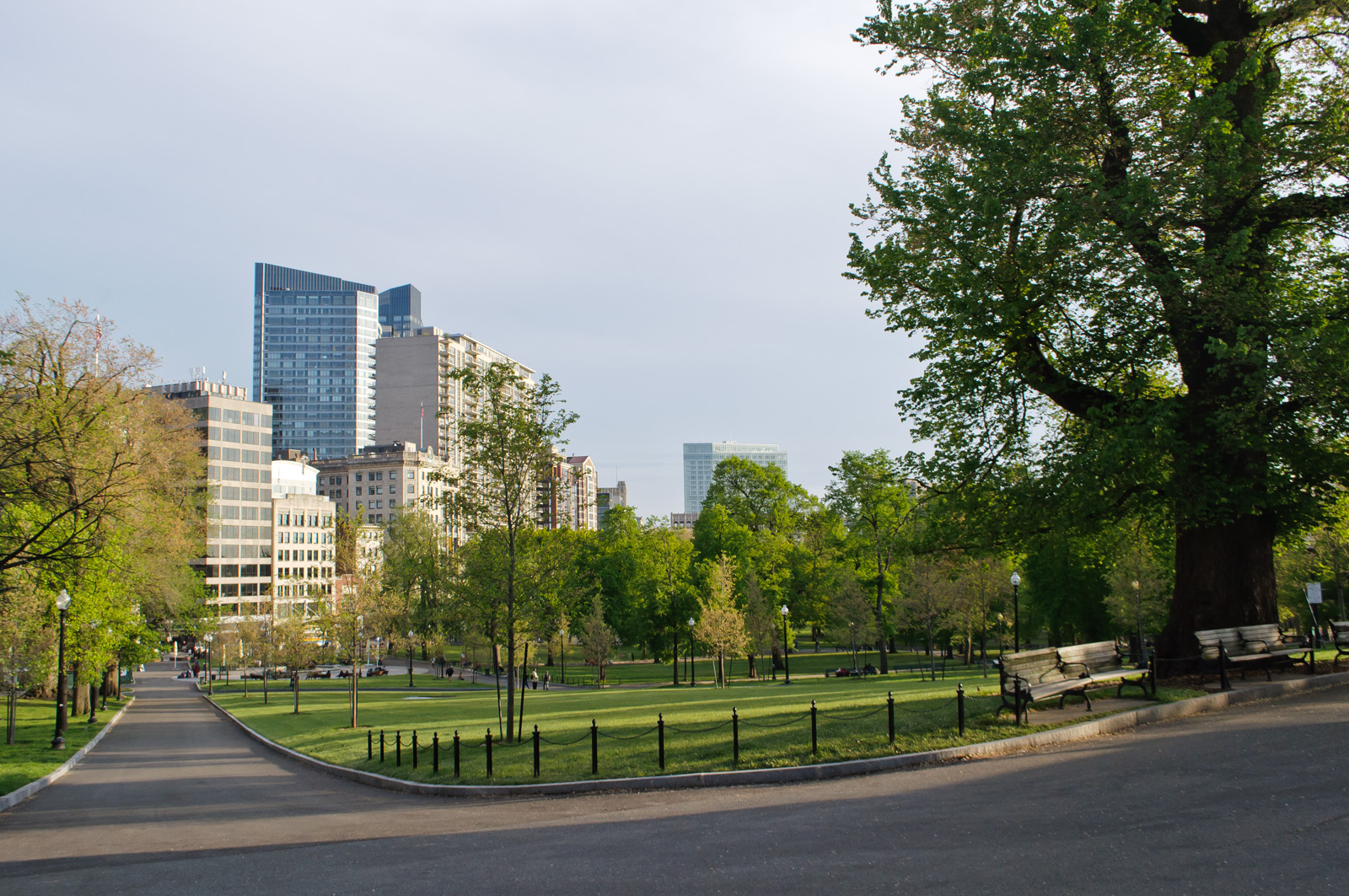
The Boston Common, the site of Glik's arrest.

Glik was charged with wiretapping, disturbing the peace, and aiding in the escape of a prisoner. (Note: The "escaped" prisoner was taken to the police station at the same time as Glik, having never broken free from the arresting officers.) He was taken to the South Boston police station and his cell phone and a computer flash drive were held as evidence. The Commonwealth dropped the charge of aiding in escape prior to trial. The Boston Municipal Court dismissed the other two counts in February 2008, noting that there was no probable cause for the wiretapping arrest and that the officers were unhappy about being recorded.

Glik then filed a complaint with the Internal Affairs section of the Boston Police Department. After the department refused to investigate that legitimate complaint, Glik, represented by Sarah Wunsch of the American Civil Liberties Union and attorneys David Milton and Howard Friedman, filed a civil rights lawsuit against the officers and the city, alleging violations of his First and Fourth Amendment rights. The officers moved for dismissal, based in part on qualified immunity. The United States District Court for the District of Massachusetts denied the motion, noting that "this First Amendment right publicly to record the activities of police officers on public business is established."

The officers then made an interlocutory appeal (Note: An interlocutory appeal is an appeal that "occurs before the trial court's final ruling on the entire case".) of the denial to the First Circuit Court of Appeals.

== Opinion of the court ==
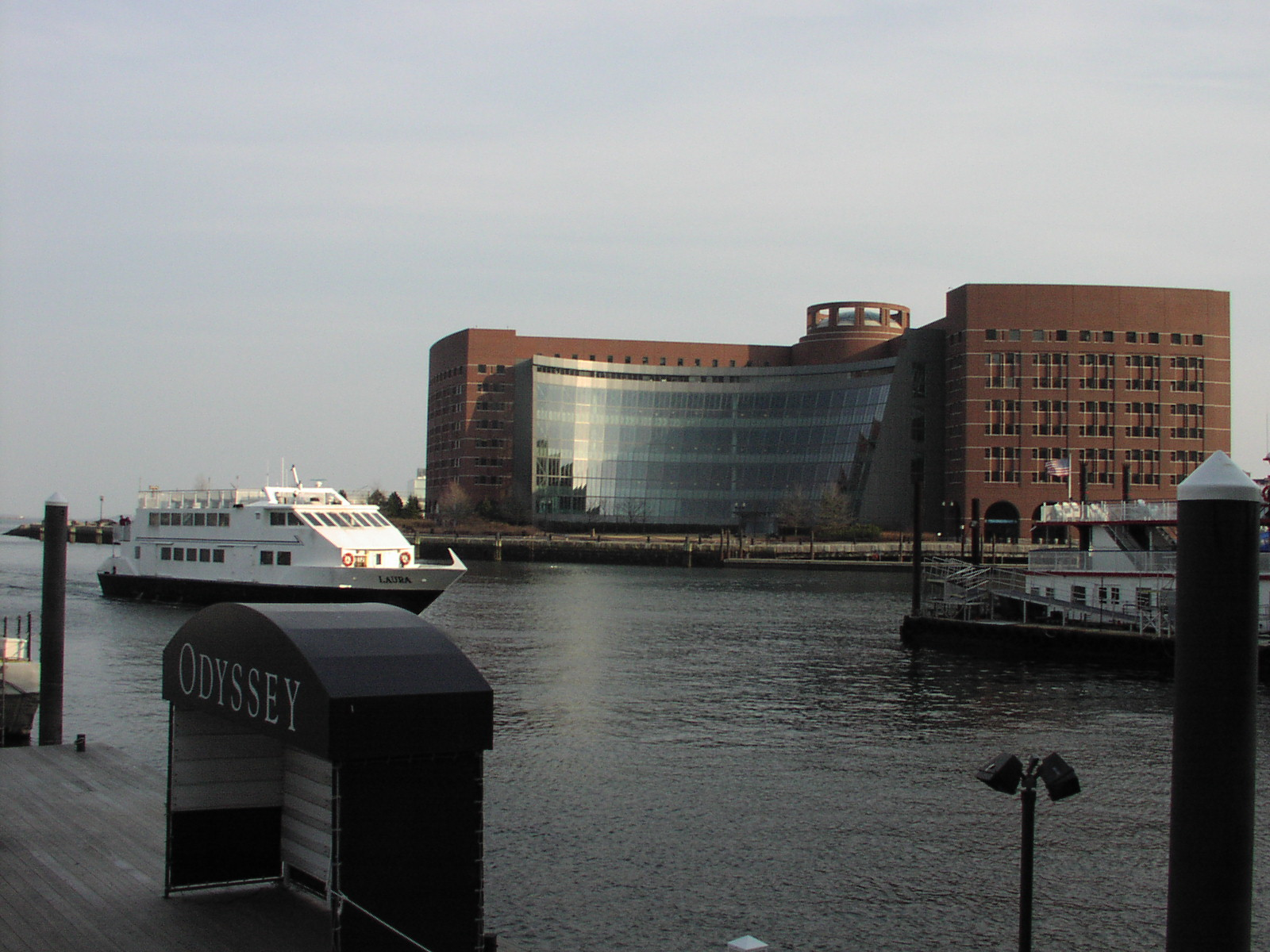
The John Joseph Moakley United States Courthouse (pictured) is the headquarters of the United States Court of Appeals for the First Circuit, where Glik's appeal was heard.

In a unanimous decision written by Judge Kermit Lipez, the First Circuit Court of Appeals held that the officers violated Glik's constitutional rights. The court noted the principle of qualified immunity balanced the need to hold public officials accountable with the need to shield such officials from harassment on account of their public duties. The court therefore applied a two-part test: first, did the facts alleged by the plaintiff show a violation of a constitutional right, and second, was the right clearly established at the time of the violation.

The court first addressed the question of whether Glik's First Amendment rights had been violated. It noted that "we have previously recognized that the videotaping of public officials is an exercise of First Amendment liberties" and held that Glik had a constitutional right to videotape a public official in a public place. The court noted that this was not limited to reporters and journalists, but a right of all citizens, subject to reasonable limitations of time, place and manner. The First Circuit concluded that in the current case, none of those limitations applied.

Second, the court looked at whether the right to videotape was clearly established at the time of the arrest. The court had "no trouble concluding that 'the state of the law at the time of the alleged violation gave the defendant[s] fair warning that [their] particular conduct was unconstitutional.'" The court noted that some constitution violations are "self-evident" and the right to film police carrying out their duties in public was clearly established a decade prior to Glik's arrest.

Next, the court determined if Glik's Fourth Amendment rights had been violated. The court noted that an arrest must be based upon probable cause. Glik argued that the officers lacked probable cause when they made the arrest, while the officers argued that the allegations in the complaint established that they had probable cause to arrest Glik for violating the wiretap statute. The court looked to the Massachusetts Supreme Judicial Court for the determination of state law. The Massachusetts court required that the recording be made secretly to be a violation, and that when a camera was in plain sight, a recording from that camera cannot be considered "secret" under state law. In Glik's case, the criminal complaint stated that he had "openly record[ed] the police officers", the recording was not made in secret, and that therefore the officers had no probable cause to arrest Glik. Since there was no probable cause, Glik's Fourth Amendment rights were violated.

Finally, the court determined that the absence of probable cause as a constitutional violation was clearly established in law. The court therefore held that the district court's denial of the officers of qualified immunity was proper, affirming the decision.

== Subsequent developments ==
Despite his victory in court, the case had negative repercussions for Glik, an attorney, who had difficulty obtaining employment as a prosecutor while criminal charges were pending against him. He is now a criminal defense lawyer. After losing the appeal, Boston settled the lawsuit for $170,000, paying Glik for damages and legal fees. Additionally, the city reversed its earlier opinion that the officers had done nothing wrong, stating that the officers had shown "unreasonable judgement" by arresting Glik. In 2012, a Boston Police Department spokesperson stated that the officers involved in the case stood to face "discipline ranging from an oral reprimand to suspension". The Boston Police Department now trains its officers not to arrest people for openly recording them in public.

== Similar cases in other courts of appeals ==
Some scholars have identified Glik as the first case in which a United States Circuit Court of Appeals explicitly held that a citizen had the same rights as a journalist to record public officials in a public place, while other scholars have identified earlier rulings by circuit courts that have upheld a right of "publicly gathering information" while filming the police. Nevertheless, scholars generally consider Glik to be the first case to "tackle the issue of police recording in the smartphone era". Following the First Circuit's ruling, the Seventh Circuit Court of Appeals granted an injunction prohibiting the State of Illinois from enforcing its wiretapping law against citizens openly recording public officials in public places. Citing Glik, the Seventh Circuit stated that "applying the statute in the circumstances alleged here is likely unconstitutional."

In addition to the First and the Seventh Circuits, both the Ninth and Eleventh Circuit Court of Appeals have held that the public has a First Amendment right to record public officials. In 2000, in Smith v. City of Cumming, the United States Court of Appeals for the Eleventh Circuit held that the First Amendment protects the right of citizens to film the police. Likewise, in 1995, in Fordyce v. City of Seattle, the United States Court of Appeals for the Ninth Circuit held that a private citizen could film police conduct at a protest because the First Amendment protects the "right to film matters of public interest". However, both the Third Circuit in Kelly v. Borough of Carlisle (2010) and the Fourth Circuit in Szymecki v. Houck (2009) have held that even if the constitution protects the right to film the police, such a right was "not clearly established for the purposes of qualified immunity in those cases’ factual contexts". Additionally, the Fifth Circuit ruled in Turner v. Driver (2017) that while the officers were entitled to qualified immunity in that case, the First Amendment protects the right to record police, subject only to reasonable time, place, and manner restrictions. Some scholars suggest these various rulings present the potential for a circuit split in cases that involve the filming of police conduct, while others have described the different rulings among circuit courts as " an artificial split—not on the merits of the First Amendment right violated, but on technical qualified immunity ground".

=== District court opinions ===
In February 2016, Judge Mark A. Kearney of the United States District Court for the Eastern District of Pennsylvania ruled in Fields v. City of Philadelphia that "observing and recording" police is not expressive conduct under the First Amendment and is therefore not protected by the constitution. Commentators have noted that this opinion "breaks with consensus among federal courts", and that the case marked "the first time a federal court has not found that recording cops while on duty and in a public setting is protected by the First Amendment". Eugene Volokh also stated that the case is inconsistent with precedent from other federal circuit courts. Following the publication of the court's opinion, the American Civil Liberties Union announced that it would appeal the case to the United States Court of Appeals for the Third Circuit. On July 7, 2017, the third circuit ruled that the First Amendment protects citizens right to use electronic devices to record on-duty police officers and that right is clearly established.

== Commentary and analysis ==
The case drew national media attention, prompting editorials from the Los Angeles Times and The New York Times, amongst others. The case has also drawn notice in the legal community, with articles in the American Bar Association Journal and the Volokh Conspiracy. In addition, the United States Department of Justice cited the Glik case extensively in a letter to the Baltimore Police Department expressing concerns over policies dealing with officer interactions with citizen photographers and videographers. Commentary from law journals also discussed the lasting impact of the case. In an article for the Case Western Reserve Law Review, Gregory T. Frohman wrote that the court's ruling "seemingly laid down a nearly unfettered right for nonthreatening third-party recorders in public places". In an article for the Northern Illinois University Law Review, Jesse Harlan Alderman wrote that "[t]hough Glik and Alvarez hold sway only within their respective jurisdictions, it seems likely that the right to record public police activity will be treated as universal". Matt Giffin, writing for the Harvard Civil Rights-Civil Liberties Law Review, observed that the case "could play a significant role in solidifying the emerging consensus that citizens have a constitutional interest in monitoring the activities of police officers". Likewise, in an article for the Cardozo Law Review, Travis S. Triano noted that the Court's ruling emphasized that "Glik’s filming was found to fall well within the bounds of constitutional protections".

However, other analysts have questioned whether the First Circuit's ruling would, in fact, have a widespread impact in the future. For example, an article in the Harvard Law Review noted that the First Circuit's ruling in Glik was evidence of the court's willingness to protect a "vital First Amendment right", but that "the proliferation of body cameras may make civilians feel as if they no longer need to record officers in the field". Writing for the Florida Law Review, Caycee Hampton criticized the First Circuit for providing "no guidance for determining what situations constitute a 'public space' in which a citizen’s right to film government officials is safeguarded by the First Amendment", and absent such guidance, "citizens who choose to record law enforcement officials risk inviting the same Fourth Amendment violation confirmed in Glik". Additionally, in an article in the St. Louis University Law Journal, Justin Welply argued that the right to film the police is not absolute, and that "an individual has a First Amendment right to openly record police conduct in a public park, but does not have an established First Amendment right to openly record officers in the discharge of their duties during a traffic stop" because filming the police during a traffic stop may interfere with their ability to work effectively.
