= Sarah Wunsch =

American lawyer

Sarah Rose Wunsch (November 18, 1947 – August 17, 2023) was an American lawyer. She focused on civil liberties and civil rights issues including those of race, gender, and free speech. She worked for the Massachusetts chapter of the American Civil Liberties Union for nearly three decades.
