= Samizdata =

British group weblog

Samizdata is a British group weblog. Founded on 2 November 2001, by Perry de Havilland and originally named ‘Libertarian Samizdata’, it dropped the label due to the reluctance of editors to subscribe to a particular label.

Edited by "anarcho-libertarians, tax rebels, Eurosceptics, and Wildean individualists," Samizdata is one of the UK's oldest blogs. The editors describe Samizdata.net as "a blog for people with a critically rational individualist perspective. We are developing the social individualist meta-context for the future. From the very serious to the extremely frivolous.

In 2005, The Guardian wrote that it was "by some measures the nation's most successful independent blog," with over 15,000 unique visitors a day, and "arguably the grandfather of British political blogs." In 2008, The Observer labeled it as one of the fifty most powerful blogs in the world.
