= Turner v. Driver =

2017 American appeals court decision

- Court: United States Court of Appeals for the Fifth Circuit
- Decided: February 16, 2017

Turner v. Driver, No. 16-10312 (5th Cir. 2017), is a 2017 decision of the United States Court of Appeals for the Fifth Circuit that affirmed the First Amendment right to record the police. One of the officers involved was criminally indicted for a similar incident around the same time.

== Background ==
Philip Turner ("The Battousai", after his YouTube channel) was standing on the sidewalk, across the street from the police station, recording. Several police officers came over, including at least one police car. Turner was questioned about what he was doing. The officers then demanded he provide identification, which he refused, citing Texas law 38.02, which does not require people to identify themselves unless arrested. According to the complaint, officers put Turner in the back seat of the cruiser, since he refused to give ID, saying, "We're gonna make you sweat," and Turner demanded to speak to a supervisor. Lieutenant Driver showed up, also requesting Turner's identification, which was also refused. After a short period of time, which was not more particularly described, Turner was released.

Turner started his YouTube page on January 21, 2014. At the time of his arrest on September 1, 2015, Turner was a part-time student and a part-time employee. As of February 26, 2023, Turner's Battousai YouTube page had over 100 million views. Turner v. Driver established the right to record police under reasonable circumstances in the Fifth Circuit.

== Facts From Turner's 9/1/2015 interaction with Fort Worth PD ==
Turner recorded much of his interaction with the police and posted it on his YouTube channel, Battousai. The beginning of the video is of Turner videotaping the Fort Worth Police Department offices located at 1100 Nashville Ave, Fort Worth, TX 76105. As Turner was recording, Officers Grinalds and Dyess parked their squad car across the street then approached Turner and asked him if he had an ID on him. Turner did not answer as the officers continued to ask about ID. At one point, Turner asked if he was being detained, and Officer Grinalds responded that Mr. Turner would be detained for investigation and that they were concerned with who was walking around with a camera. Grinald's reasoning was, "We like to know who's surrounding our complexes." After Turner continued not to identify himself, the two officers grabbed him and placed him under arrest.

The officers handcuffed Turner, and Turner alleges that the officers used excessive force, which caused an injury to his wrist. Turner asked for a supervisor to come. The rest of the interaction occurred off camera; officers placed him in the back of the squad car with the windows up. Once Lt. Driver came to the car, he asked Turner if he had any ID on him. Turner responded to Driver by saying that he had no obligation to give identification because he had not been lawfully arrested. Turner then alleges that Driver responded, "You're right," before walking away and talking to Officers Grinalds and Dyess.

Lt. Driver came back to the patrol car after some time to talk with Turner. Turner told him, "You guys need to let me go because I haven't done anything wrong." Lt. Driver walked away again from the car, allegedly talked on the phone, and again spoke with officers before releasing Turner. When the officers released Turner out of the back seat, Turner alleges that he was lectured before the officers allowed him to leave. That is when the officers returned his camera. Turner, after resuming the video, shows his wrist and explains how tight the handcuffs were on him.

== District Court case ==
The District Court ruled that "an official is entitled to qualified immunity unless pre-existing law makes apparent the unlawfulness of the official's conduct." When determining whether the officers had qualified immunity, the court looked at (1) whether a clearly established statute or constitutional right existed at the time of the incident and (2) whether a reasonable official understood he violated the person's right.

In general, the court explained that the qualified immunity standard allows for mistaken judgment, but protects against officials acting under the color of law who are "plainly incompetent" or "knowingly violate the law." The court held that no case law, either in the Supreme Court or the Fifth Circuit, prohibits police officers "from making a reasonable inquiry and taking a reasonable step to identify an unknown person who is seen videotaping their place of work and the place where they come and go in their private vehicles." Their rationale was that public officials like police officers are often in danger and should take steps to ensure their safety.

The court therefore ordered that Turner's claims against Driver, Grinalds, and Dyess be dismissed, leaving only the City of Fort Worth as the defendant.

== First Amendment analysis ==
The issue was whether the public has a First Amendment right to videotape the actions of police officers. The court first looked at whether the right to video record police activity was clearly established in September 2015. The Court of Appeals disagreed with the district court on there being a circuit split regarding a First Amendment right to record the police in public. The Court of Appeals noted, that in the First, Seventh, and Eleventh Circuits, a clearly established right exists to record the police. However, no circuit has actually decided that the First Amendment does not protect against recording the police. The court also noted that the Third, Fourth, and Tenth Circuits held the right to film police activities was not "clearly established." However, the Fifth Circuit pointed out that those jurisdictions did not reach a decision on the issue of whether a First Amendment right to record the police exists going forward.

The court agreed with the district court that no existing precedent placed this First Amendment constitutional question "beyond debate."

The court then moved on to whether the right to record is clearly established henceforth. The court decided that the right should be clearly established because filming the police promotes First Amendment principles. However, the court noted that recording the police "may be subject to reasonable time, place, and manner restrictions." They did not establish a reasonable standard regarding when it is not appropriate to record the police. The court noted that the restriction must be narrowly tailored to fit a significant governmental need, but the restriction need not be the least restrictive.

== Qualified immunity analysis ==
In general, qualified immunity protects against all but the (1) plainly incompetent or (2) those who knowingly break the law. To meet the burden, the court said "the plaintiff must show (1) that the official violated a statutory or constitutional right and (2) that the right was clearly established at the time of the challenged conduct."

The court upheld the district court's decision to give Officers Grinalds, Dyess, and Driver qualified immunity for Turner's claims under the First Amendment and the Fourth Amendment for unlawful detention. They also affirmed qualified immunity as to Driver's Fourth Amendment claim for unlawful arrest. The court, however, reversed qualified immunity for unlawful arrest with regard to Grinalds and Dyess.

First, for a detention to be unlawful, it has to be objectively unreasonable in light of the existing law. The court found that Officers Grinalds and Dyees had a reasonable suspicion to approach Turner based on their knowledge of recent violence against police officers. The court believed it was reasonable for the officers to believe Turner's actions in filming the police station were suspicious enough to question and detain him briefly.

In regards to the arrest, the court said that they limited their holding to the fact that Officers Grinalds and Dyees "could not prolong an investigative detention without an investigatory purpose." The court decided that Turner had made a valid Fourth Amendment claim for the purposes of defeating the two officers' summary judgment. However, the court acknowledged that Grinalds and Dyees on remand, will have an opportunity to explain their actions, but at the stage of summary judgment, qualified immunity was not proper for them.

However, for Driver, the court then looked at whether he violated a separate constitutional right since he was not there during the arrest. The court found that Driver did not unreasonably prolong the arrest based on the facts of Turner's complaint. They found that the complaint showed Driver "diligently pursued a means of investigation that was likely to confirm or dispel the officers' suspicions quickly." Due to those facts, Driver was entitled to qualified immunity on the arrest claims, as well.

== Decision ==
The court found:

We conclude that First Amendment principles, controlling authority, and persuasive precedent demonstrate that a First Amendment right to record the police does exist, subject only to reasonable time, place, and manner restrictions.

Overall, the Fifth Circuit said that when Turner was arrested, no clearly established right existed to record police officers in public, so the doctrine of qualified immunity should be used. However, in the future, the court will recognize the right to record as clearly established. The court also reversed qualified immunity for Grinalds and Dyess regarding only Turner's Fourth Amendment claim for unlawful arrest.

== Turner dissent ==
Chief Judge Edith Brown Clement dissented from the majority's opinion that established going forward the First Amendment right to film the police in the Fifth Circuit. Chief Judge Brown felt that deciding this issue in this case was unnecessary because the first issue is whether the trial court properly guaranteed the officers qualified immunity.

Judge Clement also believed, though, that the majority had inappropriately decided on what is "clear established law" based on "a high level of generality." She believed that other precedents had narrowly decided that the First Amendment gave citizens the right to record the police. She does not believe that right extends to recording a police station, which Turner did in this case.

== Aftermath of the decision ==
Some question whether Turner v. Driver now establishes a right to record the police. Other Fifth Circuit decisions followed the First Amendment analysis of Turner v. Driver.

== Subsequent decisions ==
Going forward, to win a First Amendment retaliation claim, the plaintiff must allege that:

(1) he was engaged in constitutionally protected activity, (2) the officers' action caused him to suffer an injury that would chill a person of ordinary firmness from continuing to engage in that activity, and (3) the officers' adverse actions were substantially motivated against Plaintiff's exercise of constitutionally protected conduct.

This standard is found in Alexander v. City of Round Rock, which provided guidance going forward about when an officer violates a citizen's First Amendment right to record.

In Buehler v. Dear, cross-appellant Antonio Buehler appealed after the Turner v. Driver decision that made it legal to film the police in the Fifth Circuit so long as it "hinder[s] the police." Even though Buehler's appeal was decided on March 3, 2022, the actual incident occurred on August 2, 2015, a month before Turner's arrest. Therefore, the court held that regarding the First Amendment issue, no clearly established right existed (except in the Constitution of the United States) at the time Buehler recorded the police.

Another case in the Fifth Circuit that followed Turner's decision was Cobarobio v. Midland Cty where the plaintiff could not establish that at the time of his arrest in 2012, he had a First Amendment right to record the police. Because the First Amendment right to record the police was not established at the time, the officers had qualified immunity for their arrest.

A Texas Western District Court in Flores v. Rivas, following Turner, found that the plaintiff adequately alleges a First Amendment retaliation claim against the defendant officer. In making that determination, they used the test found in Alexander v. City of Round Rock.

Also, a Third Circuit case cited Turner v. Driver as one of the cases they were joining and held that "the First Amendment protects the act of photographing, filming, or otherwise recording police officers conducting their official duties in public." Before Fields, the Third Circuit had previously held in 2010 that there was no clearly established right for citizens to videotape police officers during a traffic stop.
