= Private policing in the United States =

A private police force, or private police department, in the United States is a law enforcement agency that is:

- owned, operated, or otherwise controlled by a non-government entity such as a private corporation, or
- a law enforcement agency whose primary function is to provide contract based security services to private entities in a manner similar to private security companies.

== Examples of private police entities ==
- Alaska Railroad Police Department
- Burlington Northern and Santa Fe Railway Police Department (BNSFPD)
- BWXT Police Department
- Canadian National Police Service (in the United States)
- Canadian Pacific Kansas City Police Service (CPKC Police Service)
- Catholic University of America Department of Public Safety
- CSX Police
- Diocese of Greensburg Police
- Georgetown University Police Department
- Harvard University Police Department
- Norfolk Southern Railway Police
- Texas and Southwestern Cattle Raisers Association Special Rangers
- University of Chicago Police Department (UCPD)
- University of Southern California's Department of Public Safety
- Union Pacific Police Department
- Washington National Cathedral Police
- Wintergreen Police Department (Belongs to Wintergreen Resort)
- Yale University Police Department

=== Defunct or Historical Agencies ===
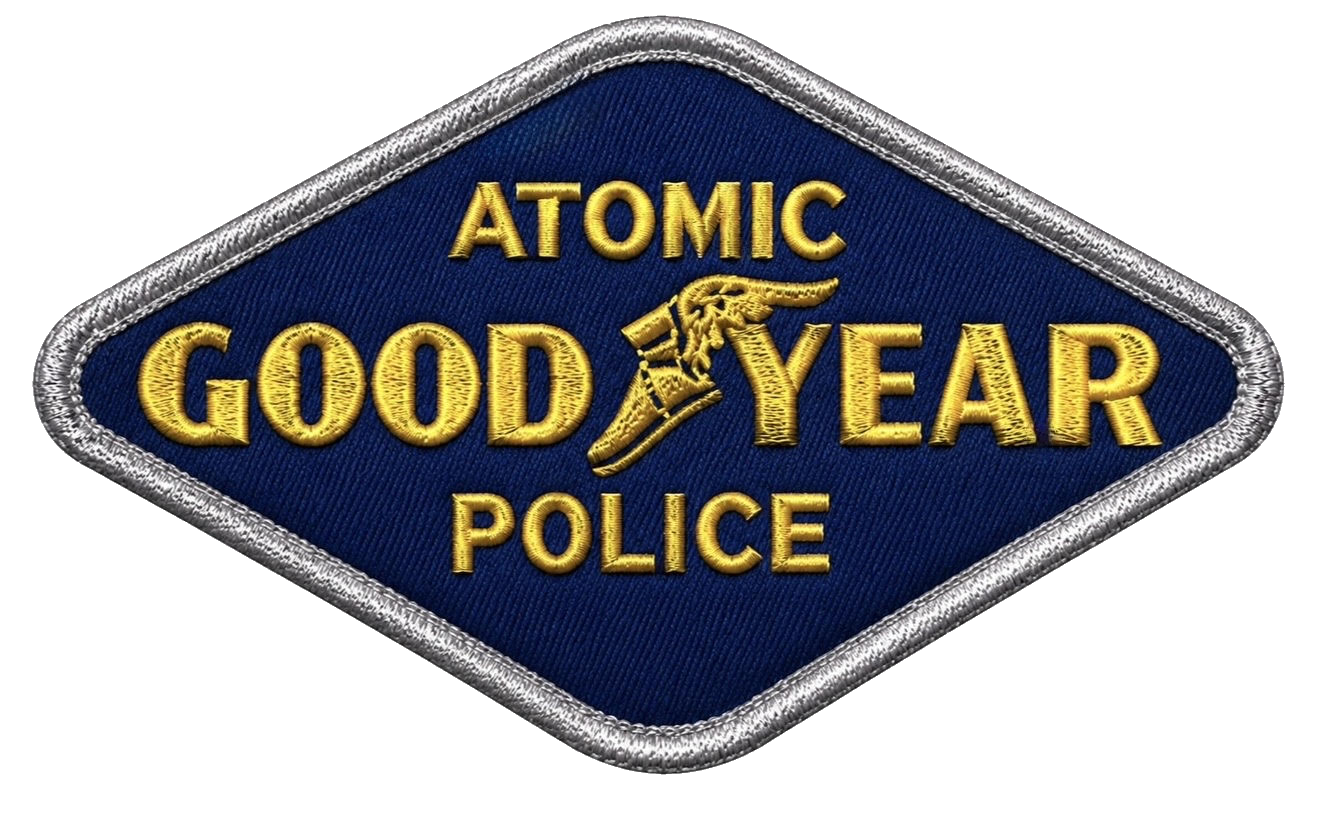
Illustration of the shoulder patch of the now-defunct Goodyear Atomic Corporation Police

- ASPCA Humane Law Enforcement Division (Defunct)
- Pinkerton National Detective Agency (Historical)
- Coal and Iron Police (Defunct)
- Goodyear Tire & Rubber Company Police Department (Defunct; converted to unsworn private security)
  - Goodyear Atomic Corporation Police (Defunct)
- HeatherRidge Police Department, Gurnee, Illinois (Defunct; converted to unsworn private security)
- San Francisco Patrol Special Police (Dissolved 2024)

=== Federal privately-staffed agencies ===
These agencies are operated by the federal government but are partly- or fully-staffed by employees of private companies on a contract basis. Officers of these agencies are privately employed but federally commissioned as law enforcement officers with varying degrees of authority.

- Federal Air Marshal Service Federal Flight Deck Officer Program
- U.S. Marshals Service Court Security Officer Program
- U.S. Department of Energy Federal Protective Forces
  - Strategic Petroleum Reserve Protective Forces
- National Aeronautics and Space Administration Office of Protective Services
- Smithsonian Institution Office of Protection Services

== Legality of Private Policing ==
Unlike the authority and licensure of a security guard, law enforcement officers employed in private police departments are certified under the same legal requirements as those set forth for regular law enforcement officers (standards vary by location/state).

The ability to create a police agency is not freely available to any private organization or person. Whether a private police department can exist, or which institutions can create them, varies widely throughout different jurisdictions in the United States. As discussed above, the specific authorities and capabilities officers employed by these agencies are provided vary by location; though they are required to receive the same licensure and training of a typical police officer.

=== Legality by State ===
==== Arizona ====
In Arizona, privately owned colleges that offer bachelor's degrees, and have at least one dormitory, may employ a security police force. These officers have full police powers on the property of the university and must meet all certification and training requirements as established by the state. The law also indemnifies the state of any liability associated with 'acting or failing to act', and instead, places the financial responsibility on the respective college or university.

==== Massachusetts ====
In the City of Boston, Massachusetts, many private entities and businesses formerly contracted companies that employed "special police officers" (SPOs) whom were licensed via the City of Boston under the Rules and Procedures of the Boston Police Department (BPD), specifically Rule 400 and Rule 400A. Rule 400 was reserved for private entities (security guards, etc) and 400A was utilized for City of Boston employees requiring police powers (Boston School Police, Boston Code Police, Boston Housing Authority Police, certain Boston Fire Department personnel, etc) that were not sworn police officers via other means. "Rule 400/A" SPOs were trained through a BPD-approved academy and had full arrest powers while on or near property they were employed or contracted to police. Boston SPOs were also granted the authority to issue civil citations through BPD-issued citation books. However, as of 1 July 2021, all Rule 400/A SPOs were stripped of their police powers and the automatic right to carry a firearm on-duty, due to the passage of Massachusetts bill S.2963, the 'Police Reform Act.' The Act requires anyone exercising police powers, including Boston SPOs, to prove that they had graduated from a Municipal Police Training Commission-approved academy or the Massachusetts State Police-sponsored 'Special State Police Officer Academy;' The City of Boston is still permitted to issue special police officer licenses, but prospective officers must meet the aforementioned requirements. As of September 2021, only 6 licenses had been re-issued, all to officers of the Boston Housing Authority Police (under Rule 400A vice 400). (Note: BHAP officers are both Massachusetts SSPOs and Rule 400A SPOs, now.) As of 2026, it is unclear how many—if any—Boston SPO licenses have been so further-issued.

Private educational and medical institutions may also form their own law enforcement agencies to serve as security police, protecting their properties and personnel. The establishment of such agencies is outlined by Massachusetts General Laws, Part I, Title II, Chapter 22C, Section 63. Public educational and medical institutions may also create their own law enforcement agencies, but are covered under separate legislation, and these are not considered 'private police' agencies.

==== North Carolina ====
In North Carolina, private police are certified company police agencies governed by the North Carolina Department of Justice chapter 74E of the Company Police Act. Under Chapter 74E, company police in North Carolina can and do make arrests, and write citations for violations of the law with powers similar to those of municipal police officers within their jurisdiction". Company Police jurisdiction applies to any real property that they own, possess, or control, or have been contracted to protect by the owner or person in control, unless they are in continuous pursuit for a crime that was committed in their jurisdiction or investigating a crime that occurred in their jurisdiction. Private police in North Carolina must meet or exceed the same training and certification requirements as municipal, county, and state law enforcement officers.

==== South Carolina ====
In South Carolina, all Security Officers have the authority and power to make an arrest just as Sheriff's Deputies do (although this is unique for the USA). In (Spring Valley HOA) Columbia, South Carolina, Private Officers respond to calls for service, run traffic radar, make arrests and use blue lights. Security Officers in South Carolina are Law Enforcement under state law, case law and the Attorney General's opinions, and are authorized by the state to issue Uniform Traffic Tickets to violators and make arrests for violations of state laws. Security Officers are considered Private Law Enforcement Officers.

==== Utah ====
In Utah, if privately owned colleges or universities are certified by the commissioner of public safety, they are allowed to have a law enforcement agency with officers being granted the same law enforcement authority as any other public law enforcement agency (police department).

== Relative Merits ==
=== Advantages ===
A cited advantage of private police is that they have a contractual responsibility to protect their customers. In Warren v. District of Columbia, the court found that public police have no such responsibility. Thus, they cannot be sued if they fail to respond to calls for help.

The use of private police, however, has particular appeal because property or business owners can directly contract for public safety services, thereby providing welcome relief for municipal budgets. Private police functions can be flexible, depending upon the financial, organizational, political, and situational circumstances of the client.

Murray Rothbard noted:

Police service is not 'free'; it is paid for by the taxpayer, and the taxpayer is very often the poor person himself. He may very well be paying more in taxes for police now than he would in fees to private, and far more efficient, police companies. Furthermore, the police companies would be tapping a mass market; with the economies of such a larger-scale market, police protection would undoubtedly be much cheaper.

Patrick Tinsley noted that some consumers might benefit from free police service:

There are products for which the bother of charging money outweighs the prospects for profit; these products are thus offered free of charge to the individual user, more or less in affiliation with the sale of coadunate goods. Examples of this phenomenon abound: book matches are given away with and without the sale of tobacco products; bathrooms, whether in restaurants or department stores or gas stations, are often open to customers and the general public alike. Police protection could operate likewise.

=== Disadvantages ===
Some argue that a "dual system" of policing could be detrimental — one for the wealthy and one for the poor — and others see the provision of private security as the primary protective resource in contemporary America. Other issues that arise in private policing include private property rights, electronic eavesdropping, and private police access to public records. Abuse of authority, false arrest, improper search, improper interrogations, and operating without a license have also been cited as potential dangers.

== Distinguishment from Similar Services ==
=== Private Security ===
A private police department is not the same as a security company that employs security guards, nor is it the same as a police officer working as a security guard for the purpose of supplemental employment.

Security companies employ security guards and are contracted to provide security for organizations, businesses, events, etc.. The specific training requirements, legal authority, and responsibilities of a security guard vary by legal jurisdiction and employer, but their authority and employment qualifications are different from that of a police officer. Private security firms patrol industrial facilities, commercial establishments, office buildings, transportation facilities, recreational complexes, shopping districts, residential neighborhoods, military complexes, power plants, and prisons.

A law enforcement officer engaging in off-duty or supplementary employment as a form of private security is not a private police department. Individual police agency policies and procedures vary widely by jurisdiction with regards to: whether or not off-duty security employment is permitted, whether agency equipment (uniforms, vehicles, radios, etc.) may be utilized, and how the officer may exercise their authority when working off-duty. Some agencies require approval to perform off-duty security work. Certain jurisdictions also maintain established programs that allow private entities to coordinate the hiring of off-duty law enforcement directly through an agency-administered program. There are documented instances where peace officers have engaged in moonlighting as private security without official approval from their primary employer. Licensed law enforcement officers may be exempt from requiring additional security licensure to be a security guard depending on their local or state laws.

=== Non-Typical Public Agencies ===
An agency is not inherently "private" only because it belongs to a university, railway system, etc., rather, it is private because it belongs to a non-public entity.

An agency that belongs to a public entity such as a public university system, transportation authority, transit agency, public airport, or public school system is not a private police department because the entity controlling the agency is publicly funded, elected, and/or part of a public government institution.

==== Examples ====
- California State University police departments (CSUPD)
- Port Authority of New York and New Jersey Police Department
- Los Angeles Airport Police
- Bay Area Rapid Transit Police Department
- Amtrak Police Department

== History ==
By the late 1960s, the private security industry was growing at a recession-resistant rate of 10-15% annually. Estimates of the number of private guards, investigators, and so on ranged from 350,000 to 800,000. From 1976 to 1981, there was a 20% increase in calls for police service. Demand existed for nonroutine services, such as police checks of vacationers' homes, escorts for merchants making bank deposits, extra patrols at business closing times, and so on. Around that same time, many police departments were facing budget freezes or cuts, and the number of police employees per 1,000 population dropped 10 percent between 1975 and 1985. Police adopted differential responses to requests for services, deprioritizing investigation of "cold" burglaries and larcenies. Private firms were employed to fill the gap. Private police and their clients have compiled extensive records on certain crimes, such as department store pilferage. It has been suggested that the private sector of policing in the future may increasingly assume the role of the public guardian of society, leaving public policing to a more narrow role that focuses on personal violence.

The origin of individual modern private police agencies vary in their original scope and purpose. For example, the San Francisco Patrol Special Police originally began as an agency intended to protect merchant operations from outlaws in the mid-1800's but, as of 2023, had shrunk down to only a single officer, and later shut down in 2024 after its last member retired.

== See also ==
- Privatization in criminal justice
- Private police
- Law enforcement in the United States
- Company police
- Railroad police
