= FedEx Air Carrier Police =

Company police of FedEx Corporation

- Logo of the FedEx Corporation

Agency overview
- Formed: 2002

Jurisdictional structure
- Operations jurisdiction: United States
- Legal jurisdiction: The state of Tennessee; FedEx-owned facilities; FedEx Express aircraft; Joint Terrorism Task Force operations
- Governing body: FedEx Corporation
- General nature: Civilian police

Operational structure
- Overseen by: Board of directors of the FedEx corporation
- Headquarters: Memphis, Tennessee, U.S.
- Agency executive: William Allen, Chief

The FedEx Air Carrier Police Department is a company police department and a sworn law enforcement agency in the state of Tennessee operated by the FedEx Corporation. The agency's name acknowledges that its legal authority is derived from a Tennessee law allowing the company's air carrier subsidiary, FedEx Express, to establish a police department. Despite its name, the agency serves the entire FedEx company and is authorized to carry out all law enforcement functions within the state of Tennessee. The department maintains intelligence sharing relationships with agencies across the country, and additional privileges as a member of the FBI's Joint Terrorism Task Force.

== History ==
Following the September 11 attacks, FedEx began lobbying the Tennessee General Assembly to allow it to establish a company police force, arguing that such a department would be analogous to the longstanding practice of granting railroads the authority to operate railroad police. In early 2002, then-state senator Steve Cohen introduced a bill to amend the law authorizing the existing federal Tennessee Valley Authority Police Department to include air carriers incorporated in Tennessee, namely the company's subsidiary FedEx Express. The bill met few objections, and was signed into law in July 2002. The department immediately hired 10 sworn officers. The department's first chief was Don Wright, who transferred from the Shelby County, Tennessee sheriff's department. He led the FedEx Police until 2008.

== Law enforcement activities ==
FedEx officers are commissioned by the Tennessee Department of Safety and Homeland Security and are required to complete training "substantially equivalent" to training for police departments in ordinary Tennessee municipalities. FedEx officers can investigate all types of crimes, request search warrants and make arrests anywhere in the state of Tennessee. In a 2003 interview with The Wall Street Journal, the company said its then-new department had started investigations related to fraud, and threats and suspicious mail directed against company executives, but turned all of the cases over to other agencies rather than making arrests itself. Little is known of the department's contemporary activities.

The department is part of the Memphis metropolitan area branch of the FBI’s Joint Terrorism Task Force, granting members of the agency federal security clearances to access classified information. FedEx is the only major airline which is a JTTF member.

== Controversy and criticism ==
The department has been criticized in the context of opposition to private policing in the United States writ large, and specifically as a potentially inappropriate way to garner access to protected federal information for anti-competitive purposes. It has also been criticized for operating in a secretive way, and for its partnership with the national surveillance camera and license plate reader network Flock. Flock has agreed to provide the department access to its AI-augmented public surveillance video feeds from law enforcement agencies partnered with the company, while FedEx contributes its own data provided by cameras fitted to delivery trucks and facilities. According to Forbes, the department has intelligence sharing relationships with many municipalities in the region, to include the Shelby County Sheriff’s Office and Memphis Police Department in Tennessee, and the police departments of Pittsboro and Greenwood Indiana.
