= Parapolice =

Type of law enforcement officer

Parapolice are law enforcement officers or intelligence agents considered "beyond", "ancillary" or "subsidiary" to the regular police force. The term has been used in criminology to refer to private security with an explicit relationship to public police forces.

Parapolice organizations are generally considered legally sanctioned bodies acting either beyond or in addition to the duties and responsibilities normally attributed to the public or state police. Parapolice organizations, therefore, can include all private security companies, auxiliary or adjunct police services, or other legal albeit politically motivated intimidation squads acting either at the behest or with the acquiescence of government and/or power elites.

== Geographic variation ==
The term seems to have developed slightly different normative meanings in northern versus southern and developing nations. In northern, democratic nations, parapolicing has acquired a critical connotation largely attached to an aggressive form of private security provision. Canadian sociologist, George Rigakos defines the New Parapolice as any "security company that explicitly attempts to bridge the gap between public and private police" constituting a "vanguard" force in emerging "risk markets". For Rigakos, the parapolice are a type of assertive private law enforcement and surveillance organization "that pushes the envelope" on what is legally permissible concerning citizens’ powers of arrest and trespass enforcement.

In southern, developing, and divided societies, parapolice have become synonymous with politically motivated intimidation squads. In some countries, like China, the parapolice are a state-organized policing agency charged with enforcing by-laws and other commercial regulations. They have been accused of intimidating and harassing unlicensed vendors, engaging in running street battles with local residents and environmentalists and even beating to death a man for taking images of a clash between villagers and the parapolice. In Brazil, Amnesty International has criticized the role of the parapolice, locally known as "milicia", for abduction, intimidation, torture and "wielding political power by guaranteeing, through intimidation, votes for certain state deputies". In Venezuela, parapolice have been blamed for the ‘social cleansing’ of poor men in the state of Portuguesa. The People’s Ombudsman reports that the parapolice are responsible for the killing of 402 people between 2001 and 2004. In Latin America, in particular, parapolice are synonymous with paramilitary vigilantism and political death squads.

== Examples ==
- Company police - as opposed to company security.
- Security company - a company that is responsible for the safety of employees of others companies, non-governmental organization or public administrations.
- City Urban Administrative and Law Enforcement Bureau - Chinese private police force.
- Bounty hunter - an individual who captures criminals for a reward.
- Private investigator - an investigator who works for a private detective agency or for any other company.

== See also ==
- State Police of Crawford and Erie Counties
- Auxiliary police
- Railroad police
- Security police
- Special police
- Company police
- Titushky
