= Security contractor =

Security contractor may refer to:

- Company police
- Private military company
- Private police
- Security company
- Security guard
- Mercenary

== See also ==
- Independent contractor
- Private defense agency
