= Union Pacific Police Department =

Private railroad police department of the Union Pacific Railroad

- Common name: Union Pacific Police
- Abbreviation: UPPD

Jurisdictional structure
- Operations jurisdiction: United States
- Legal jurisdiction: Union Pacific Railroad
- General nature: Civilian police
- Specialist jurisdiction: Railways, tramways, rail transit systems

Operational structure
- Headquarters: Omaha, Nebraska
- Agency executives: Tom Mengel, Chief of Police; Mark Rowley, Chief of Police

Website
- Official Website

The Union Pacific Police Department (UPPD) is a private railroad police department and the law enforcement agency of the Union Pacific Railroad, headquartered in Omaha, Nebraska. The UPPD is one of seven American Class I railroad law enforcement agencies, alongside those of Amtrak, BNSF, CSX, Canadian National, CPKC, and Norfolk Southern.

The UPPD and its "Special Agent" title were allegedly models for the Federal Bureau of Investigation when it was created in 1907.

== History ==
Prior to the formation of their own law enforcement agency, roughly around the 1850s, Union Pacific contracted with the North-Western Police Agency, later known as Pinkerton.

The UPPD itself originates with the Union Pacific Secret Services, the original law enforcement agency responsible for protecting Union Pacific trains and facilities. In the 1890s, Union Pacific organized the Union Pacific Bandit Hunters to combat outlaw gangs committing train robberies, which Union Pacific trains frequently fell victim to. The UPPD's history following this is unclear, and it is unknown exactly when the UPPD was formed in its present state.

During the COVID-19 pandemic, the UPPD, following similar cuts across Union Pacific, drastically reduced their number of on-duty Special Agents. In the Los Angeles area, the number of Special Agents was reduced from around 60 Special Agents to just eight.

== Line of duty deaths ==
As of 2025, 107 agents of the UPPD have been killed in the line of duty.

== Jurisdiction and duties ==
=== Jurisdiction ===
Union Pacific maintains a functioning police department staffed with officers given the title of Special Agent with jurisdiction over crimes against the railroad. Like most railroad police, its primary jurisdiction is unconventional, consisting of 54,116 miles (87,091 kilometers) of track in 23 western U.S. states.

Railroad police are certified state law enforcement officers with investigative and arresting powers both on and off railroad property if authorized by the state they are operating within. They also have interstate authority pursuant to federal law; railroad police powers have been expanded to include railroads other than the officer's employing agency. All of the states in Union Pacific's system authorize full police authority for Special Agents, except for Wyoming, which does not grant authority to railroad police at all.

=== Duties ===
Special Agents typically investigate major incidents such as derailments, sabotage, grade crossing accidents and hazardous material accidents and minor issues such as trespassing on the railroad right of way, vandalism/graffiti, and theft of company property or customer product. In accordance with their duties, Special Agents have the ability to access the NCIC database to run suspects and vehicles for wants and warrants, as well as criminal history checks.

Special Agents often coordinate and liaise with local, state, and federal law enforcement on issues concerning the railroad and are dispatched nationally through the Response Management Communications Center (RMCC) in Omaha, Nebraska.

== Equipment ==
Fleet

- Ford Explorer
- Ford Taurus
- Ford Expedition
- Dodge Ram
- Dodge Durango
- Chevrolet Tahoe

Weapons

- Glock pistol (Gen5 17 9mm)
- Colt M4
- Remington 870
