= Private police =

Law enforcement bodies owned and/or controlled by non-governmental entities

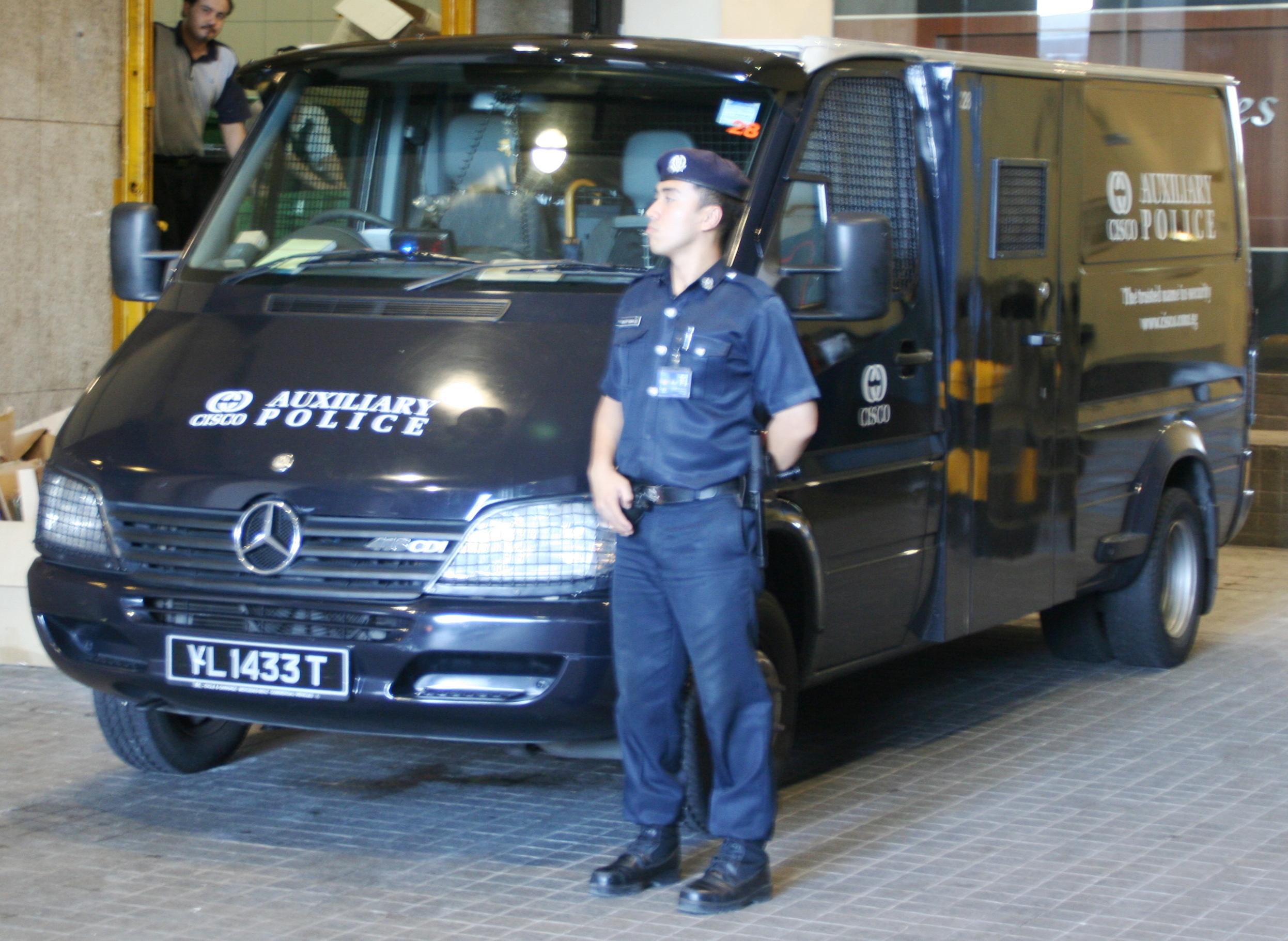
A Certis CISCO auxiliary police officer stands guard beside an armoured truck while his colleagues deliver high-valued goods to and from commercial clients at Change Alley, Singapore.

Private police or special police are types of law enforcement agencies owned and/or controlled by non-government entities. Additionally, the term can refer to an off-duty police officer while working for a private entity, providing security, or otherwise performing law enforcement-related services. Officers engaging in private police work have the power to enforce the law. However, the specific authority they have, and the terms used for it, vary from one place to another.

In jurisdictions that allow private police, private police may be employed and paid for by a non-governmental agency, such as a railroads, ports, campuses, nuclear facilities, and hospitals and other "special police" but they are peace officers or law enforcement officers who are commissioned, licensed, and regulated by the state. They are required to swear an oath to uphold the laws of the state where they are commissioned and follow the same regulations peace officers / law enforcement officers must abide by. The main difference between a private police officer and a regular police officer is their employer (the difference typically being public vs private entities) and jurisdiction.

Many people confuse private police with security guards. Security officers are regulated by the state, but generally do not have police powers, such as the ability to arrest on a warrant, or issue citations and summons for misdemeanor offenses. In contrast, most private police are sworn police officers employed by private entities, or even small governmental departments (such as library police, etc.).

Even though private police departments receive their commissions from the government, they are generally not considered government actors.

Private military companies providing law enforcement services may be referred to as private gendarmeries or private civil guards, due to their more militarized nature.

== Types of officers and terminology ==
=== Private police ===
Private police (also called company police) are commissioned police officers that are hired by a non-governmental agency, such as a university, hospital, port, nuclear facility, railroad, etc. These police officers swear an oath to the state or country (or both) they are commissioned in but are paid for by the private organization that hired them. Depending on the jurisdiction, they may have full police power within their jurisdictions or limited police powers. Private police officers are held to the same regulations and standards as regular police officers. Sometimes (but not all times) these officers are commissioned as "special police," the special-term delineating their narrow jurisdiction.

=== Special police ===
In some countries, like the United States, the term "special police" indicates a police force that has limited law enforcement powers. Special police may be employed by either a governmental agency or a non-governmental agency, and as such are not always private police.

Some states give local officials the ability to appoint special police officers with specific duties, either to assist local law enforcement or to provide assistance during an emergency. These officers may or may not be commissioned police officers, but generally have the same privileges and immunities as police officers. For example, some municipalities appoint special police as security for the municipal buildings and airports, freeing up commissioned police officers for general police duties. Special Police officers can be public officers (such as the WMATA Special Police in DC), or private officers, (such as the Metro Special Police Department's Special Police Officers).

Railroad police are sometimes classified as special police, but other times are recognized as fully-commissioned police officers under the Ombudsmen's Act, granting them multi-state jurisdiction.

=== Off-duty police officers ===
In jurisdictions that allow it, off-duty officers may be employed to provide security to individuals, or companies, or organizations. If their jurisdiction grants them police powers on and off-duty, they essentially become private police while employed by anyone other than the government.

The use of public police officers under private pay has become more and more contentious, as it is felt to be unfair competition against private security firms.

=== Security guards ===
Security guards are, by definition, not private police since they are not commissioned police officers. They are usually regulated by the government but lack many of the same police powers commissioned police officers are granted. Security officers are limited to their assigned properties (even if they travel between multiple properties), and can only take the action on public streets that a citizen might take. Security agencies range from "slick-belt" companies that merely observe and report incidents to police, to more well trained security agencies that detain subjects committing crimes, and have good relationships with their local police departments.

Government entities may employ private security personnel via contract, while others have their own security departments. Sometimes these officers have special police commissions, and some do not.

Security personnel can also take on auxiliary functions of police duties, such as administrative work, which constitutes a signification proportion of the workload of officers. It has been argued that police, who cost more than private security guards, are overqualified for such auxiliary duties because of their extensive training. One study found that outsourcing such functions to private contractors could reduce police forces’ operational expenditures by between 17% and 20% in the Canadian province of Quebec. The same study cited similar measures in the UK, which led to reductions in both crime rates and public expenditures on police.

== Examples ==
=== Canada ===
As in the United States, the largest private police forces in Canada are the railway police forces of the two largest rail carriers: Canadian Pacific Police Service (Canadian Pacific Railway) and Canadian National Police (Canadian National Railway). Both police forces' jurisdictions extend into those U.S. states where the respective companies operate. VIA Rail Canada Inc. also operate an armed police service, the VIA Rail Canada Police Service; however, they are a Crown Corporation under the purview of the Department of Transport Canada.

=== South Africa ===
An increasing number of South Africans are using private security companies to protect themselves and their assets. The broad private security industry is employing over 200,000 security guards throughout the country, of which the guarding industry is the largest, with 125,000 guards working for approximately 3,200 security companies. Many of the larger South African private security companies have expanded their operations into other countries in Southern Africa. Private security companies have even involved themselves in political conflicts that are occurring on the subcontinent. In South Africa, private companies that make use of guards are regulated by a statutory body, the Security Officers' Board. The Board polices the regulations that govern the private security industry and sets minimum training standards for security guards.

=== United Kingdom ===
A number of Port Police forces exist within the UK that are run by the respective port authorities, which are private companies. Legislation relating to Port Police dates back to the Harbours, Docks and Piers Clauses Act 1847, although subsequent legislation has been passed in relation to specific ports. Most Port Police have jurisdiction within 1 mile of port property. However, the Marine Navigation Act 2013 allows the Chief Constable of the local force to grant a port police force jurisdiction throughout England and Wales in relation to port business. The legislation was enacted after it emerged that the Port of Dover Police were acting unlawfully when transporting prisoners to custody when it was over a mile away from port property.

Until 2003, Oxford University both had a private police force, who had standard constabulary powers within 4 miles of any university building. In 2002, a group of local traders in Oxford wrote to Evan Harris, a local Member of Parliament, requesting the removal of the police powers of the Constables over citizens who were not members of the university. They argued that the Constables were "not accountable to any public authority" and described their role as an "anachronism".

After a policy review by the University Council in 2003, the Oxford University Police was disbanded when it was decided that it would be too expensive to bring the force up to the required standard of training and implement a multi-tiered complaints procedure.

=== United States ===
Within the United States, private police forces are law enforcement agencies which are owned, operated, or otherwise controlled by a non-governmental entity, such as a private corporation, private hospital, or private college, among other examples. Some private police agencies may provide contract-based law enforcement and security services to other entities in a manner similar to private security companies. When working for a private corporation, private police forces are commonly known as "company police".

The powers and authority of private police vary widely across the United States, though most jurisdictions provide that they may carry firearms and make arrests. Private police authority is generally limited to the property they are hired or contracted to protect, though this will also vary. Private police officers are generally required to be licensed the same as a "regular" police officer.

For example, special police officers in Washington, D.C. officers have full law enforcement authority and contract services to private, public and governmental organizations (though Washington D.C. governmental entities may also utilize special police officer commissions directly).

The prevalence of private policing also varies across the U.S., though most states permit, at minimum; private colleges, hospitals, and railways to maintain their own law enforcement agencies.

Private police services are sometimes called "subscription-based patrol", particularly in-reference to contracted services.

Railroad police, employed by the major Class I railroads, and campus police agencies of private colleges and universities make-up the majority of private police entities in the United States.

=== Other Locations ===
In Australia, private and public police have conventionally been considered parallel systems, with private security as very much the lesser or junior entity.

== Relationship to anarcho-capitalism ==
Private police features prominently in anarcho-capitalist theory and, along with advocacy of private defense agencies, dispute resolution organizations, and private production of law, distinguishes it from minarchism. It is argued that complete privatization of the police function (with funding, control, ownership, etc. of all police forces passing to private entities) would eliminate the ability of the state to forcibly collect taxes, and that arguably the only way it could work would be within the context of a society in which all other services were privatized as well. However, Edward Stringham has pointed out numerous examples to the contrary.

== History ==
In Great Britain, the police function was historically performed by private watchmen (existing from 1500 on), thief-takers, and so on. The former were funded by private individuals and organizations and the latter by privately funded rewards for catching criminals, who would then be compelled to return stolen property or pay restitution.

In 1737, George II began paying some London and Middlesex watchmen with tax money, beginning the shift to government control. In 1750, Henry Fielding began organizing a force of quasi-professional constables. The Macdaniel affair added further impetus for a publicly salaried police force that did not depend on rewards. Nonetheless, in 1828 there were privately financed police units in no fewer than 45 parishes within a 10-mile radius of London as the governmental London Metropolitan Police was just beginning.

== Perceived advantages ==
=== Advantages of private police for institutions and organizations ===
Benefits for having private police (instead of security guards) for railroads, ports, universities, schools, hospitals, and other organizations include:

- Since they are commissioned police officers, and not just security guards:
  - they can do things security guards can't do since they have additional powers granted by the state, including the power to arrest.
  - they have the same privileges and immunities as police officers since they are commissioned police officers.
  - The state regulates the private police and private police officers are held to higher standards than security guards are.
- The cost of the private police is shifted to the organization utilizing the police officers, and not to taxpayers.
- The police officers often specialize. For example, university police are trained to deal specifically with students, faculty, and dangers common to university campuses.
- The private police and regular police can engage in mutual assistance agreements, allowing them to work together.
- Municipal, county, parish, state, federal, or national police can use their resources elsewhere. Home security officers in gated communities like gated Residential neighborhoods may be considered private police if given arrest powers and the Right to give out warrants and tickets according to the Home owners association (HOA).

=== Advantages of private police as contractees of states ===
There is evidence that private police can provide services more cheaply than public police. The cost of San Francisco's private patrol specials is $25–30/hour, compared to $58/hour for an off-duty police officer. In Reminderville, Ohio, Corporate Security outbid the Summit County Sheriff Department's offer to charge the community $180,000 per year for 45-minute response time emergency service by offering a $90,000 contract for twice as many patrol cars and a 6-minute response time.

=== Advantages of private police as contractees of private citizens ===
Another advantage cited by Benson is that private police would have a contractual responsibility to protect their customers. In Warren v. District of Columbia, the court found that public police have no such responsibility. Thus, private police can be sued if they fail to respond to calls for help, for instance.

James F. Pastor addresses the disadvantages by analyzing a number of substantive legal and public policy issues which directly or indirectly relate to the provision of security services. These can be demonstrated by the logic of alternative or supplemental service providers. This is illustrated by the concept of "para-police." Para-police is another name for private police officers. Many public safety agencies use auxiliary police officers, who are part-time sworn police officers. Some also use reserve police officers, who are hired on an "as needed" basis, with limited police powers. These officers are typically called to duty for special details or events. In contrast to auxiliary and reserve officers, private policing is a relatively new and growing phenomenon. However, there are historical precedents such as the watchmen of medieval and early modern England and the Santa Hermandad of medieval and early modern Spain. These eventually became government-funded police, but some were originally privately organized.

There are several key distinctions between these options. Briefly, the distinctions relate to the level of police powers associated with the officer, the training levels required for each officer, the funding sources for the service provision, and the contractual and liability exposures related to each supplemental arrangement. Each alternative or supplemental service has its own strengths and weaknesses. The use of private police, however, has particular appeal because property or business owners can directly contract for public safety services, thereby providing welcome relief for municipal budgets. Finally, private police functions can be flexible, depending upon the financial, organizational, political, and situational circumstances of the client.

Under anarcho-capitalism, citizens would not have to fund police services through taxation. One argument against such a policy is that it would disadvantage the poor, who could not afford to spend much money on police. Thus, some more moderate libertarians favor issuing police vouchers to each citizen, granting them a certain amount of money to hire a private police company of their choice at taxpayer expense.

Murray Rothbard notes, "police service is not 'free'; it is paid for by the taxpayer, and the taxpayer is very often the poor person himself. He may very well be paying more in taxes for police now than he would in fees to private, and far more efficient, police companies. Furthermore, the police companies would be tapping a mass market; with the economies of such a larger-scale market, police protection would undoubtedly be much cheaper."

Public police are limited in size by the political jurisdiction, although some local public police forces already contract with national private firms for specialty services, such as maintenance of communications equipment, for which it would not be economical for them to hire a full-time government employee.

== Perceived disadvantages ==
Problems within the industry include the possibility of criminals setting up their own firms, misuse of surveillance devices, and strained relationships between the public and private police.

Ultimately, some people see the potential for a “dual system” of policing—one for the wealthy and one for the poor—and others see the provision of private security as the primary protective resource in the contemporary United States.

In Florida, Critical Intervention Services patrols neighborhoods and has deployed lethal force before. They have limited power, like other private security agencies in the state, regulated by Florida Statute 493.

There are regulatory mechanisms for private police, specifically the commissioning bodies of those agencies (such as the state's POST board, etc.). Additionally, people have the ability to file lawsuits more freely, as these officers are not protected by the sovereign immunity doctrine that defends municipal/governmental police personnel. In Florida, complaints can be made through the Florida Department of Law Enforcement.

Additionally, private police could be perceived as having a conflict of interest. For example, in Canada there are private police who serve the railways, namely the CN and CP Police. The conflict of interest became apparent when CP Police were sent to investigate an accident at CP, and the railroad ordered one of their officers to stop investigating and refused to provide information to that officer.

== Vagueness of the definition of "private police" ==
"Policing" and "private policing" are somewhat elusive concepts. "Private sector" police have been described as "any individual or group involved with law enforcement or security, but lacking official police authority." However, in many jurisdictions - particularly in the United States - private police agencies and or officers generally do have some form of statutory authority. At the core of the policing concept, though, is the combating of crime. Patrick Tinsley writes:

Enforcement of law is a phenomenon that admits of infinite degrees and permutations. Take the case of a jewelry store. The theft of its wares is a crime under the law. But the jewelry store does not rely exclusively— or even primarily —on the majesty of the state’s enforcement of that law for its own security. The jewelry store engages the services of manifold private protection outfits: it takes out an insurance policy on its gems, which are kept under a locked glass display case, which can only be opened by an employee, who is under the ever-vigilant eye of video monitoring equipment, and who watches the customers with the aid of convex mirrors, and keeps the store’s cash in a locked vault, which is in a back room, which is in turn locked at closing time, and the store’s alarm activated as the employees leave and the armed night watchmen arrive. All of these are provided by private companies in the business of providing “security,” and all of which should give pause to those who consider the enforcement of law uniquely the franchise of the government.

Private police, as conceptualised by Elizabeth E. Joh, would typically focus on loss instead of crime; preventive methods rather than punishment; private justice (such as firing embezzlers or issuing no trespassing warnings to shoplifters) rather than public court proceedings; and private property rather than public property.

== See also ==
- Law enforcement agency
- Law enforcement and society
- Police foundation
- Private investigator
- Privatization in criminal justice
- Security guard
- Watchman (law enforcement)
