= Peter Lambrinakos =

Canadian police officer and corporate security executive

Peter Lambrinakos OOM
- Παναγιώτης Λαμπρινάκος

Chief of Police of Via Rail Police Service
- In office March 16, 2015 – 2024
- Preceded by: Position established

Personal details
- Born: Panagiotis Lambrinakos Montreal, Quebec, Canada
- Education: McGill University
- Occupation: Chief of Police and Corporate Security

Peter Lambrinakos OOM (Greek: Παναγιώτης Λαμπρινάκος) is a Canadian police officer and corporate security executive, previously served as the first Chief of Police of the VIA Rail Canada Police Service and additionally as VIA Rail Canada’s Chief of Corporate Security from March 2015 to 2024. He has held various senior positions leading the Organized Crime, Major Crime, Economic Crime and Intelligence units with the Montreal Police Service.

== Early life and education ==
Lambrinakos was born in Montreal, Quebec, to Greek parents. He holds a Bachelor of Commerce degree with a Major in Economics from McGill University.

== VIA Rail Canada Police Service ==
Lambrinakos created VIA Rail's Corporate Security Strategy to protect VIA Rail's passengers, employees and infrastructure.

=== Creation of the VIA Rail Police ===
Lambrinakos also formed the VIA Rail Canada Police Service, Canada's first passenger railway police dedicated to ensuring the safety and security of inter-city rail in Canada.

== Montreal Police Service ==
Lambrinakos began his policing career in 1989 with the Montreal Police Service moving up the ranks to head teams dedicated to the fight against child sexual exploitation for commercial purposes, leading child kidnapping investigations, and overseeing investigations involving violent street gangs.

=== Creation of the Montreal Police Metro Unit ===
In 2007, Lambrinakos became the first Chief of the Montreal Police Metro Unit. He played a vital role in creating this new transit police unit responsible for the public safety in the Montreal Metro (subway), Canada's second-busiest rapid transit system and North America's fourth busiest rapid transit system.

=== Capture of Luka Magnotta ===
In 2012, Lambrinakos became Chief of the Major and Economic Crimes Division in charge of the Homicide, Cold Case, Sexual Assault, Commercial Sexual Exploitation of Children, Robbery, Arson and Fraud units. He also was in charge of the Crisis Negotiations and Hostage Rescue and Barricaded Persons Structure. During this time, Lambrinakos was the commanding officer regarding the investigation of the murder of Jun Lin, a Chinese international student murdered by Luka Rocco Magnotta. Magnotta fled from Montreal to Paris after posting a video recording of the murder online and mailing the body parts to schools and Canadian federal Conservative and Liberal political parties.

On May 31, 2012, INTERPOL issued a Red Notice for Magnotta at the Montreal Police Service Homicide unit's request to locate and provisionally arrest him pending extradition. The investigation then turned into an international hunt by law enforcement authorities in Canada, the United States, France, Germany and other countries. Magnotta was arrested at an Internet café in Berlin while reading news about himself. As a matter of "national interest," a sensitive military mission was ordered by the Canadian national defence minister following the request by Lambrinakos to assist Montreal Police in repatriating Magnotta back to Canada. A team of homicide detectives transported Magnotta back on a Royal Canadian Air Force Airbus CC-150 Polaris jet aircraft. This investigation was chosen as Canada's Newsmaker of the Year by The Canadian Press in 2012. In December 2019, Netflix released a documentary series based on these events called Don't F**k With Cats: Hunting an Internet Killer.

== Governor in Council appointment ==
Lambrinakos was appointed by Her Excellency the Governor General in Council, on the recommendation of the Minister of National Defence, as a Commission Member of the Military Police Complaints Commission of Canada from 2023 to 2026. The Commission is a civilian, quasi-judicial oversight agency that operates at arm's length from the Government of Canada.

== Other activities ==
Lambrinakos currently serves as a Director on the Board of Directors for two organizations: Operation Lifesaver Canada and St. John Ambulance, Quebec Council.

He also represents North America as a member of the International Union of Railways (UIC) Security Platform, which comprises 194 railway companies or entity members. The platform aims to keep individuals, data, goods, and infrastructure safe from various threats. Additionally, Lambrinakos holds the position of Chair for the UIC Security Platform Human Factors Working Group.

Furthermore, Lambrinakos was a police consultant to the Canadian drama film Boost, released in 2017. In 2018 the film was nominated for five Canadian Screen Awards at the 6th Canadian Screen Awards and eight Iris Awards at the 20th Quebec Cinema Awards.

== Honours ==
In 2015, Lambrinakos was invested as a Member of the Order of Merit of the Police Forces (MOM). In 2021 he was promoted within the Order to Officer (OOM) by the Governor General of Canada.

Ribbon	Description	Notes
	Order of Merit of the Police Forces (OOM)	– Officer: 28 January 2021 – Member: 8 January 2015
	Police Exemplary Service Medal	– 1st Bar: 28 August 2019 – Medal: 28 August 2014
