= Privatization in the United States =

Transfer of corporate ownership from the public to private sector

Privatization is the process of transferring ownership of a business, enterprise, agency, charity or public service from the public sector (the state or government) or common use to the private sector (businesses that operate for a private profit) or to private non-profit organizations. In a broader sense, privatization refers to transfer of any government function to the private sector - including governmental functions like revenue collection and law enforcement.

The term "privatization" has also been used to describe two unrelated transactions. The first is a buyout, by the majority owner, of all shares of a public corporation or holding company's stock, privatizing a publicly traded stock, and often described as private equity. The second is a demutualization of a mutual organization or cooperative to form a joint stock company.

Privatization can be accomplished through various methods, including:

1. Private provision of various services and supplies such as laboratory work, meter reading, and supplying chemicals;
2. Private contracting for operation and maintenance of public assets like water utility. (both 1 and 2 are often referred to as “outsourcing”);
3. Negotiating a contract with a private firm for the design, construction, and operation of new facilities (this option is referred to as design, build, and operate, or DBO); and
4. Outright sale of public assets to a private company.

In the United States, the contracting of management and operations to a private provider (outsourcing) has been more common than the sale of utility assets to private companies. No major U.S. city has sold its utility assets in recent decades, although some smaller water utilities have done so.

== Major areas of privatization in the US ==
=== Medicare and Medicaid managed care ===
In the United States, under the Medicare managed care the government pays a managed care organization (MCO) a fixed amount called the "capitated rate" for all medical services received by a beneficiary in a given period. Enrollment in the programs has increased substantially since 1990; in 2002 60% of Medicaid beneficiaries and 12% of Medicare beneficiaries were being treated by MCOs. Private sector involvement in Medicare and Medicaid is not limited to MCOs; private doctors, hospitals, nursing homes provide medical care; reimbursement claims are processed by private intermediaries; and peer review organizations, utilization review committees and accreditation organizations like JCAHO are staffed by private medical personnel.

One of the primary recipients of U.S. outsourcing contracts is Maximus Inc., which administers Medicaid and Medicare, as well as the Children's Health Insurance Program (CHIP), welfare-to-work, child support enforcement, and other government programs.

=== Welfare privatization ===
Homeless shelters and food banks are run by private organizations, who also provide treatment services, operate Head Start programs and work with child welfare agencies. Privatization of welfare system expanded in 1996, when the Aid to Families with Dependent Child (AFDC) program was replaced with the Temporary Aid to Needy Families (TANF) program. Welfare services that are often privatized include workforce development, job training and job placement are often privatized.

=== Public education ===
There is also some private sector involvement in the public education system including charter schools, Educational Management Organizations (EMOs), and school voucher programs. EMOs are usually for-profit and manage charter schools and sometimes traditional public schools as well. The United States Supreme Court upheld school voucher programs against an Establishment Clause challenge in Zelman v. Simmons-Harris.

=== Private prisons ===
In the US, private prison facilities housed 12.3% of all federal prisoners and 5.8% of state prisoners in 2001. Contracts for these private prisons regulate prison conditions and operation, but the nature of running a prison requires a substantial exercise of discretion. Private prisons are more exposed to liability than state run prisons.

=== Foreign affairs ===
Both for-profit and non-profit entities are tasked with various responsibilities related to the US foreign aid budget such as providing emergency humanitarian relief, development assistance, as well as post-conflict reconstruction efforts. Similarly, private entities have started to perform tasks that have traditionally been regarded as falling within the government's diplomatic and military authority like participating in peace negotiations, military training, intelligence gathering and other security services or combat-related missions. Many of the military interrogators at Abu Ghraib prison were provided by a private contractor and lacked formal military training; this was subsequently identified as a contributing factor to detainee abuse at the prison by the Fay report.

The United Nations uses private subcontractors as well, and in some cases, "failed states" have relied on private entities extensively for a range of tasks including building critical infrastructure, managing social services programs and using private military companies during the course of armed conflicts.

== US Constitution ==
The United States Constitution only constrains state action and, with few exceptions, "erects no shield against merely private conduct, however discriminatory or wrongful". Gillian Metzger writes:

Adequately guarding against abuse of public power requires application of constitutional principles to every exercise of state authority, regardless of the formal public or private status of the actor involved: 'It surely cannot be that government, state or federal, is able to evade the most solemn obligations imposed in the Constitution by simply resorting to the corporate form' and thereby transferring operation of government programs to private hands"

Even if private actors cannot be held accountable through the traditional constitutional mechanism, they may be bound by other regulatory or contractual requirements. Tort law might be another avenue of protection, and some may argue that this protection could be even more effective as public agencies and employees usually enjoy some degree of immunity from civil liability.

== Criticism ==
Historically, governments have at times turned government-run institutions into privately held corporations or simply abolished the publicly run institution in order for privately owned competition to enter and compete in the market in question. However, critics often point out that historical methods of privatization were quite different than modern methods. For example, in the United States in the 19th century, a corporation might be chartered by a public entity, such as a municipality, for a very specific purpose (for example, constructing New York's Central Park) with significant constraints on its purpose, task, and duration. Such a corporation would then often cease to exist after its purpose had been fulfilled. This kind of public-private partnership differs in significant ways from a common modern form, where publicly held services or resources might be handed over to a private company with few stipulations and for an indefinite period of time.

Critics of privatization also charge that lucrative contracts may be given to political allies, relatives or friends of public officials and that subsequently, these contractors may not qualified to do the work and/or may provide less quality to the general public. For example, in 2006 the LA Times reported on this pattern in an article stating that for "Indianapolis, New Orleans, Atlanta and other cities, privatization has been accompanied by corruption scandals, environmental violations and a torrent of customer complaints."

Another criticism of privatization, particularly in regard to municipal services such as water utilities, is that some municipalities have seen unacceptable increases in prices of services while seeing also a decrease in the quality of service and level of maintenance of the utility. For example, in Jacksonville, Florida, a company called United Water Resources owned and operated the municipal water system. After monthly bills increased in 1997 by almost $10 per month, and further requests for rate hikes later as well. The municipality's public utility, JEA, decided to buy the water system for $219 million, projecting that this would actually save customers 25% on monthly bills. On the other hand, publicly managed utilities have occasionally reported trouble as well. The New York Times reported in 2004 that a consortium of citizen's groups had won a suit against the city of Los Angeles to repair 488 miles of sewer lines and conduct other maintenance.

== Factors that lead to privatization ==
There are several leading factors that contribute to municipal or county governments outsourcing. Economics in the format that governments can operate in a more manageable and effective manner. Public administrations have been criticized for their lack of effective service. The quality of service may be slow and employees may not be held accountable for their responsibilities. The view by the public is that public organizations are not friendly, and removed from high-quality public service, the lack of public relations, and training show in the inability of their personnel to deal with the public.

Privatization is thought to be a valuable policy instrument that leads to a greater good. Privatization of public resources injects new value into public assets and increases the privately held capital base of a country. Governments that implement privatization as part of their reforms use it as a mechanism to pursue a variety of objectives, both macroeconomic and fiscal. Governments undertaking privatization have pursued a variety of objectives. In some cases, privatization is a means of achieving gains in economic efficiency, given the extensive prevalence of poor economic performance of public enterprises in many countries and limited success with their reform. Privatization can also be a mechanism for improving the fiscal position, particularly in cases where governments have been unwilling or unable to continue to finance deficits in the public enterprise sector.

The decision as to whether to transfer ownership or operations of a public water utility to a private firm is complex. Immediate economic questions such as “Won't privatization increase customers’ monthly water bills?” are accompanied by larger and longer-term questions relating to public health, employment, political control, environmental issues, and relations with other city services.

== See also ==
- Water privatization in the United States
- Private police in the United States
- Private school#United States
- Social Security debate in the United States

== Literature ==
- The Wrecking Crew: How Conservatives Rule
