= Via Rail Police Service =

Via Rail Canada Police Service Service de police de Via Rail Canada
- Heraldic Badge of the VRCPS

- Shoulder flash of the VRCPS

- Flag of the VRCPS
- Common name: Via Rail Police
- Abbreviation: VRCPS

Agency overview
- Formed: 2015

Jurisdictional structure
- Operations jurisdiction: Canada
- Legal jurisdiction: Federal
- Constituting instrument: Railway Safety Act
- General nature: Civilian police

Operational structure
- Headquarters: 3 Place Ville Marie, Suite 500; Montreal, Quebec
- Elected officer responsible: Steven MacKinnon, Minister of Transport
- Parent agency: Via Rail Canada Inc.

Website
- www.viarail.ca/en/travel-information/security

The Via Rail Canada Police Service (VRCPS) (French: Service de police de Via Rail Canada (SPVRC)) is the federal railway police service of the Canadian intercity passenger rail operator, Via Rail Canada Inc.

The agency was formed in 2015 under the Railway Safety Act with Peter Lambrinakos becoming Via Rail’s first chief of police and chief of corporate security. As a railway police service, the agency is under the purview of the Department of Transport Canada.

== Authority ==
As indicated under Canada's federal Railway Safety Act, Via Rail police constables are appointed by a judge of a superior court for the enforcement of the laws of Canada or a province in so far as their enforcement relates to the protection of property owned, possessed or administered by Via Rail and for the protection of persons and property on their property.

Via Rail is mandated to operate intercity, regional and transcontinental trains linking over 400 communities across Canada. The police constables have jurisdiction on property under the administration of Via Rail and in any place within 500 metres of property that Via Rail owns, possesses or administers.

== Operations ==
The Via Rail Police deploy at Via Rail passenger train stations, along the rights-of-way on which Via Rail trains operate, and on board Via Rail trains to prevent security incidents and to exercise response and counterterrorism capabilities, including events such as the 2013 Via Rail Canada terrorism plot.

Via Rail Police work closely with the other two federal railway police services, the CN Police and CPKC Police, as well as many local police services of jurisdiction throughout the country to respond and investigate both provincial and federal crimes, such as drug trafficking and human trafficking, and further assist with many missing persons investigations. They enforce all provincial acts on properties and roadways within their jurisdiction, including provincial liquor licence acts, trespass acts and highway traffic acts.

Via Rail Police also undertake a collaborative approach with various law enforcement and community partners to educate the general public, including many young people at schools, on topics related to rail safety in an effort to reduce track-level incidents.

=== Via Rail Canada terror plot ===
On March 20, 2015, Chiheb Esseghaier and Raed Jaser were sentenced to life in prison for conspiring to commit murder for a terrorist group following a conspiracy to derail a train route operated by Amtrak and Via Rail, known as the Maple Leaf, running between Toronto and New York City.

=== Canine unit ===
The Via Rail Police has its own canine unit and deploys vapor wake dogs to alert their human police canine handlers to the presence of threats. These police dogs can quickly screen and track the trail of a scent through large crowds of people. The canine unit was decommissioned in Dec 2024.

=== Use of force equipment ===
- Glock 17 pistol
- Glock 19 pistol
- Taser 7
- Expandable baton
- OC Spray

=== Rank structure ===
- Chief of Police
- Deputy Chief of Police
- Inspector
- Staff Sergeant
- Sergeant
- Constable

== See also ==
- Railroad police
- Transport Canada
- Law enforcement in Canada
- List of law enforcement agencies in Canada
