= Privatization in criminal justice =

Shift to private ownership & control of criminal justice services

Privatization in criminal justice refers to a shift to private ownership and control of criminal justice services. The term is often used to refer simply to contracting out services, which takes place extensively in many countries today. For example, various prison services may be provided piecemeal by private vendors. Taken to its fullest extreme, however, privatization entails private-sector control over all the decisions regarding the use of resources devoted to the protection of persons and property.

== Reasons ==
Many criminal justice services are privatized because the government lacks the means to carry them out. For example, private bail bondsmen help enforce the laws requiring those released on bail to appear for trial. If the defendant disappears, the bondsman may hire a bounty hunter to find them and bring them back.

Bail bond agents also have a monetary incentive to make an accurate assessment as to the defendant's likelihood of jumping bail; if he declines to grant a bond to an individual who would have shown up to trial, then he loses business, but if he grants bail to a person who jumps bail, then he suffers a financial loss. The government does not have such incentives built into its decision-making mechanisms for pretrial release.

== History ==
In the mid-1960s, Florida Governor Claude Kirk commissioned Wackenhut Services for a $500,000 "war on organized crime" contract that led to more than 80 criminal indictments, including many local politicians and government employees. Multi-State, a firm established by a former Columbus, Ohio police chief and employed thirteen former police officers with narcotics experience in 1973 "rented" skilled narcotics agents to small-town police forces in Ohio and West Virginia; more than 150 arrests and seizures of $200,000 in drugs took place.

In 1993, the Kentwood, Michigan police department signed a three-year contract with a private firm to investigate and recover bad checks. The contractor handles all merchant contacts, telephone calls regarding bad checks, and investigations, in an effort to recover the face value of the check as well as the expenses for both the merchant and the police department.

According to Wyoming Detective James Maguffee, "They've got a great track record...It's just been a phenomenal success."

In Switzerland, Securitas provides police services for more than 30 Swiss villages and townships. Paradise Island also has a private police force.

In 1975, Oro Valley, Arizona contracted for police services with Rural/Metro Fire Department but the arrangement was challenged by the Arizona Law Enforcement Officers Advisory Council. Rural/Metro could not pay the legal fees needed to fight the challenge and the arrangement was ended in 1977.

In some cases, private police are deputized in order to ensure compliance with the law, but continue to be paid by the hour so that money can be saved by releasing them during slow times; as when Kalamazoo, Michigan contracted for street patrol and traffic control with Charles Services. Other jurisdictions that have had contracts for police services with private firms include Indian Springs, Florida, Buffalo Creek, West Virginia (which was served by Guardsmark) and Reminderville, Ohio which contracted with Corporate Security in 1981; as well as Sussex, New Jersey, which contracted for police services with Executive Security and Investigations Services after the town's entire four-officer police force was dismissed in 1993 because of a drug scandal.

In the United States, policy manuals for policing are written by Lexipol, a private company, which are then implemented by thousands of law enforcement agencies, particularly small and medium-sized departments.

== See also ==
- Private prison
- Private security
- Private police
