= James F. Pastor =

- Known for: Terrorism expert, Security consultant, Former Chicago Police Officer
- Police career
- Country: Chicago Police Department
- Status: Retired
- Other work: Founder and Principal Expert, SecureLaw LLC

James F. Pastor is an expert in terrorism, security, public safety and police matters.

Dr. Pastor's educational and instructional experience included: Associate Professor of Public Safety at Calumet College of St. Joseph, an adjunct instructor for the International Law Enforcement Academy (ILEA) a State Department sponsored program where he taught classes to police officials from countries throughout the world, and an adjunct instructor for Northwestern University Center for Public Safety where he taught law to police executives from throughout the U.S.

He is also founder and principal expert with SecureLaw LLC, a Security & Legal Consultancy.

Dr. Pastor has appeared as an expert witness in numerous trials relating to police procedures, premises liability, and security methods. He is regularly sought out to speak on the topics surrounding terrorism, security, public safety and police matters by the media as well as industry.

Dr. Pastor has authored four books, including his latest: You Say You Want a Revolution: A Compelling & Cautionary Tale of What Lies Ahead, Defiance Press & Publishing (see cites for earlier books) and contributed author to leading academic and professional journals.

Dr. Pastor started his career with the Chicago Police Department where he served as a tactical police officer in the Gang Crime Enforcement unit combating Chicago gangs including the El Rukn, a group with ties to international terrorist groups. He later served as an Assistant Department Advocate where he represented the department in internal disciplinary matters, including hundreds of use of force cases. As an attorney, he also represented two police unions and five security firms including serving as Legal Counsel/Operational Auditor for SecurityLink.

Dr. Pastor was a member of ASIS and former member of the Illinois Association of Chiefs of Police, the Association of Threat Assessment Professionals and past board member of the International Association of Professional Security Consultants (IAPSC).

Pastor served in various legal positions, including as general counsel with the Restored Church of God, and as legal counsel for Securitas Electronic Security, Inc.
