= BNSF Police Department =

Private railroad police department of the Burlington Northern and Santa Fe Railway

Burlington Northern and Santa Fe Railway Police Department
- Common name: BNSF Police Department
- Abbreviation: BNSFPD

Agency overview
- Formed: 1996
- Preceding agencies: Burlington Northern Railroad Police; Santa Fe Railway Police

Jurisdictional structure
- Operations jurisdiction: United States
- Legal jurisdiction: Burlington Northern and Santa Fe Railway
- General nature: Civilian police
- Specialist jurisdiction: Railways, tramways, rail transit systems

Operational structure
- Headquarters: Fort Worth, Texas
- Agency executives: Bryan Laurie, Chief of Police

Website
- Official Website

The BNSF Police Department or the Burlington Northern and Santa Fe Railway Police Department (BNSFPD) is a private railroad police department and the law enforcement agency of the BNSF Railway, headquartered in Fort Worth, Texas. The BNSFPD is one of six American Class I railroad law enforcement agencies, alongside those of Amtrak, CSX, Kansas City Southern, Norfolk Southern, and Union Pacific.

== Jurisdiction ==
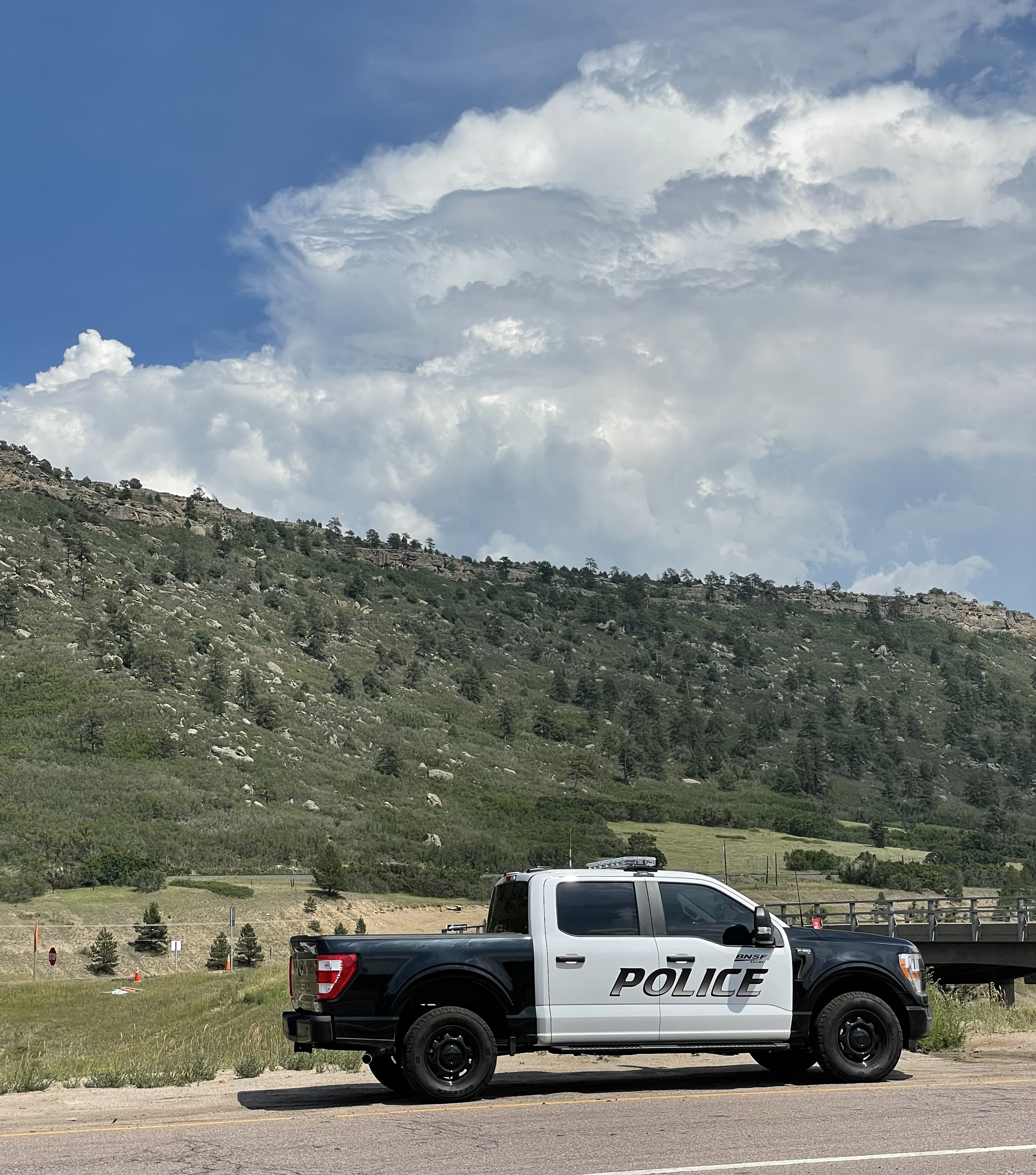
A BNSF Police Department vehicle off I-25 in Douglas County, Colorado

BNSF maintains a functioning police department staffed with officers given the title of Special Agent with jurisdiction over crimes against the railroad. Like most railroad police, its primary jurisdiction is unconventional, consisting of 34,000 miles of track in 28 western U.S. states. Railroad police are certified state law enforcement officers, authorized under federal law, to operate as such in any state that allows railroad police authority under state law.

BNSF Special Agents may have investigative and arrest powers both on and off railroad property if authorized by the state in which they are working. They carry interstate authority as provided by federal law, allowing railroad police to conduct law enforcement activities in other states the railroads operate in.

Special Agents typically investigate major incidents such as derailments, sabotage, grade crossing accidents and hazardous material accidents and minor issues such as trespassing on the railroad right of way, vandalism/graffiti, and theft of company property or customer product.

Special Agents often coordinate and liaise with local, state, and federal law enforcement on issues concerning the railroad and are dispatched nationally through BNSF Headquarters in Fort Worth.

== Line of duty deaths ==
As of 2025, 57 special agents and 1 K9 of the BNSF Police Department have been killed in the line of duty
