= Canadian National Police Service =

Private railroad police force

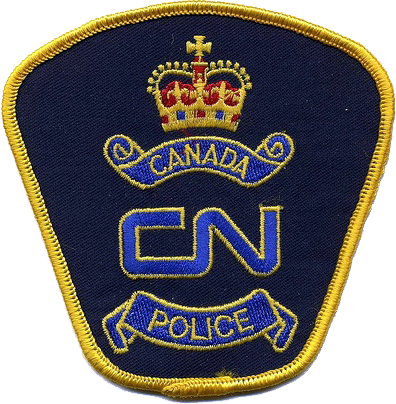
- Common name: CN Police Service, CN Police North America
- Abbreviation: CNPS

Agency overview
- Formed: 1923

Jurisdictional structure
- International agency
- Countries: Canada; United States
- Legal jurisdiction: Federal, State, Provincial
- Constituting instrument: Railway Safety Act of Canada 49 U.S.C. § 28101
- General nature: Civilian police
- Specialist jurisdiction: Railways, tramways, rail transit systems

Operational structure
- Headquarters: 935 de La Gauchetière Street West, Montreal, Quebec, Canada
- Constables: 95 (as of 2016)
- Special Agents: 15 (as of 2016)
- Agency executive: Shawn Will, Chief of Police and Chief Security Officer
- Parent agency: Canadian National Railway

Website
- CN Police Service

The Canadian National Police Service (commonly referred to as the CN Police or the CN Rail Police) is a private railway police force protecting the property, personnel, and rail infrastructure of the Canadian National Railway in Canada and the United States.

== History ==
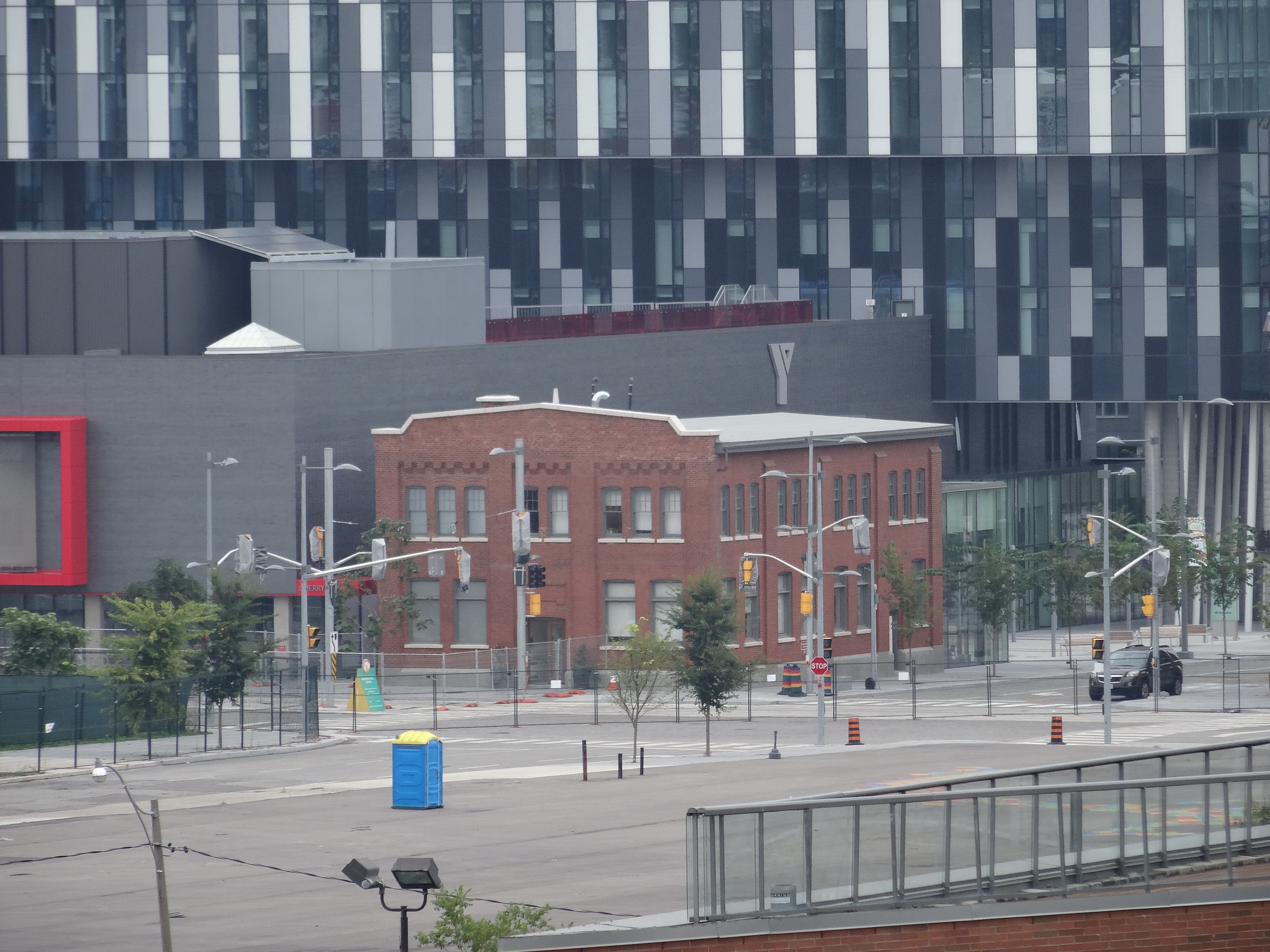
The old CN Rail police Toronto detachment in 2015.

Prior to the First World War, the Government of Canada owned four independent railways: the Intercolonial Railway, which had been established to link the Grand Trunk Railway's line in Montreal with the Port of Halifax; the Prince Edward Island Railway, which fell into Government ownership after going bankrupt in the late 19th century; the Hudson Bay Railway, which had been established to finish a portion of the Canadian Northern Railway; and the National Transcontinental Railway, which had been established to construct the Grand Trunk line from Winnipeg to Moncton. These four railways were organized under Canadian Government Railways, which operated each constituent railway separately. After the war, the Government Railways became increasingly centralized, absorbing the Canadian Northern and Grand Trunk Pacific railways before being renamed Canadian National and finally absorbing the Grand Trunk Railway in January 1923. The Canadian National Police Service was first established on April 1 of that year, as the Department of Investigation.

As the responsibilities of the Canadian National Railway expanded, so too did the responsibilities of its police service. Up until the late 20th-century, the force was responsible for the Crown corporation's airline, ferries, hotels, and the CN Tower, which was only severed from the railway in the 1990s.

After the railway was privatized in 1992, the police service expanded through acquisitions and amalgamations with other railway police forces: the Illinois Central and Illinois Central Gulf police forces in 1998, the Wisconsin Central Railroad police in 2001, the Bessemer and Lake Erie and Affiliated Railroads Police in 2004, and the BC Rail police in 2005.

== Organization ==
=== Authority ===
==== Canada ====
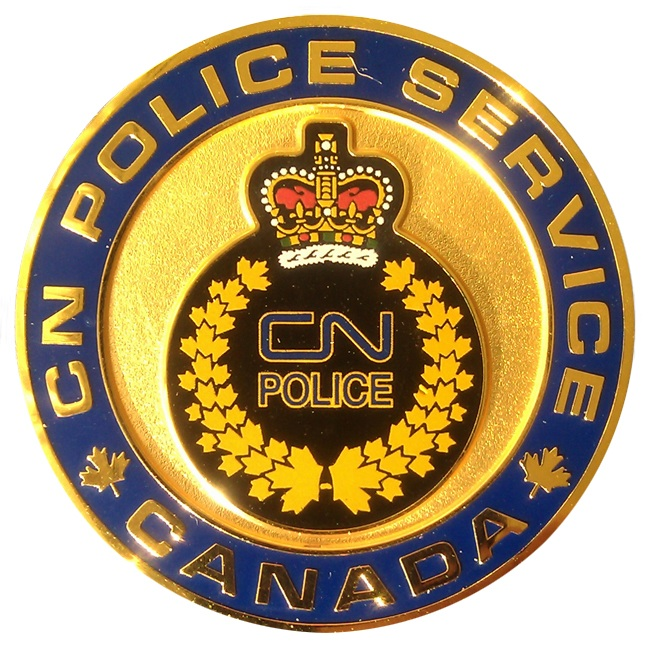
Challenge coin for Canadian officers

In Canada, members are federally sworn in under section 44.1 of the Railway Safety Act granting powers as police constables and have the same powers of arrest as any police officer in Canada anywhere in Canada as 'Peace Officers' under Section 2 of the Criminal Code. Police constables are employed by Canadian National and are also considered public servants, sworn to the Crown to uphold the law and protect.

The CN Police federal oath of office primarily directs their duties 'on and along' CN infrastructure, protecting properties owned and administered by CN. CN Police have additional provincial appointments which allow them to extend provincial enforcement such as the Highway Traffic Act outside the boundaries set under the Railway Safety Act of Canada.

Under section 26.1 of the Railway Safety Act, it is an offence for any person to "enter on land on which a line work is situated". Offenders can be dealt with in multiple ways such as being compelled to Federal Court by means of a promise to appear, or being issued a ticket through the relevant provincial Contravention Act and released. Maximum penalties for contravention of the act for any offence can be up to a $10,000 fine and imprisonment in the case of a private person. A company may also face up to a $200,000 fine for contravention of this act.

==== United States ====
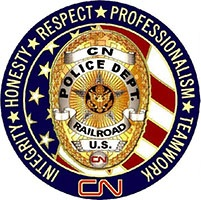
Challenge coin for U.S. officers

In the U.S., each state in which CN operates grants police powers to CN police officers and special agents. State specific powers are also augmented by interstate authority granted by the United States Secretary of Transportation (Code 49 U.S.C. 28101), meaning officers have police powers related to the railway in all states the CN railway operates. Individual states may expand this authority within their borders.

=== Divisions ===
The Police Service's corporate headquarters is located in Montreal, Quebec, while its regional headquarters (serving the United States) is located in Homewood, Illinois.

==== Canada ====
Canada is divided into five operational divisions: the Pacific Division, based in Surrey, British Columbia; the Mountain Division, based in Edmonton, Alberta; the Prairie Division, based in Winnipeg, Manitoba; the Great Lakes Division, based in Vaughan, Ontario; and the Champlain Division, based in Montreal, Quebec.

==== United States ====
In the United States, CN Police operations are divided into three divisions: the North Division, based in Lake Orion, Michigan; the Central Division, based in Harvey, Illinois; and the South Division, based in Memphis, Tennessee.

== Training ==
In Canada, all CN police officers are trained at various accredited Police training academies such as Ontario Police College in Aylmer, Ontario, RCMP Depot in Regina, Saskatchewan, or Winnipeg Police Service located in Winnipeg, Manitoba.

== Equipment ==
- Ford Police Interceptor Utility

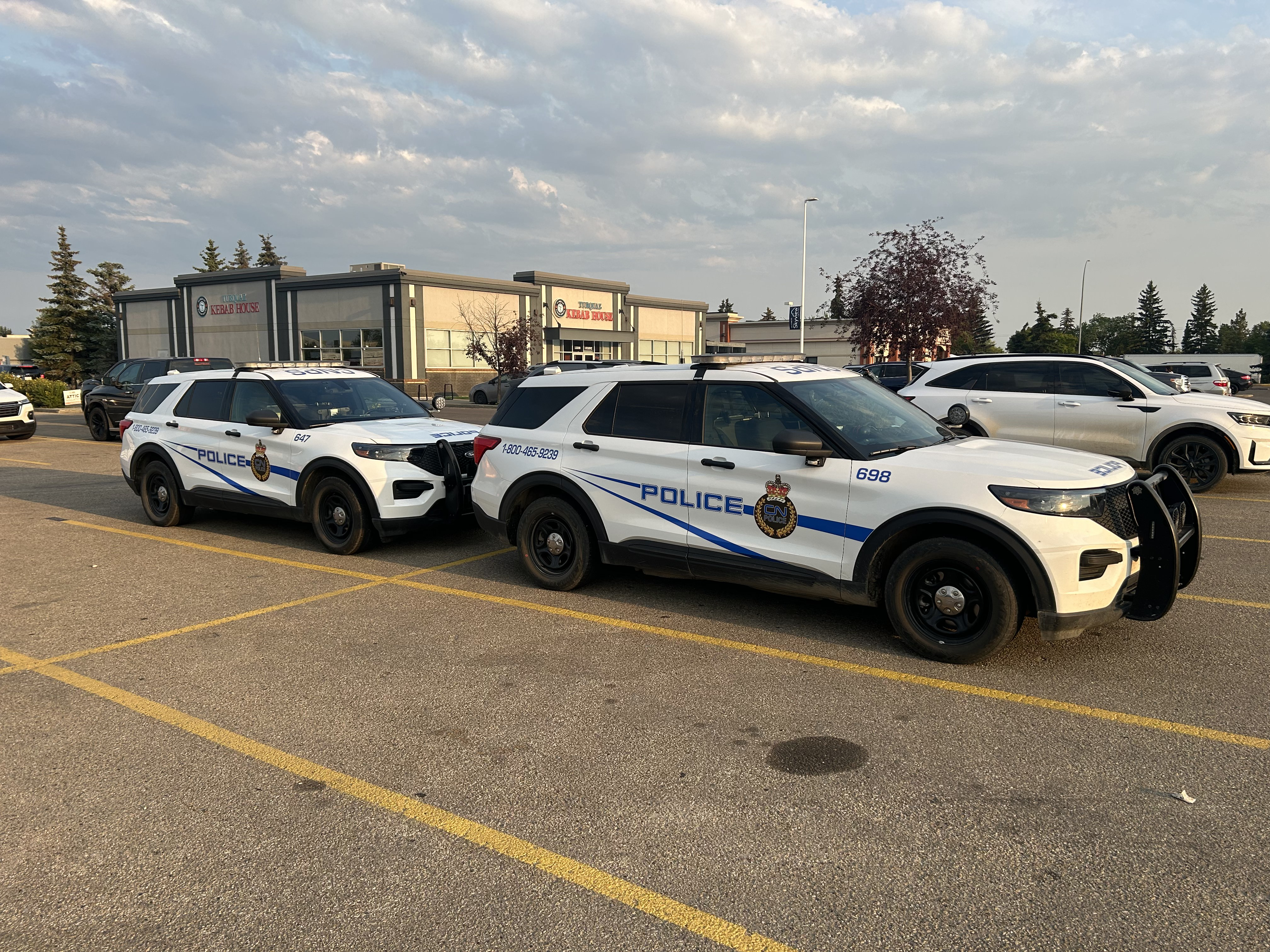
Pair of Canadian National Railway Police Cruisers

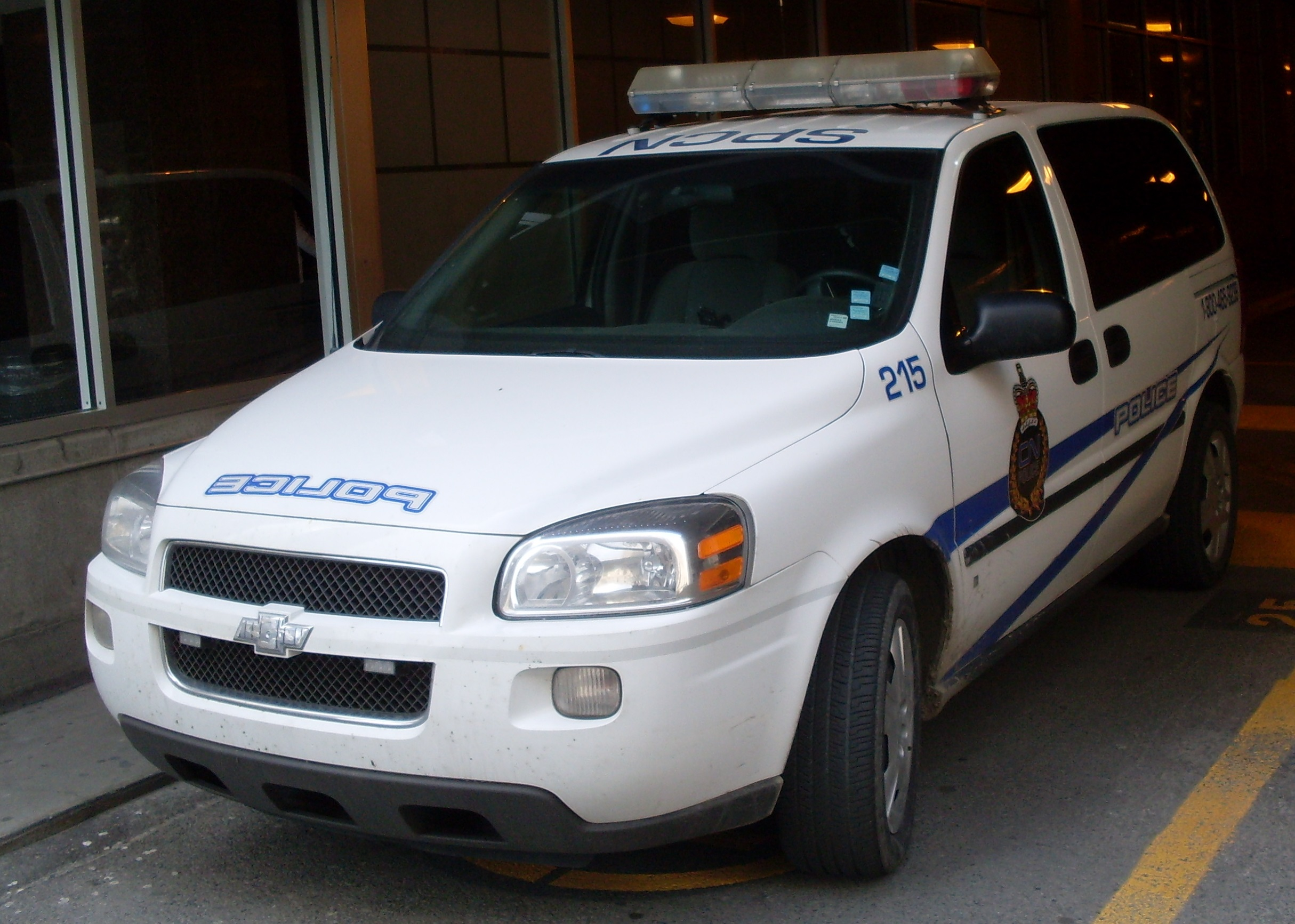
A Chevrolet Uplander used by the Canadian National Railway Police.

== See also ==
Other private railroad police departments:

- Canadian Pacific Kansas City Police Service
- Via Rail Police Service
- Amtrak Police Department
- BNSF Police Department
- Union Pacific Police Department
