= Powers of the police in the United Kingdom =

The powers of the police differ between the three legal systems of the United Kingdom.

- Powers of the police in England and Wales
- Powers of the police in Scotland
- Powers of the police in Northern Ireland
- Police child protection powers in the United Kingdom
