= Railroad police =

Police forces of rail transport

Railroad police or railway police are people responsible for protecting railroad (or railway) properties, facilities, revenue, equipment (train cars and locomotives), and personnel, as well as carrying passengers and cargo. Railroad police may also patrol public rail transit systems.

Their exact roles differ from country to country. In some countries, the powers of railroad police are no different from those of any other sworn law enforcement officer, while in others, they are more like security guards. Some are also given extensive additional authority, while those in other jurisdictions are more restricted. In the United States and Canada, railroad police are employed by the major Class I railroads, and some smaller ones. In other countries, this work is typically done by territorial police forces rather than specialized agencies. In the United Kingdom, railways fall under the jurisdiction of the British Transport Police. This national transit police force is responsible for policing all railways and some public transit systems in Britain.

== Brazil ==
The Brazilian Federal Railroad Police was created in 1852 by decree of the emperor Dom Pedro II, making it the oldest police agency in Brazil. There are some proposals in the Brazilian Senate to reactivate this police agency, which is considered important to national security.

== Canada ==
Canadian railways, like those in the United States, aided in nation-building and brought new police agencies into existence. Railway constables are given full police powers within 500 meters of property that the railway company owns, possesses or administers. The Canadian Pacific Railway initially relied on the Dominion Police, and later the North-West Mounted Police during construction of the transcontinental railroad, but by the late 1880s, it employed its own police.

The large numbers of navvies recruited to build the railways brought security problems for rail companies. In 1900, the CPR established its Special Service Department. It worked closely with municipal, federal, and provincial police and was mandated to prevent and investigate pilferage, theft, vandalism, sabotage and policing strikes. The CPR Special Service were also responsible for closely guarding Chinese workers, who were considered "detainees" and virtually treated as prisoners under the Chinese Immigration Act of 1885. The Special Service was dissolved in 1904, following a scandal involving the business practices of a CPR Labour Department agent in Montreal. Still, it was resurrected in 1913 as the railway's Department of Investigation.

The Canadian Pacific Police Service, Canadian National Police Service, and VIA Rail Canada Police Service are the only federal railway police services operating in Canada. Police officers for the railways are federally sworn under the Railway Safety Act. This act allows a superior court (federal) judge to appoint a person as a police constable. These officers are employed by the railway and are in place strategically within Canada's rail infrastructure, primarily focusing on reducing deaths and injuries along each railway's network of operations. These officers typically work on investigations involving criminal and provincial violations, such as traffic enforcement and accident investigations, and work to educate the public about the dangers of rail operations and the consequences that can result from complacency.

These police officers are also appointed or sworn provincially to provide additional police powers related to each province's interests. The primary jurisdictional police are still responsible for all law enforcement in their jurisdiction, and due to reduced manpower and coverage, the railway police are considered a secondary response agency. Often, the primary jurisdictional police are required to deal with matters on or concerning railway property. Depending on the seriousness of the incident, railway police may assume jurisdiction. However, their reduced numbers and capabilities may require local police to take control over an incident and act in a supporting role. Railway police also support local police in incidents not related to the railway.

=== Transit police ===
==== Police forces ====
- Metro Vancouver Transit Police
- Canadian Pacific Police Service
- Canadian National Police Service
- Via Rail Police Service

==== Special constables ====
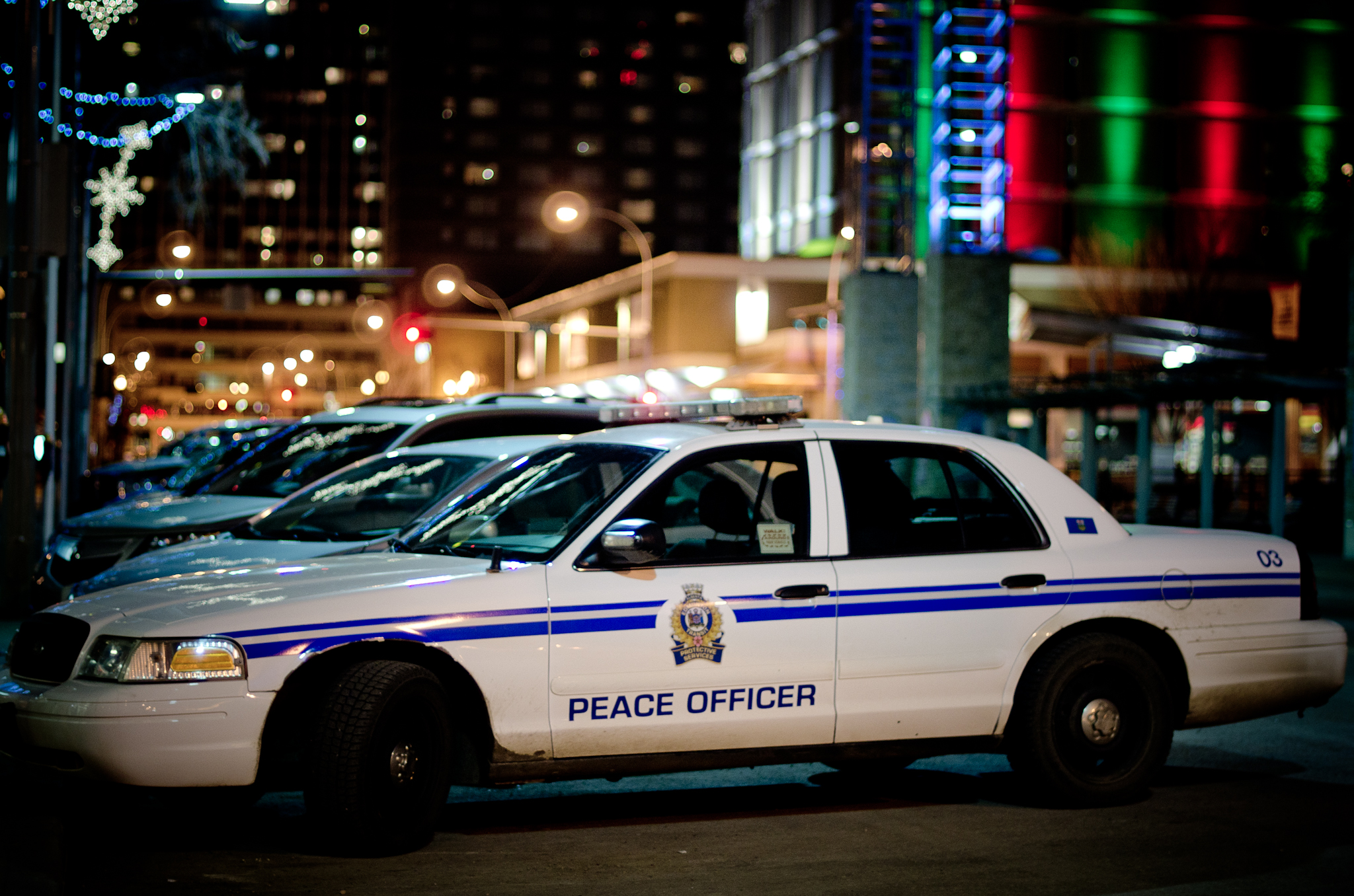
An example from Canada – Edmonton Transit Peace Officer Ford Crown Victoria Police Interceptor

Other large Canadian transit networks use security officers appointed as special constables or peace officers. As special constables, they typically have full police powers when working on transit property to enforce the Criminal Code of Canada, as well as respective bylaws. While they carry some police equipment, such as a protective vest, baton, handcuffs, and pepper spray, they do not carry a firearm. These officers assist local jurisdictions' police officers in investigating illegal activity on the transit system.

- Calgary Transit Public Safety and Enforcement Section
- Edmonton Transit Protective Services
- GO Transit Special Constables
- OC Transpo Special Constable Service
- Société de Transport de Montréal Sûreté des réseaux
- Toronto Transit Commission Transit Enforcement Unit
  - Toronto Police Service also has a Transit Patrol Unit to assist TTC special constables and patrol the network.
- YRT/Viva Special Constable Services

== People's Republic of China ==
The governing body of almost all railroad operations—the Chinese Ministry of Railways, the owner of a great deal of the country's rail network—operated a massive police force that provided security services inside major railroad hubs and stations and outside along the railroads. Their jurisdiction extends to the limit of MoR property. Yet, occasionally the jurisdiction overlaps with local forces, in case it was an offence that occurred inside the MoR facility, or related to MoR operations.

The railroad police of PRC can be considered the only civil police force under the command of an agency of the central government, more precisely, the MoR. Its branches are distributed in parallel to the railway bureaus of MoR, and for some time, it was considered its subsidiary, since the "railway bureau" is an entity of mixed nature: as a government agency and a corporation. Consequently, some railroad police agencies will cover several regions of operation on a provincial level. For example, the division-level Tianjin railroad police force will answer to the prefecture-level Beijing railroad police bureau, even though the regular police force of Tianjin is collateral to its Beijing equivalent. While supervised by the Ministry of Public Security, the force was funded exclusively by MoR itself and was often criticized for protecting corporate interests under MoR. Since it is prevalent in PRC that the local police force was conscripted as a private army of individuals, such criticism reflects the local and central government dispute at some level.

== Germany ==
Bahnschutzpolizei was the railroad police of Nazi Germany. It was tasked with railway safety and preventing espionage and sabotage of railway property. It was not subordinated to the Hauptamt Ordnungspolizei, only the Deutsche Reichsbahn.

Bahnpolizei was the name of the former Railway police of West Germany and fell under the jurisdiction of the Deutsche Bundesbahn federal railway company. Bahnpolizei officers investigated trespassing on rail property, assaults against passengers, terrorism threats targeting the railway, arson, tagging of graffiti on railroad rolling stock or buildings, signal vandalism, pickpocketing, ticket fraud, robbery, and theft of personal belongings, baggage, or freight. They also investigated train/vehicle collisions and hazardous materials releases.

In 1992, the railway security mission was transferred to the Bundesgrenzschutz, which resulted in the merger of the Bahnpolizei into the Federal Border Guard Force. The BGS had already taken on these duties in 1990 for the territory of the former East Germany, replacing the former East German Transportpolizei. The Bundesgrenzschutz was then renamed the Bundespolizei (Federal Police) on July 1, 2005, and this force is currently responsible for security and passenger checks on the German railway system.

== India ==
The protection of Indian Railways is carried out by the Railway Protection Force and the Government Railway Police. The Mission of the Railway Protection Force includes protecting and safeguarding railway passengers, passenger area and railway property and ensuring the safety, security and boosting the confidence of the traveling public in the Indian Railways.

== Indonesia ==
Polsuska (Indonesian: Polisi Khusus Kereta Api or Railroad Special Police) is a law enforcement unit under the auspices of the Indonesian Railway Company. Polsuska, in its role as a special railroad police, is tasked to: apply sanctions in accordance with legislation and implement security, prevention of crime, and prevent non-justice actions within the scope of the Indonesian railways as a partner of the national police. Polsuska is responsible for law and order, including the security of railway stations and train users. Polsuska officers wear black as their uniforms and orange berets pulled to the left. Polsuska is trained by but not part of the Indonesian National Police. Polsuska is under the command of the Indonesian Railway Company's Directorate of Safety and Security.

The Commuter Lines, which serve Greater Jakarta, maintain their own security force, categorized as security guards; their uniforms are light-brown, and they wear orange vests known as (Petugas Keamanan Dalam/PKD). These are not part of Polsuska.

Every railway station in Indonesia also operates several security guards to assist Polsuska in law and order, including security. During peak seasons, such as during the last days of Ramadan and other national holidays, Polsuska may be assisted by members of the military and police to provide additional security presence within the Indonesian Railways.

== Italy ==
Policing of Italian State Railways (Ferrovie dello Stato) is carried out by the Polizia Ferroviaria, a branch of Italy's national police force (Polizia di Stato) operating under the authority of the Minister of the Interior.

== Pakistan ==
Pakistan Railways Police, an agency under the Ministry of Railways, is responsible for guarding trains and passengers in the country.

== Russia ==
The MVD Transport Department protects the rail system in Russia. The police is part of the Ministry of Internal Affairs and is responsible for protecting the railway, checking train quality, and maintaining railway safety in the Russian Federation.

== Switzerland ==
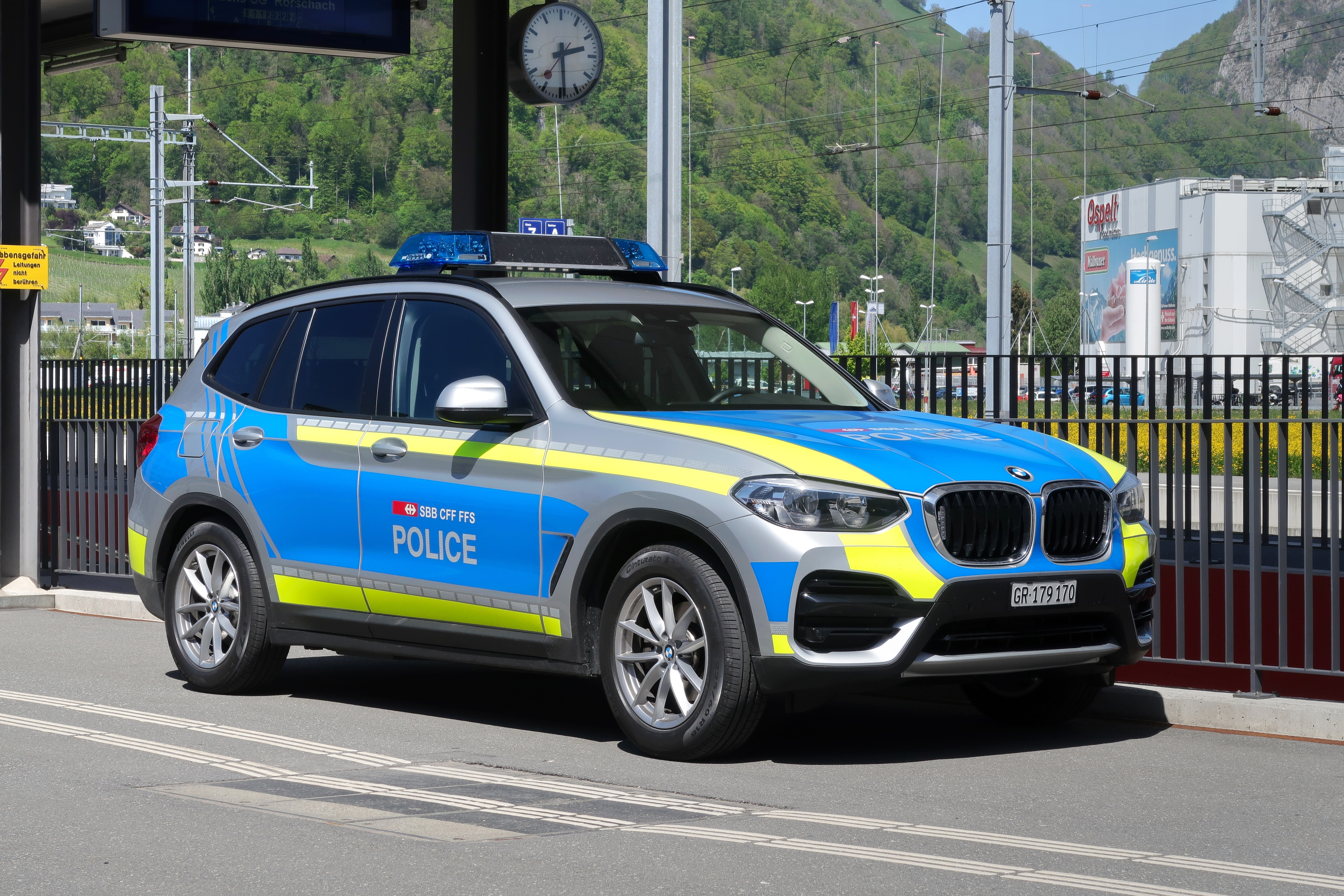
Swiss Railway Police.

Switzerland never had separate transport police because all rail employees had limited police authority. However, in the late 1990s, the introduction of trains with no conductors increased crime in trains, and the Swiss Federal Railways rail company trained Bahnpolizei officers for its driver-only commuter trains.

In 2002 the SBB-CFF-FFS merged its Bahnpolizei force with the private security company Securitas AG, and the resulting Securitrans is now a separate security agency protecting railroad infrastructures.

Since 2011, the rail police have been reorganised, and the Transport Police of Switzerland (Transportpolizei) are state employees, with all officers attending two years of police academy training with final certification.

Transportpolizei officers are sworn as officers of the Swiss Confederation, and thus have the same power of arrest as any other cantonal police officers. Like their state counterparts, they usually carry a SIG Sauer P225 and pepper sprays as weapons, along with handcuffs for restraint options.

== United Kingdom ==
The British Transport Police has protected the rail system in Great Britain since the nationalisation of the railways in 1948. Before this, individual railways had their own police forces.

== United States ==
=== History ===
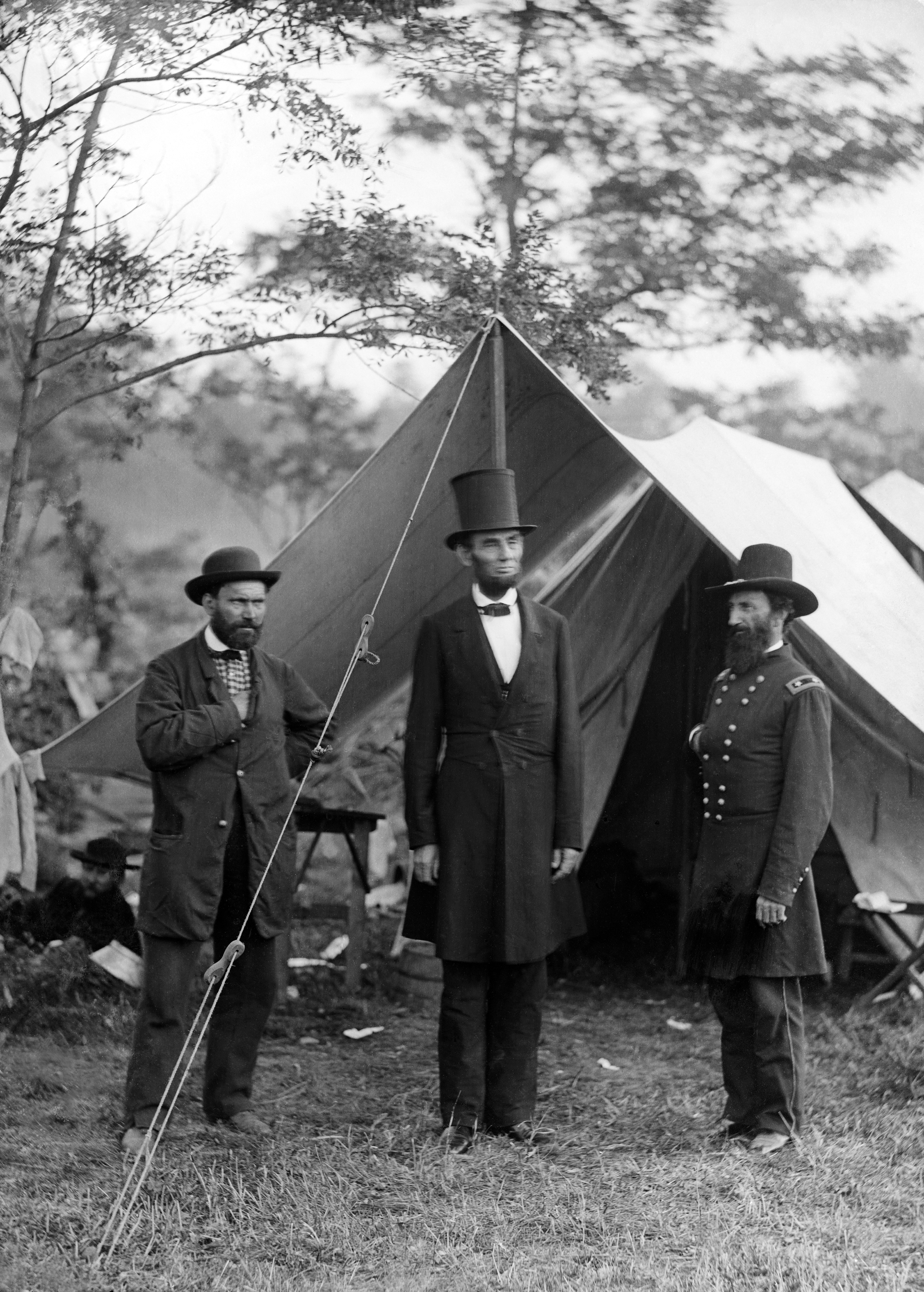
Allan Pinkerton (left) began the first railroad police in the U.S. at the urging of Abraham Lincoln (center) when the future president was a lawyer for the Illinois Central Railroad.

The history of railroad police in the United States traces back to the beginnings of the Pinkerton National Detective Agency. In the mid-nineteenth century, the number of U.S. Marshals was insufficient to police the railway lines sprawling across the vast frontier.

Passing through areas far removed from the protective measures available in populated centers left railroad lines, and passengers and freight vulnerable to banditry. Through his detective business, Allan Pinkerton met George B. McClellan, the president of the Ohio and Mississippi Railroad and Illinois Central Railroad, and its attorney, Abraham Lincoln. With Lincoln's encouragement, Pinkerton began supplying detectives for the railroad.

Railroad contracts were subsequently a mainstay of Pinkerton's until railroad companies gradually developed their own police departments in the years following the Civil War. After founding the Brotherhood of Locomotive Engineers in 1863, Pinkerton's and the new railroad police agencies became instrumental in crushing strikes of rail workers.

Another major concern was employees' pilferage, especially the passenger conductor, who had the greatest authority and freedom on passenger trains and collected ticket fees. Pinkerton began this work for the South Michigan Line in 1854, and on 1 February 1855, he created the North West Police Agency with $10,000 given for the cause by six anxious Midwestern railroads.

=== Jurisdiction and authority ===
Railroad police are certified law enforcement officers responsible for protecting railroad property, cargo, and employees, and they often work in partnership with local, state, and federal law enforcement. However, critics argue that the broad powers of railroad police and a lack of public accountability create significant potential for conflicts of interest.

The appointment, commissioning, and regulation of railroad police under Section 1704 of the U.S. Crime Control Act of 1990, provides that: "A railroad police officer who is certified or commissioned as a police officer under the laws of any one state shall, under the regulations issued by the U.S. Secretary of Transportation, be authorized to enforce the laws of any other state in which the rail carrier owns property."

Section 1704 also states that this police authority is to "the extent of the authority of a police officer certified or commissioned under the laws of that jurisdiction." While railroad police officers may have general police officer authority in some states, such as California, they are limited to the railroad's property in other states.

The status of railroad police officers varies by state, in that they are commissioned by the governor of the state where they reside and/or work, and they may carry both state-level arrest powers and some interstate arrest powers as allowed by 49 USC 28101. Although railroad police primarily enforce laws on or near the railroad right-of-way, their police officers can enforce other laws and make arrests off of railroad property depending on the state in which they are working.

Depending upon the state or jurisdiction, railroad police officers may be considered certified police officers, deputized peace officers, or company special agents. In Virginia, for example, any railroad may apply with the circuit court of any county where it operates to allow the railroad president to appoint members of its own police force.

Some of the crimes railroad police investigate include trespassing on the right-of-way of a railroad, assaults against passengers, terrorism threats targeting the railroad, arson, tagging of graffiti on railroad rolling stock or buildings, signal vandalism, pickpocketing, ticket fraud, robbery, and theft of personal belongings, baggage, or freight. Other incidents railroad police investigate include derailments, train/vehicle collisions, vehicle accidents on the right of way, and hazardous materials releases.

Most railroad police agencies participate in the FBI's Joint Terrorism Task Force.

=== Railroad police agencies ===
==== Private railroad agencies ====
Private railroad police officers are deputized by individual states. For example, in Massachusetts, railroad and ferry company employees may be appointed as special Massachusetts State Police officers with jurisdiction on company property and vehicles. Federal regulations extend the authority granted by one state to a railroad police officer to all the states in which that railroad has property.

Class I:

- BNSF Police Department
- Canadian National Police
- Canadian Pacific Kansas City Police
- CSX Transportation Police Department
- Norfolk Southern Railway Police Department
- Union Pacific Police Department

Class II and III:

- AG Valley Railroad Police (Chicago, Illinois)
- Alaska Railroad Corporation Police Department (Alaska)
- Boston and Maine Railroad Police Department (subsidiary of Pan Am Railways; also covers ex-Maine Central territory owned by PAR) (Massachusetts and Maine)
- Central Valley Union Railroad Police (California)
- Florida East Coast Railway Police (Florida)
- Great Lakes Central Railroad Police (Michigan)
- Indiana Harbor Belt Railroad Police (Indiana)
- Morristown & Erie Railway Police (New Jersey)
- Napa Valley Railroad Police (Napa Valley, California)
- Pacific Harbor Line Railroad Police (California)
- Port Terminal Railroad Association Police (Texas)
- Seminole Gulf Railway Police (Florida)
- R.J. Corman Railroad Police Department (Kentucky)
- Terminal Railroad Association of St. Louis Railroad Police (St. Louis, Missouri)

==== Public rail transit police agencies ====
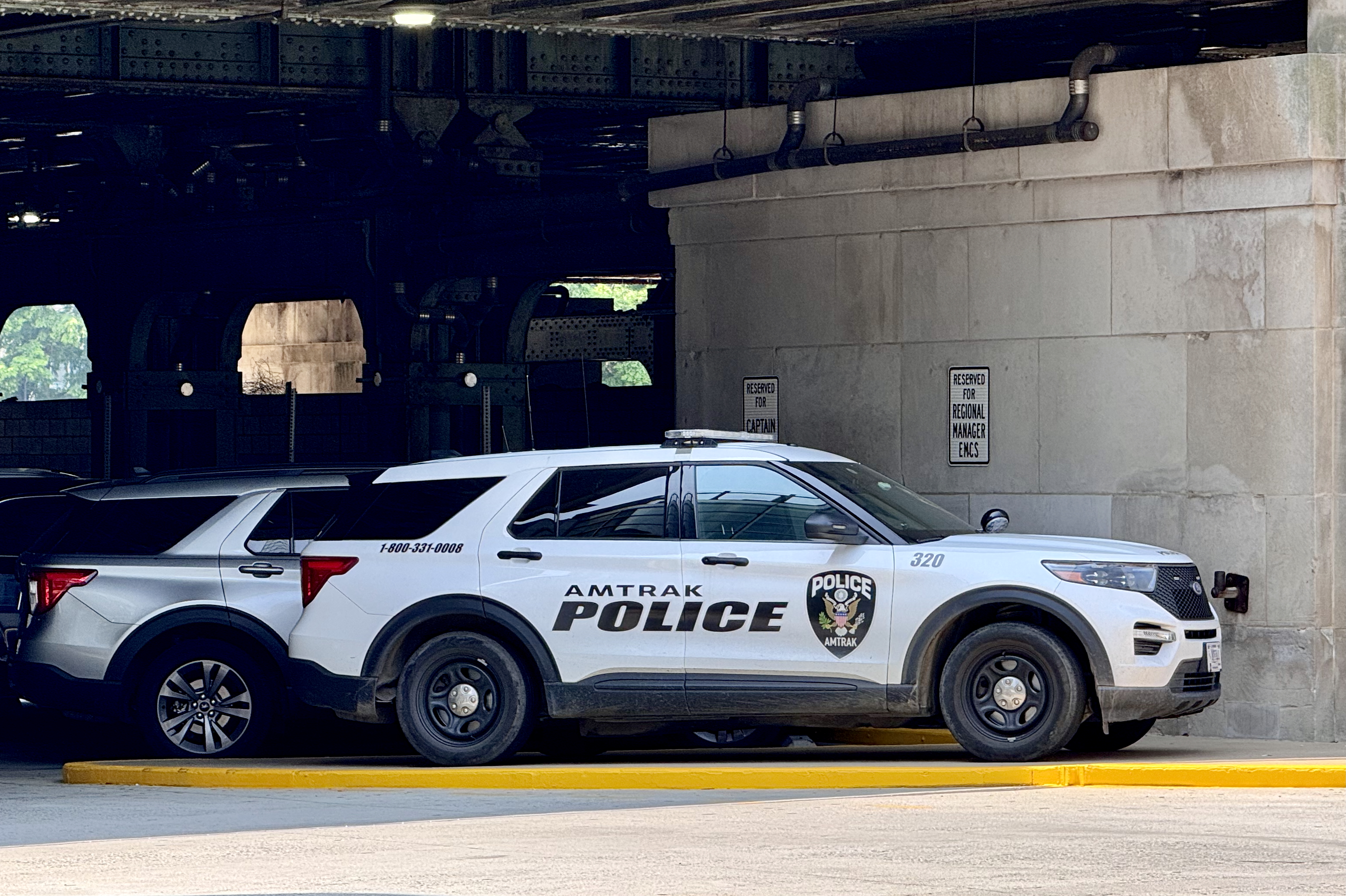
Amtrak Police SUV outside 30th Street Station

The Amtrak Police Department has its own authority under federal law; others listed here are created by state authority (possibly delegated to local governments).

- Amtrak Police Department (nationwide)
- BART Police (San Francisco Bay Area, California)
- DART Transit Police (Dallas–Fort Worth metroplex, Texas)
- Greater Cleveland Regional Transit Authority Police (RTA Police) (Cuyahoga County, Ohio)
- Massachusetts Bay Transportation Authority Police (Massachusetts)
- MARTA Police (Atlanta metropolitan area, Georgia)
- Metra Police Department (Chicago area, Illinois)
- Metro Transit Police Department (Washington, D.C., Maryland, Virginia)
- Metropolitan Transit Police (Minnesota)
- Metropolitan Transportation Authority Police Department (New York State & Connecticut)
- New Jersey Transit Police Department (New Jersey)
- Northern Indiana Commuter Transportation Department Police (NICTD Police) (Indiana)
- Port Authority of New York and New Jersey Police Department (New York & New Jersey) (PATH Rail System)
- RTD Transit Police Department (Denver & Boulder metro areas, Colorado)
- SEPTA Transit Police (Pennsylvania, Delaware, New Jersey)
- Sonoma Marin Area Rail Transit Police, (California) (Chief of Police Only)
- Utah Transit Authority Police Department (Utah)

== Vietnam ==
Department of Traffic Police, part of Ministry of Public Security, includes a Bureau of Instructing and Organizing Safety of Railway. The Bureau protects the railway, checks train quality and maintains railway safety.

== See also ==
- Auxiliary police
- Company police
- Railway Security Guard
- Security police
- Special police
