= Securitas AG =

Swiss company

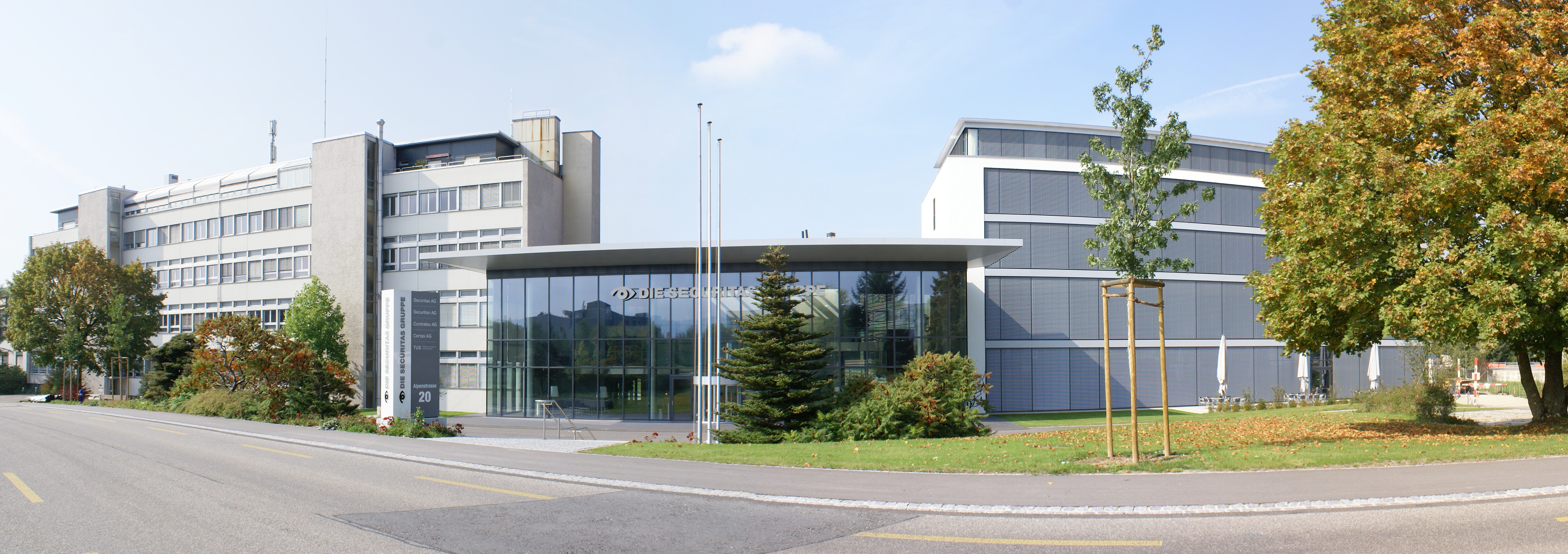
- Company type: Private
- Industry: Security
- Founded: 1907; 119 years ago
- Headquarters: Zollikofen (canton of Bern), Switzerland
- Services: Security services (security guarding and mobile patrolling), monitoring, consulting and investigation

Securitas AG is a Swiss company providing security services with head office in Zollikofen, regional offices in Basel, Bern, Geneva, Lausanne, Lugano, Lucerne, Neuchâtel, Olten, St. Gallen, Thun and Zürich as well as 25 other branches all over Switzerland.

Securitas AG is part of the Swiss Securitas Group.

== Services ==
- Area patrols
- Bodyguards
- Building-site guarding
- Event security
- Holiday guarding
- Individual patrols
- Intervention and control center services
- Law enforcement
- Object and valuables protection
- Prisoner transports
- Traffic services

== History ==
=== From Foundation to World War I ===
Based on the insolvent company of the same name, Bernese Advocate and Colonel Jakob Spreng founded Securitas AG in 1907. One of the customers was the Swiss Federal Railways with a guarding contract for railway stations in Swiss cities. This was followed by public occasions such as the "Eidgenössisches Schützenfest", a Federal shooting match, in Bern in 1910, where Securitas formed a detachment with the local fire-brigade and police forces.

With the Schweizerische Landesausstellung, the Swiss National Exhibition in 1914 in Bern, the company was awarded a contract: 200 guards provide area surveillance and access control. Despite the outbreak of World War I, with its loss of manpower due to general conscription, Securitas AG was established throughout Switzerland by this time. In the years 1917 and 1919, contracts with the organisers of the Swiss trade fair in Basel and the Comptoir in Lausanne followed. These institutions remain regular customers. On. November 27, 1917, Jakob Spreng died age 54, and his successor Alfred Geiser took over as General Manager.

In 1919, the company was tasked with security of Swiss food deliveries to war-damaged eastern states.

In 1907, an accident insurance was introduced. From 1918, health insurance as well as widow's and orphan's pension followed. In 1925, a staff pension fund was established, and in 1934 all employees entered the unemployment insurance scheme.

=== The 1930s ===
In 1928, Jakob Spreng junior took over from Alfred Geiser as General Manager of Securitas AG. The newly founded League of Nations employed Securitas AG as security service in its headquarters, the Palais des Nations in Geneva, where the guards protected delegates, showed visitors around, monitored entrances and inspected journalists.

=== From World War II to the 1950s ===
In 1939, guarding contracts followed at the ice hockey world championships in Zürich and Basel as well as the National Exhibition in Zürich. The outbreak of World War II demanded flexibility: due to the rising counts of break-ins and thefts during the black-out, patrol areas saw a rise in staff and patrol frequencies were heightened. To bypass staff shortages due to general conscription, the guards' wives took over their husbands' nightly rounds. During the so-called "Anbauschlacht" or "cultivation battle" to ensure the nation's food supplies, the company was assigned a plot of land above Cademario in Ticino, where potatoes were cultivated.

In 1943, the first collective labour agreement was conceived between the trade-union VHTL and Securitas AG. That same year, an internal compensation fund was established, which paid child benefits until they were established by law.

In 1948, the affiliate Securiton AG was founded.

During the soccer World Championships in 1954, Securitas was present in large numbers along with military and police forces. Even at the so-called "Miracle of Bern", where Germany became world champion against its adversary Hungary, Securitas guards were on duty at the press center and other special access points.

On November 18, 1958, Jakob Spreng junior died at age 65 and his son Manuel Spreng became General Manager.

In 1959, the first actual service car, a Citroen, was purchased. During the 1950s, the nationwide distribution of security systems demanded more and more on-site interventions.

=== From 1960 to 2000 ===
In 1963, Securitas Express AG was founded, which specialized in money and valuables transports. In 1964, the National Exhibition EXPO in Lausanne took place, where 300 male and, as a milestone in company history, also female employees provided security services.

In the 1960s, Swiss Federal councillor Moritz Leuenberger temporarily worked as a Securitas guard.

In addition to a busy Bee Gees concert in February 1968, the Interessengemeinschaft Telekommunikation und Systeme TUS was founded.

Based on the telecommunications system TUS35, Securitas established the first control center in Basel in 1969. This control center allowed numerous signals to be received differentiated and to be forwarded to the appropriate stations.

At the Rolling Stones concert in Bern in 1972, Securitas guards around the stage and at the emergency exits were wearing specially-made T-shirts, because the organisers wished no uniformed guards inside the concert hall. That same year, the business division money and valuables transports were sold to the internationally established MAT Transport AG. Although Securitas still offers escort duties, the company has ceased doing money and valuables transports.

For security and efficiency reasons, the management decided to create a private radio network in 1977. Two years later, Securitas owned the largest private radio network in Europe at the time.

The 1980s were characterized by official visits like the Queen Elizabeth II of Britain or the Pope John Paul II. Further, personal and object security specialists became responsible for all security measures concerning the Swiss embassy in the Lebanese capital Beirut. In 1989, one of the guard's main tools, the control watch, was replaced by an electronic reading device, which allowed for much easier data analysis.

In 1991, the Securitas uniform was refurbished: Along with new colours and cuts for uniform jacket and service pant or service skirt, the kepi was replaced by beret and combination cap.

During the 1990s, Securitas AG was certified by quality management norm ISO 9001 and introduced an intern diploma in 1993, which acted as a model for the Federal diploma for security specialists.

In 1996, Samuel Spreng was appointed as General Manager by the board of directors and took over the operational leadership of the Securitas Group on January 1, 1997. His brother Manuel presided the board of directors until his demise on February 9, 1999.

=== The 21st century ===
At the 6th Swiss National Exhibition Expo.02 in 2002, Securitas not only took part by means of services, but as an official partner and sponsor. In that year the uniforms as well as the corporate identity of the company were refurbished and modernized.

In 2003, according to Swiss public television, Securitas sent an agent to spy on the activist organization ATTAC on behalf of Nestlé, one of the largest multinationals in Switzerland. This went on for more than a year. A criminal case was dropped in 2009, but Securitas and Nestlé liable in a civil case in 2013 and ordered both to pay compensation to the activists.

In 2007, Securitas AG celebrated its centenary.
