= Law enforcement agency powers =

Powers of police forces

A law enforcement agency (LEA) has powers, which other government subjects do not, to enable the LEA to undertake its responsibilities. These powers are generally in one of six forms:

- Exemptions from laws
- Intrusive powers, for search, seizure, and interception
- Legal deception
- Use of force and constraint of liberty
- Jurisdictional override
- Direction

The types of powers and law exemptions available to a LEA vary from country to country.

They depend on the social, legal, and technical maturity of the country, and on the resources available to LEAs generally in the country. Some countries may have no laws regarding a particular type of activity by its subjects at all, while other countries might have very stringent laws on the same type of activity. This will impact significantly on the legal structures, if any, that govern how an LEA can operate, and on how the LEA's use of powers is overviewed.

Law enforcement agency powers are part of a broad range of techniques used for law enforcement, many of which require no specific legislative support or independent overview.

See law enforcement techniques for a list of other law enforcement techniques.

== Overview of use of powers ==
The powers and law exemptions granted to an LEA allow the LEA to act in a way which would typically be regarded as violating the rights of law complying subjects. Accordingly, to minimise the risk that these powers and law exemptions might be misused or abused, many countries have in place strong overview regimes to monitor the use and application of the LEA's powers and law exemptions. Overview regimes can involve judicial officers, be provided by internal audit services, by independent authorities, by the LEA's governing body, or some other civil mechanism.

Generally, the use of powers and law exemptions fall into two loose categories:

- those that are deemed to be intrusive and might significantly impact the rights of a subject
- those that are relatively unintrusive and do not significantly impact the rights of a subject.

While a LEA's powers and law exemptions are not usually explicitly categorised in this way, they do fall into these two broad categories in this manner and can be identified by the types and level of overview applied to the use of the powers and law exemptions. The former group can have strong and multiple levels of overview, typically for every exercising of the power or law exemption, and the latter group can have no overview other than an exceptional response for some extreme malutilisation of the power or law exemption.

Due to their nature, specifically allocated powers have a greater impact on subjects, whereas law exemptions have a lesser impact on subjects. For example, the use of deadly force is normally an explicitly granted power. This is distinct from the carrying of a firearm in a public place. The latter is normally a law exemption. The discharging of a firearm is normally subject to significant overview, whether or not person injury or property damage occurred, whereas the carrying of a firearm in compliance with the law exemption requires no reporting or overview.

=== Approval and internal overview ===
Typically personnel of an LEA cannot just exercise a power of their own volition. In order to exercise a power, an officer of an LEA must argue for and get approval, from either a senior officer of the LEA or a judicial officer. The senior officer or the judicial officer have a responsibility to ensure that use of a power is necessary and does not unnecessarily violate the rights of subjects.

=== Judicial overview ===
Judicial overview of LEA powers is typically in the form of the LEA having to provide grounds for the exercising of the power to a judicial officer in order to get approval, each time the power is to be exercised. Typically, in line with the separation of authority, the judicial officer is external to the LEA. Judicial overview is typically required for the more intrusive powers. The judicial approval for the use of a power is usually called a warrant, for example, a search warrant for the intrusive search and seizure of a subject's property, or a telecommunications interception warrant to listen to and copy subjects' communications:)

=== Civil and external overview ===
Civil overview can be applied to internally approved use of powers and also to judicial approval of powers. Civil overview is normally after the event reporting on the frequency and effectiveness of the use of the powers to open fora accessible to the public.

External overview can be done by auditors, or specifically created general overview authorities, for example ombudsmen. The reports, or at least summaries of the reports, of these entities on the LEA's use of powers or law exemptions is typically available to the public. For example, the Australian Federal Police's controlled operations are subject to open civil review by its governing body, the Parliament of Australia.

=== Internal review ===
Internal review involves formal reviews done by the LEA itself on the use of its powers and law exemptions. Often, as part of this process, every time a certain power is used an incident report detailing the circumstances requiring the use of the power and the outcomes of the use of the power must be completed. For example, a use of force report. These reports are then collated and analysed to determine if there are any patterns of misuse, overuse, or process change or LEA personnel training requirements required.

=== Abuse of powers and law exemptions ===
The abuse, or perceived abuse, or lack of openness and reporting on the use, of powers and law exemptions by an LEA, can give rise to lack of confidence and respect by subjects in the LEA. Where there is abuse of its powers and law exemptions by an LEA, and no or ineffective overview of its activities, the LEA can come to be referred to as a secret police agency.

== Communications interception ==
The interception of communications is usually the interception of electronic voice or data connections, and is typically called telecommunications interception (TI). In some countries TI is called wire tapping. Other forms of communications interception can be intercepting radio transmissions and opening physical mail items.

In a civil society or democratic society, governing bodies give their law enforcement agencies specific powers to intercept telecommunications via specific laws, for example, in Australia with the Telecommunications (Interception and Access) Act 1979, in the United Kingdom via the Regulation of Investigatory Powers Act 2000, and in the United States with 18 USC §2516.

The use of TI powers by a LEA is typically subject to strong overview from outside of the LEA. For example, in Australia an ombudsman has strong intrusive powers to monitor and review an LEA using TI.

== Intrusive seizure ==
Intrusive seizure can include:

- Property seizure by entering premises
- Taking from a subject finger prints, palm prints, sole prints, teeth impressions, lip prints, blood samples, DNA samples, etc.
- Information seizure by accessing information systems

=== Property seizure by entering premises ===
Law enforcement agencies are specifically given the authority to seize property, for the example the Federal Bureau of Investigation The power to search and seize property is typically granted in an instance via an instrument called a search warrant.

== Legal deception ==
Legal deception powers can include:

- Assumed identities
- Controlled operations
- Intrusive surveillance

=== Assumed identities ===
Law enforcement agency personnel when they take on assumed identities are often referred to as covert officers or undercover officers. The use of such methods in open societies are typically explicitly authorised and is subject to overview, for example in Australia under the Crimes Act 1914, and in the United Kingdom under the Regulation of Investigatory Powers Act 2000.

=== Controlled operations ===
Controlled operations, an action by a law enforcement agency to allow a criminal act to occur, for example the importation of illicit substances, so that as many of the subjects involved in the act can be identified as possible during the process of importation. A controlled operation typically includes the substitution of all of the illicit substances, or the significant majority of them, by the law enforcement agency with similar looking but benign materials.

In open societies, controlled operations are specifically legislated for to be used by law enforcement agencies and are subject to overview, for example in Australia.

=== Intrusive surveillance ===
Intrusive surveillance typically means entering or interfering with the private and confidential space and property of a subject. Intrusive surveillance typically requires the law enforcement agency to be enabled for a law enforcement agency, for example in Australia, and in the United Kingdom. Recent advances in technology have made surveillance easier to achieve and, in some instance, even commonplace.

== Use of force ==
Use of force powers can include:

- Non-lethal force, including either non-lethal weapons or temporary physical holds and contact to immobilize subjects
- Lethal force
- Immobilisation and restraint

== Constraint of liberty ==
Constraint of liberty powers can include:

- Arrest. The power to arrest is typically granted in an instance via an instrument called an arrest warrant. The power to arrest is also typically granted to a member of an LEA for whenever the member has probable cause to do so. Open governments publicly give their law enforcement agencies the power to arrest subjects, for example, in the United States, the FBI has the power of arrest under 18 USC §3052.
- Detention

== Jurisdictional override ==
Sometimes, a law enforcement agency will not normally have the jurisdictional authority to be involved in enforcing compliance of, or investigating the non compliance with, a law unless that law or the non complying subject crosses over multiple jurisdictions, or the non compliance is especially severe.

For example, in the United States while kidnapping is typically initially a state jurisdictional matter, the United States' Federal Bureau of Investigation is allowed to take responsibility when the matter crosses state boundaries by virtue of the act(s) then becoming a federal matter.

== Direction ==
The power of direction allows a LEA to direct a subject to either carry out some act or provide information with the subject having no right to refuse, even if the outcome is to incriminate the subject, that is, any explicit, implied, or de facto right to silence is overridden.

This power when provided to an LEA in a civil society or democratic society is typically counterbalanced by the subject not being able to be prosecuted as a result of them complying with the direction, but they can be prosecuted if they do not comply. They can be prosecuted if other law enforcement outcomes have the otherwise same effect. A subject can be prosecuted using information obtained from another subject under direction.

An example of this power of direction is held by the Australian Crime Commission. The Australian Federal Police (AFP) also has a power of direction, but this is limited to being applied to AFP appointees.

== See also ==
- Photography is Not a Crime
- Police stop, search, detention and arrest powers in the United Kingdom
- Proactive policing
- Law enforcement in the United States
- Federal law enforcement in the United States
