= Company police =

Private police working for companies

Company police are a form of private police and are law enforcement officers (LEOs) that work for companies rather than governmental entities; they may be employed directly by a private corporation or by a private security company which contracts private policing services out to other entities (including to private, non-private, and governmental entities). Company and private police generally provide security police services for their employer's or clients' properties. Company police generally refers to a law enforcement entity controlled specifically by a company, whereas private police generally refers to any law enforcement entity that is privately controlled (including company police), such as the campus police of a private college or university. The authority accorded to company and private police LEOs still flows from a governmental entity (such as via state or municipal statutes) and such private LEOs are often still subject to state or municipal law enforcement regulatory bodies.

== Indonesia ==
In Indonesia, company and state-enterprise security personnel regulated by the Indonesian National Police include Satpam (Satuan Pengamanan, private security guards) and Polsus (Kepolisian Khusus, special police units serving in state-owned enterprises and agencies, such as Polsuska for Kereta Api Indonesia and Polhut for forestry concessions).

== Malaysia ==
In Malaysia, auxiliary police refers to sworn security police officers serving in autonomous government agencies and key government-linked companies/entities such as Northport (Malaysia) Bhd (Northport), Petroleum Nasional Berhad (Petronas), the Malaysian Federal Reserve Bank (Bank Negara), the National Anti-Drugs Agency (Agensi Anti-Dadah Kebangsaan - AADK), the Federal Land Development Agency (FELDA) and the Inland Revenue Board (Lembaga Hasil Dalam Negeri); and other institutions with semi-governmental interests. Such institutions include the National Savings Bank (Bank Simpanan Nasional - BSN), Malayan Railways Limited (Keretapi Tanah Melayu Berhad - KTMB), Pos Malaysia Holdings Berhad (the national postal service), Malaysia Airports Holdings Berhad (the largest Malaysian airport operator), the North-South Highway Project (Projek Lebuhraya Utara Selatan - PLUS), Tenaga Nasional Berhad (the national power service), and other similar strategic organizations.

Most of these organizations have already been privatized, but are allowed to maintain an auxiliary police unit. Under special circumstances, auxiliary police units have also been established by private companies with no government interests at all, such as the force maintained by Resorts World Berhad (RWB), which operates the popular resort and casino at Genting Highlands. At present, there are 153 government agencies, statutory bodies, and private companies authorized to operate their own auxiliary police units, with a total strength of 40,610 personnel.

== Singapore ==
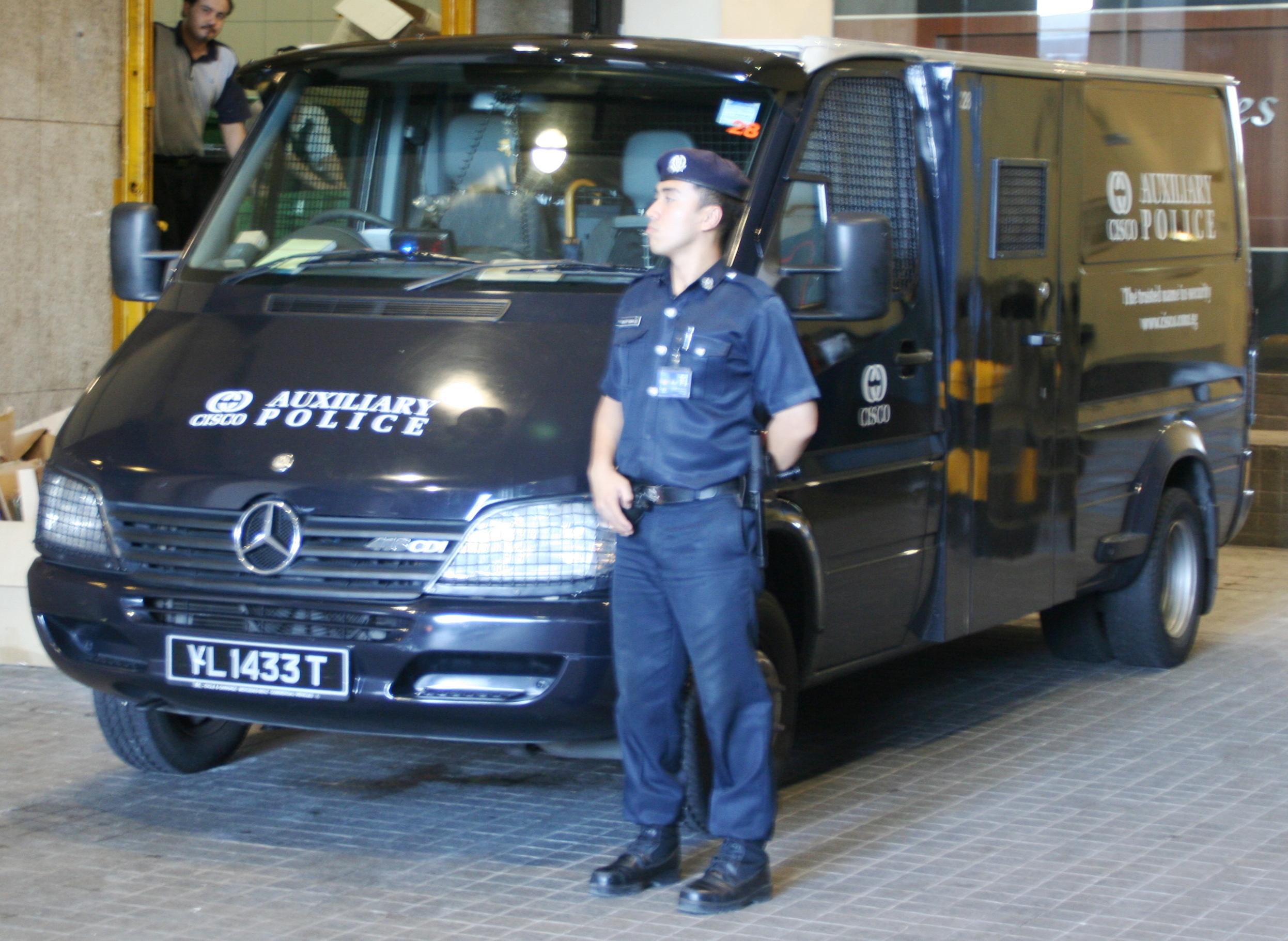
A Certis CISCO auxiliary police officer stands guard beside an armoured truck at Change Alley, Singapore.

In Singapore, auxiliary police officers (APOs) are security police appointed under the Police Force Act 2004 (24 of 2004), 2004, s 92(1)–(2), are vested with all the power, protection and immunities of a Police Officer of corresponding rank, and are licensed to carry firearms when carrying out their duties. These armed APOs are full-time paid employees of their respective companies, and are not directly affiliated to the Singapore Police Force. They are appointed as APOs only after attending and passing a residential course, the curriculum of which is set by the Security Industry Regulatory Department of the Singapore Police Force. Each APO is issued with a warrant card signed by the Commissioner of Police of the Singapore Police Force.

== United Kingdom ==
The term was formerly used in the United Kingdom for in-house security guards at factories and plants. Despite the name, these men did not have police powers. It has been illegal for police officers to work part-time as security guards in the United Kingdom since 1934.

There are ten companies whose employees are sworn in as constables under section 79 of the Harbours, Docks, and Piers Clauses Act 1847. As a result, they have the full powers of a constable on any land owned by the harbour, dock, or port and at any place within one mile of any owned land. Additionally, there are also some forces established by specific legislation such as the Port of Tilbury Police (Port of London Act 1968).

== United States ==
Company police exist in some states in the United States. Their powers, jurisdiction, and training standards vary from state to state.

In the majority of the states in the U.S., actively employed state-certified peace officers, regardless of the capacity in which they are employed (private, public, company, security, campus, etc.), have the ability to pursue and apprehend someone suspected of committing a criminal or violation offense or a felony while on employer or contracted property outside of their normal jurisdiction. They can also detain or make a citizen's arrest if off employer's property or contract sites, then turn the detained violator over to local law enforcement authorities.

There are generally three types of company police:

- "in-house" or "proprietary" (i.e. employed by the same company or organization they protect, such as a mall, theme park, property owners association, or casino);
- "contract", working for a private security company which protects many locations and/or multiple businesses;
- "governmental", working for a special governmental agency: public hospital, public park, school district, museum, fairground, etc.

=== North Carolina ===
North Carolina founded its company police program in the late 1800s to give textile mills and employee villages (housing and company store, offices, etc.) internal police protection, and the powers of company police authority apply within their jurisdiction unless in "continuous and immediate" pursuit. Currently, governmental facilities, factories, schools, mill towns, hotels, condominium units, and private or gated communities that have proprietary or contracted special police have jurisdiction over property in which the employer has ownership or control, to make arrests for both felonies and misdemeanors and to charge for infractions.

North Carolina requires company police to meet and maintain state standards set forth for all state sworn law enforcement officers (including Basic Law Enforcement Training, background checks, medical and psychological evaluations, and firearms qualification) and additionally pass a state-administered written exam specific to company police. These law enforcement officers and their respective agencies are regulated by the Company Police Administrator through the North Carolina Department of Justice. Under the Company Police Act (N.C.G.S. Chapter 74E), the three categories of company police are:

- Campus Police Officers – Company police officers employed by a constituent institution of the University of North Carolina or a private college or university licensed or exempted from licensure under G.S. 116-15, and employed by a campus police agency licensed prior to the enactment of Chapter 74G of the General Statutes.
- Railroad Police Officers – Company police officers employed by a certified rail carrier and commissioned as company police officers under Chapter 74E.
- Special Police Officers – All company police officers not designated as a campus police officer or railroad police officer.

=== Pennsylvania ===
Historically, private coal and steel companies in Pennsylvania employed the Coal and Iron Police, which operated from 1866 until 1931.

=== Virginia ===
The Commonwealth of Virginia has a statutory designation of "special conservator of the peace" (SCOP). These officers have police powers through private employers on public and contract property and may carry firearms. The training is over 100 hours for armed SCOPs and 24 for unarmed. The officers must go through the Virginia Department of Criminal Justice Services, pass a background investigation, drug screen, proof of liability insurance, fingerprints, fees, and successful completion of all training, and then be issued a commission designating boundaries of jurisdiction specified by a judge in order to be commissioned.

=== Washington, D.C. ===
Washington, D.C. has special police officer (SPO) commissions for security guards who may need to make minor arrests and they must complete a brief training course. SPOs oftentimes work for private corporations within Washington, D.C., fulfilling the role of company police within the district.

The jurisdiction of SPOs are sometimes limited to the property which they have been hired to protect, however many SPOs work in a part-time capacity to supplement the salaries they earn as full-time city police or county officers. This inherently grants them citywide or county-wide jurisdiction if the property they are employed on is located within the respective jurisdiction of their full-time public service police department.
