= Canadian Pacific Kansas City Police Service =

Private railroad police force

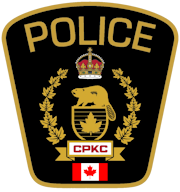
- Canadian Pacific Kansas City Railway Police (Canadian Shoulder Flash; Mock, not official)

- Fmr. crest of the Canadian Pacific Railway Police Service

- Fmr. Canadian Pacific Railway Police (US Shoulder Flash)
- Common name: CPKC Police Service
- Abbreviation: CPKCPS

Agency overview
- Formed: 1913 (as Department of Investigations)
- Preceding agency: CPR Special Services Department

Jurisdictional structure
- International agency: Canada, United States, Mexico
- Countries: 3: Canada; United States; Mexico
- Operations jurisdiction: Canada, United States, Mexico
- General nature: Civilian police
- Specialist jurisdiction: Railways, tramways, rail transit systems

Operational structure
- Agency executives: Al Sauve, Chief of Police; Kelly Clough, Chief of Police - United States Operations
- Parent agency: Canadian Pacific Kansas City

Website
- CPKC Police Service Website

The Canadian Pacific Kansas City Police Service (CPKC Police Service), formerly known as Canadian Pacific Police Service (CPPS) until 2023, is a railway police service responsible for providing police services on, around, and in relation to Canadian Pacific Kansas City property and rail lines in Canada and the United States.

== History ==
The Canadian Pacific Kansas City Police Service is one of the oldest police services in Canada. CPKC Police Service, formerly Canadian Pacific Police Service and CP Railway Police, have a long and storied past within Canada and CP Rail is a part of Canada's history. Railway police were called upon many times to police railway towns, and to keep the peace during the building of the Canadian Railways from coast to coast. The railway police history dates many years and continues the tradition of protecting Canada's vast section of railway.

Years ago, the CPKC Police provided police services to union station buildings, CP Hotels, CP Ships and CP Air. CPR is now their main responsibility, as the above CP departments have been sold.

=== Conflict of interest controversy ===
In 2019, the Canadian Pacific Police Service was criticized by its own officers for having a conflict of interest and failing to properly investigate a CP train crash near Field, British Columbia that resulted in three deaths. The incident called into question the role of private police forces.

== Organization ==
=== Authority ===
Canadian Pacific Kansas City Police Service are responsible for all aspects of railway security. They are duly appointed and armed federal police officers that gather their authority in Canada via the Railway Safety Act as well as other acts.

The Railway Safety Act is a federal act that allows for any federal railway to appoint officers as police constables. These police constables have all the powers of a regular police officer as it relates to the protection of property owned, possessed or administered by a railway company and the protection of persons and property on that property. Railway police are unique in Canada as they are the only sworn peace officers employed by a privately owned law enforcement agency. CPKCPS are "a fully authorized federal force, bound to uphold Canada's laws" and licensed to carry arms.

The main duties of a railway police officer are to protect the public using the company facilities, the employees and its assets. This includes public education on trespassing, school awareness programs, investigating crimes against the railway, assist the local police services, issuing tickets and many other duties including security of property and buildings. CPKC Rail assigns individual officers large sections of railway tracks to patrol and conduct active enforcement and public safety initiatives.

== Operations ==
The police service is led by two separate chiefs - one for the Canadian operation, and the other for the American operation.

All CPKC Police officers must have knowledge of federal and provincial laws as the railway properties cross many jurisdictions (federal, provincial, municipal, county) and have to collaborate with their respective police departments. The job of a railway police officer is sometimes lonely, patrolling miles of track alone, with little back-up. They are paid on par with regular police officers in Canada and receive similar benefits. CP Rail is a private company and pays taxes that includes public police protection, thus CPR has downsized their police department over several decades. CPKC Police numbers have remained steady at about 100 officers in the United States and Canada. Jurisdictional public police departments maintain the overall responsibility for public safety and law enforcement in their respective territories including CPR property. CPKC Police will assist local police if necessary, and conduct its own investigations. CPR also uses its police department to conduct investigations into employee conduct dealing with collective agreement violations involving alcohol and drugs, as well as criminal matters.

=== Training ===
CPKC Police recruits attend different federal and provincial police academies as there is no government-mandated training college for railway police in Canada. Currently, CPKC Police have an agreement with the Lethbridge Police Service and the Lethbridge College in Alberta to provide recruit training to new officers. In 2010, CP Police used the Saskatchewan Municipal Police College (SKPC) to train recruits. The SKPC also offers continuing education and specialized courses to experienced members. Before 2010, CP Police recruits used to get their basic training at the RCMP Academy at Depot in Regina, Saskatchewan. For specialized police training, members may attend different provincial police colleges, as well as the Canadian Police College in Ottawa.

== Equipment ==
The CPKC uniform consists of a dark blue shirt, dark blue cargo pants with body armour; they are armed with the usual police use-of-force equipment, as well as a Glock 9mm pistol, Remington 870 shotgun and SIG Sauer M400 patrol rifle. They are issued a standard police-style forage cap. In addition, CPKC police sometimes work in a plain-clothes capacity.

=== Fleet ===
Current:

- Ford Police Interceptor Utility Vehicle

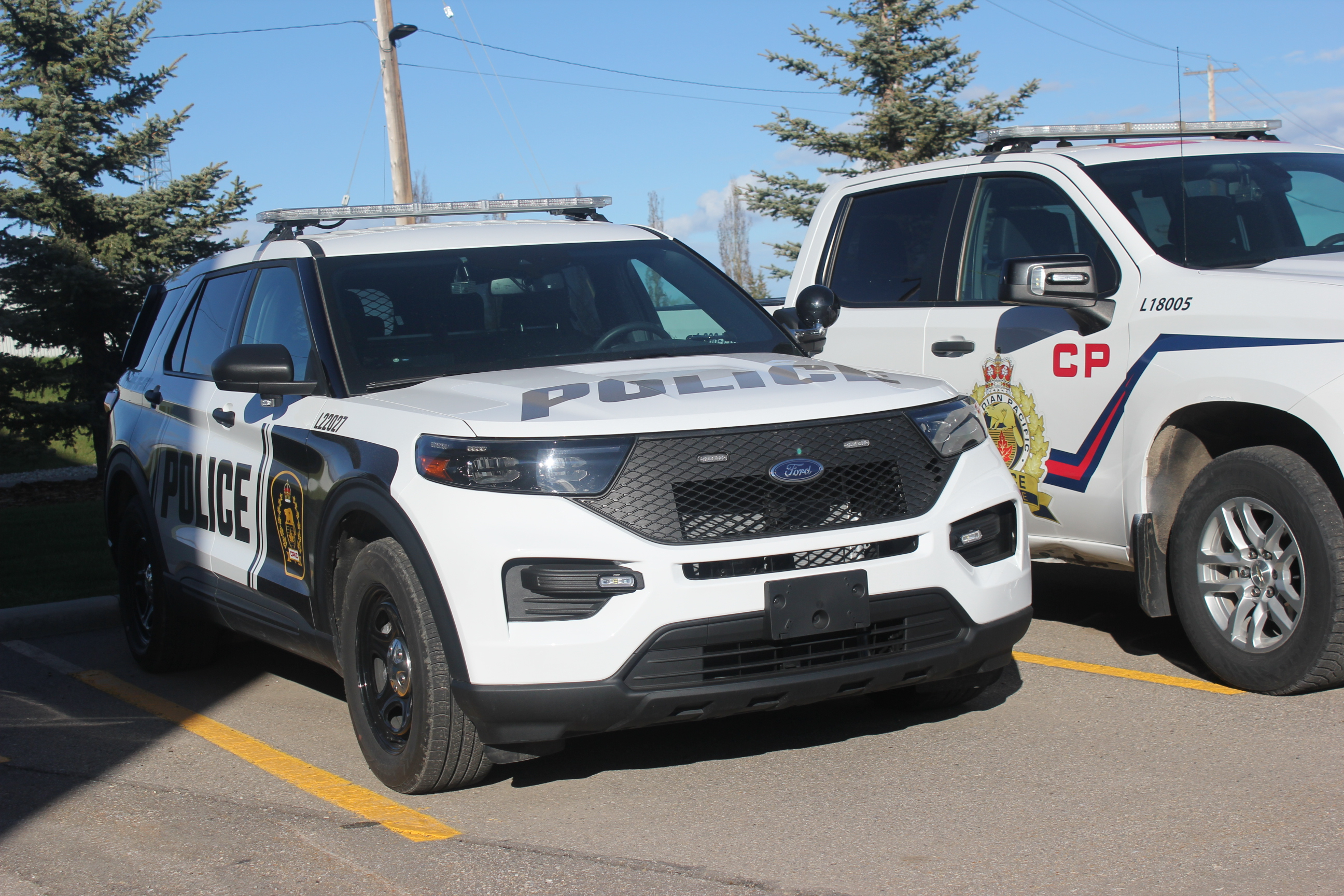
A new CPKC Ford Police Interceptor Utility, Calgary, 2024

- 2009-2012 Ford Explorer
- Ram pickup 4 X 4
- Ford F-150 4 X 4
- Chevrolet Silverado

Former:

- Ford Crown Victoria
- 2009-2014 Ford F-150 4 X 4
- Dodge Magnum
- 1997-2011 Dodge Dakota

== See also ==
- Canadian National Police Service
- Railroad police
