= Transit police =

Law enforcement personnel employed by a transit agency

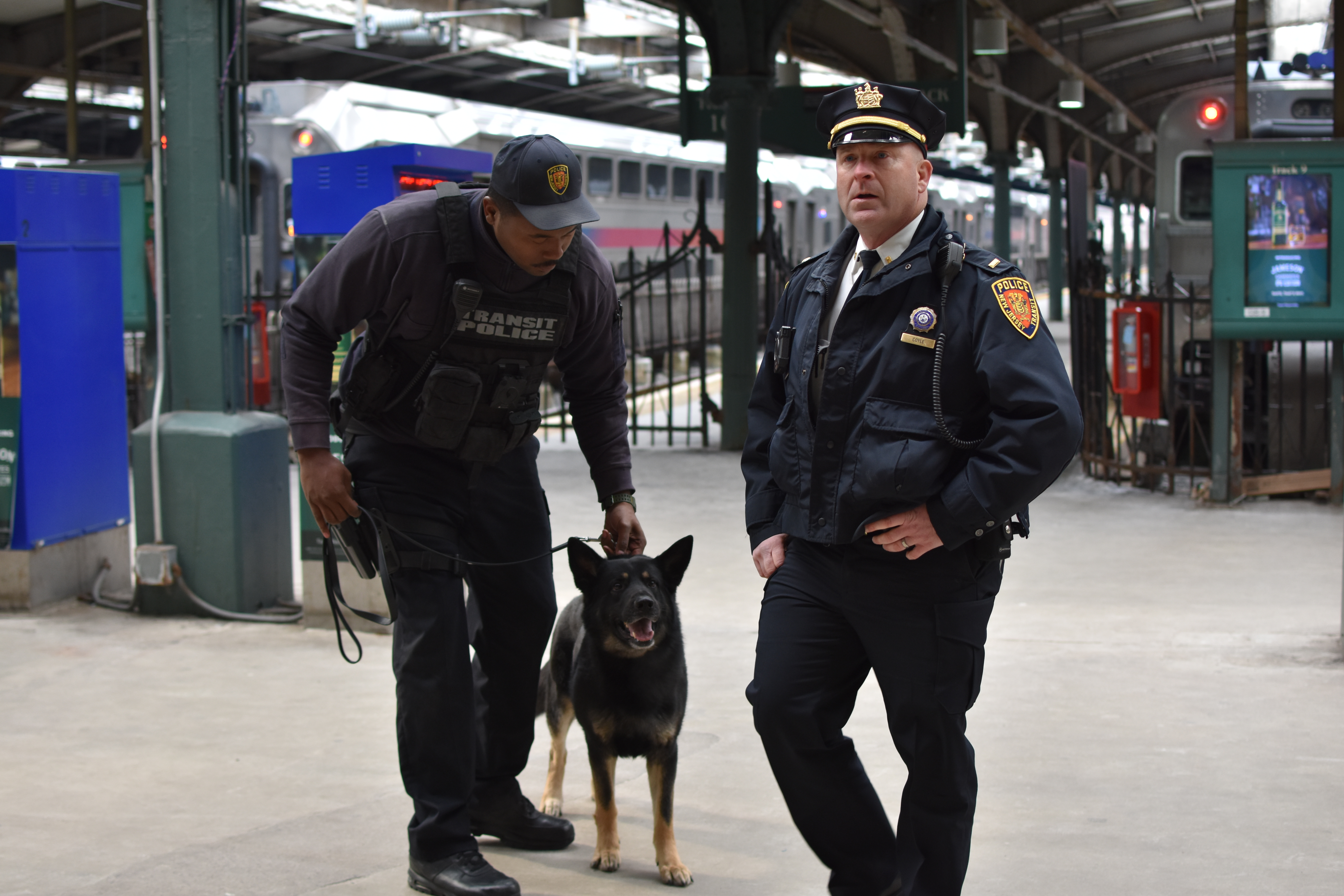
New Jersey Transit Police Department officers at Hoboken Terminal in Hoboken, New Jersey

Transit police (also known as transport police, railway police, railroad police and several other terms) are specialized police agencies employed either by a common carrier, such as a transit district, railway, railroad, bus line, or another mass transit provider or municipality, county, district, or state.

Transit law enforcement services may also be provided by a specialized unit within a larger local law enforcement agency. Their mandate is generally to prevent and investigate all crime committed against the carrier or its passengers and crime incidentally committed on or around the carrier's property.

== Type ==
=== Autonomous agencies ===
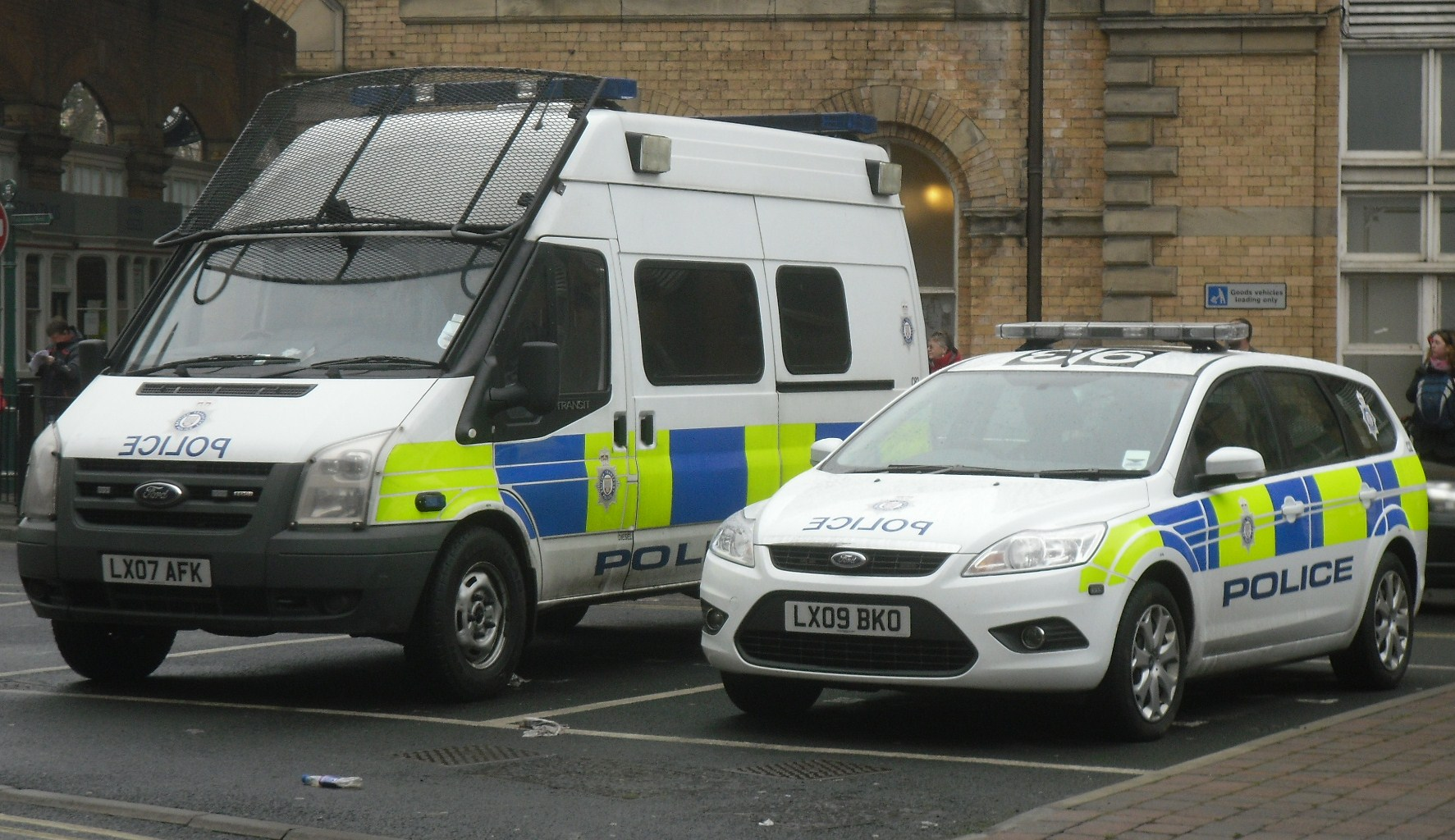
In Great Britain, British Transport Police have full police powers and are a stand-alone special police force.

A transit police force may consist of officers employed directly by a transit system or by a government agency dedicated to providing specialized law enforcement services. There are numerous instances of both within United States, given the decentralized nature of US law enforcement; examples of larger, stand-alone agencies within the US include the MBTA Police, BART Police, and the New Jersey Transit Police Department. In the United Kingdom, transit law enforcement is provided by a single, nation-wide agency, the British Transport Police, although other law enforcement agencies may assist with this task. Within India, many transit policing services are conducted by the Government Railway Police.

=== Specialized units of local law enforcement agencies ===
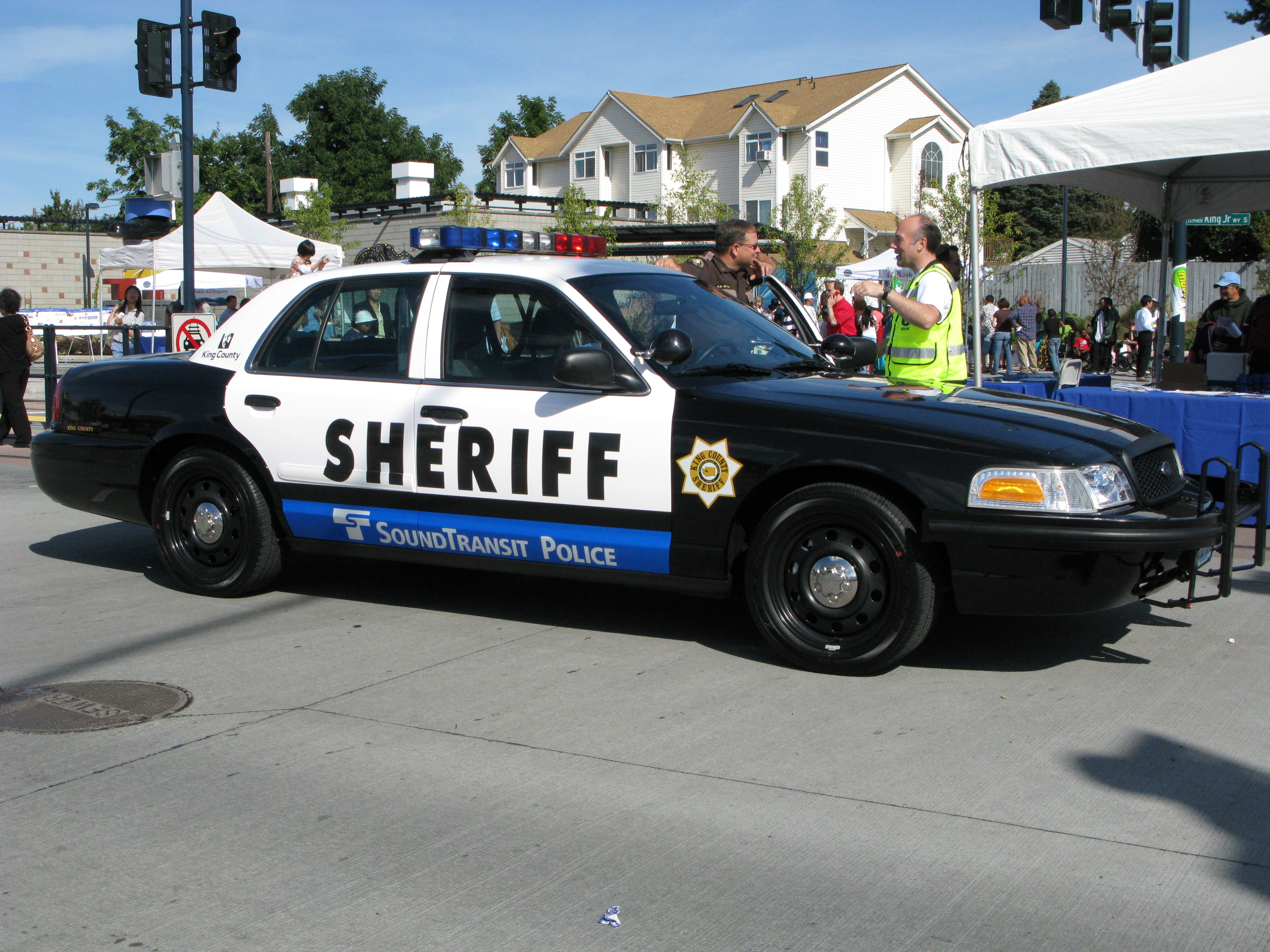
A patrol vehicle of the Metro Transit police, a division of the King County Sheriff's Office, Washington state, USA.

Other forces may exist as a specialized unit of a local law enforcement agency, such as the United States' Transit Police Services Bureau of the Orange County, California Sheriff's Department (which serves the Orange County Transportation Authority) or the Transit Enforcement Unit of the Phoenix Police Department (assigned to the Phoenix Public Transit Department). Some formerly independent transit police agencies have also been absorbed into (or had their duties assumed by) a larger, local law enforcement agency; For example, the New York City Transit Police being amalgamated into the NYPD Transit Bureau.

=== Railroad police ===
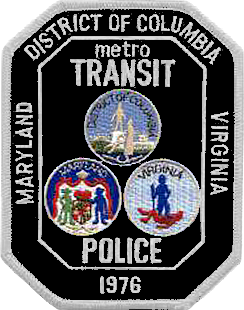
Metro Transit Police Department officers, who hold police powers in Washington, D.C. and two U.S. states, Maryland and Virginia

Where the term "transit police" is used for a law enforcement agency or unit working for a railroad/railway, it usually refers to a railroad providing urban mass transit (such as a city-elevated system or subway) as opposed to long-distance rail carriage.

Law enforcement agencies of both cargo railroads and long-haul rail carriers are usually referred to as "railroad police" or "railway police". There is often considerable overlap in transit police and railroad police agencies’ duties. Railroad police agencies, however, have a long history, and were established separate from and prior to most modern transit police agencies. Transit police and railroad police powers may also be legally defined separately; For example, in the United States, many states have separate laws concerning both types of agencies.

However, in modern times, with increasing overlap in duties and the proliferation of extensive mass transit systems, some jurisdictions have opted for a hybrid model of railroad and transit policing. For instance, in the United Kingdom, most of the rail systems, including the London Underground, are policed by the British Transport Police (BTP). The BTP is a full-service, national law enforcement agency, which essentially combined the duties of dozens of now-defunct transit and railway police agencies into a single entity (the BTP has no authority in Northern Ireland, except in emergencies).

=== Powers ===
Some transit police forces have full policing powers, such as the US' BART Police, SEPTA's Transit Police, Metro Transit Police Department, Utah Transit Authority Police Department or the MBTA Police. The UK's British Transport Police, also has full police powers within Great Britain. In some areas, transit police agencies have limited or specific powers, and may be classed as special police or special constables, or peace officers with limited powers, such as Canada's Edmonton Transit Peace Officers. Regardless, transit police services nearly always hold more authority than un-sworn, security guard-only services.

=== Crimes ===
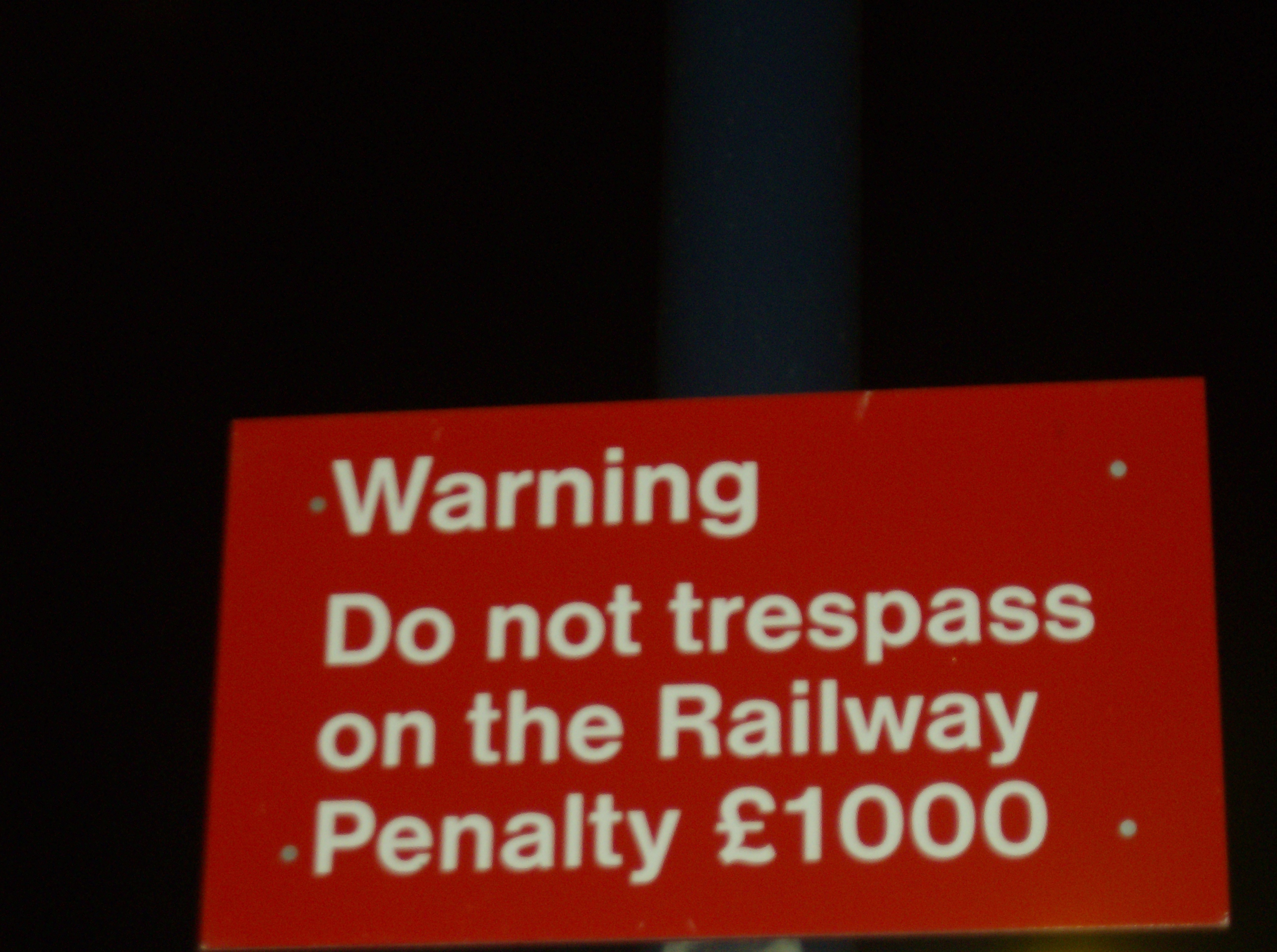
A "Do Not Trespass" sign on the railway in the United Kingdom

Some of the crimes transit police and railroad police investigate include trespassing on the right-of-way of a railroad, assaults against passengers, tagging of graffiti on railroad rolling stock and buses or bus stops, pickpocketing, ticket fraud, robbery and theft of personal belongings, baggage or freight, and drug dealing at transit stations. They may also engage in random ticket checking hoping to catch and fine ticketless travelers. These controls are usually more frequent in transit systems using an honor-based fare collecting approach.

== Jurisdiction and authority ==
In federal states like the United States, Canada, or Australia, federal and state statutes determine the jurisdiction and authority of all police departments, including transit police.

Most transit police services have the same police authority as any other national, state and local police agencies, such as the MBTA Transit Police Department, MARTA (Atlanta) Transit Police, British Transport Police, New Jersey Transit Police Department, BART Police, Maryland Transit Administration Police, DART Police, SEPTA Transit Police, Utah Transit Authority Police Department, and the Metro Vancouver Transit Police (South Coast British Columbia Transportation Authority Police Service). Some agencies have rather extensive jurisdictions, including traffic enforcement and arrest powers on and off property.

== List of specialised transit/transport police agencies and departments ==
=== Australia ===
New South Wales

The New South Wales Police Force Police Transport Command is responsible for policing public transport in New South Wales.

Until 2009, the Commuter Crime Unit within the New South Wales Police Force and RailCorp Transit Officers were responsible for policing public transport, at which point it was replaced by the Police Transport Command.

==== Queensland ====
- Railway Squad, Queensland Police
- Authorised Officers, Queensland Rail
- Translink Senior Network Officers, Translink
- Customer Service Officers, G:link
- Translink Network Officers employed by Bus Operator companies under contract to Translink (Queensland)

==== South Australia ====
- Transit Services Branch, South Australia Police (all public transport in Adelaide). Private security also maintain a presence, especially during peak hours or events.

==== Victoria ====
- Transit Safety Division, Victoria Police members and Protective Services Officers (predominantly operate in Melbourne)
- Authorised Officers employed by Public Transport operator companies and by Public Transport Victoria (PTV).

===== Western Australia =====
- Police Rail Unit, Western Australia Police (operating in Perth)
- Transit Officers, Public Transport Authority of Western Australia

==== Australian Capital Territory ====
Policing for services provided by Transport Canberra is provided by ACT Policing.

==== Northern Territory ====
Policing for public transport services is provided by police public safety officers within the Northern Territory Police Force.

=== Canada ===
==== Police services ====
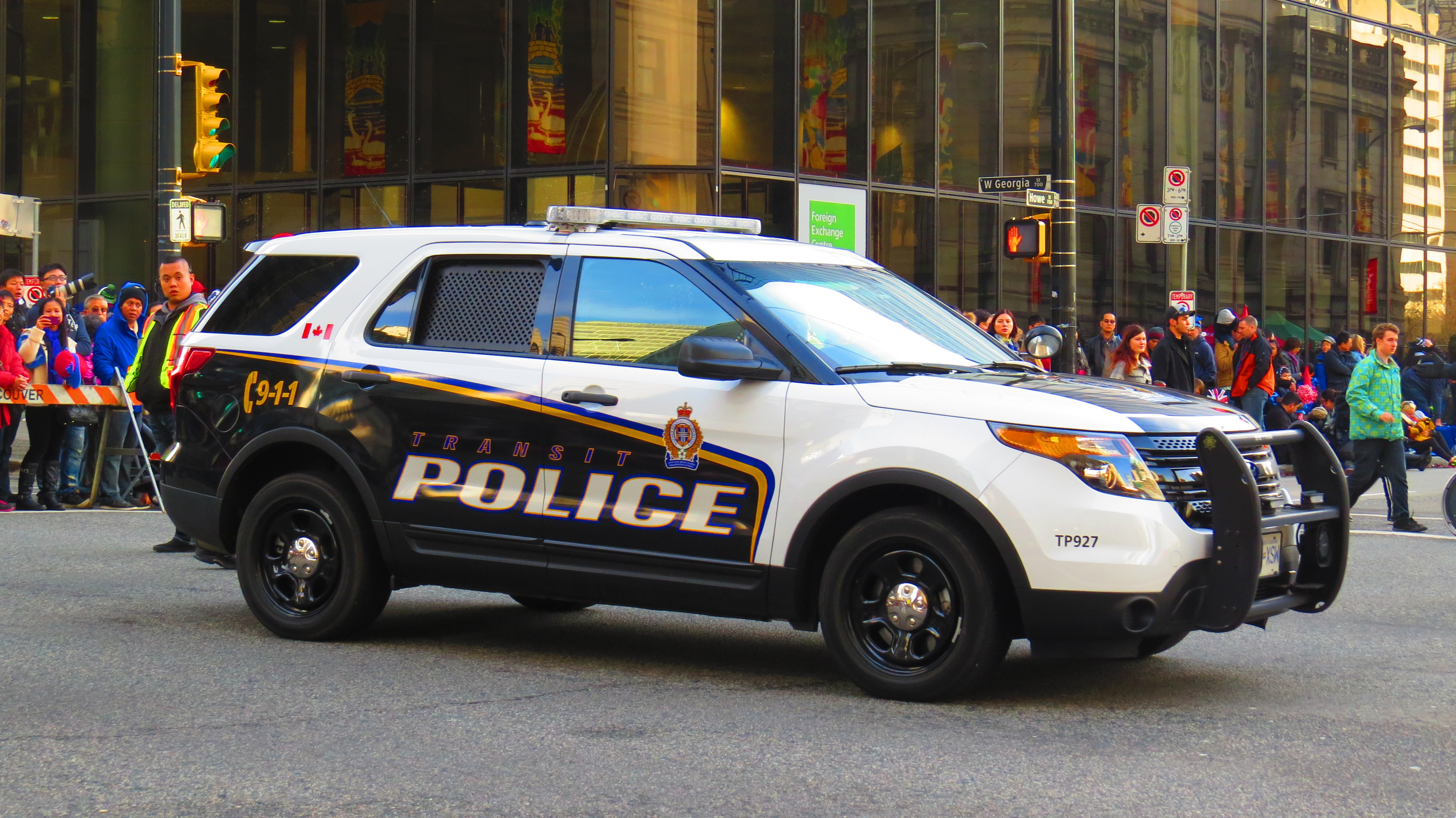
A Metro Vancouver Transit Police Ford Police Interceptor Utility on patrol.

There are two transit police agencies in Canada: the Metro Vancouver Transit Police, a provincially-regulated "designated policing unit" within TransLink, the transit authority for the Metro Vancouver Regional District in British Columbia; and the Via Rail Police Service, a federally-regulated railway police force operated by Via Rail, the provider of intercity rail service for all of Canada. There are also two other federally-regulated railway police services serving the country's two largest freight railways are the Canadian National Police Service and Canadian Pacific Kansas City Police Service.

==== Special constabularies ====
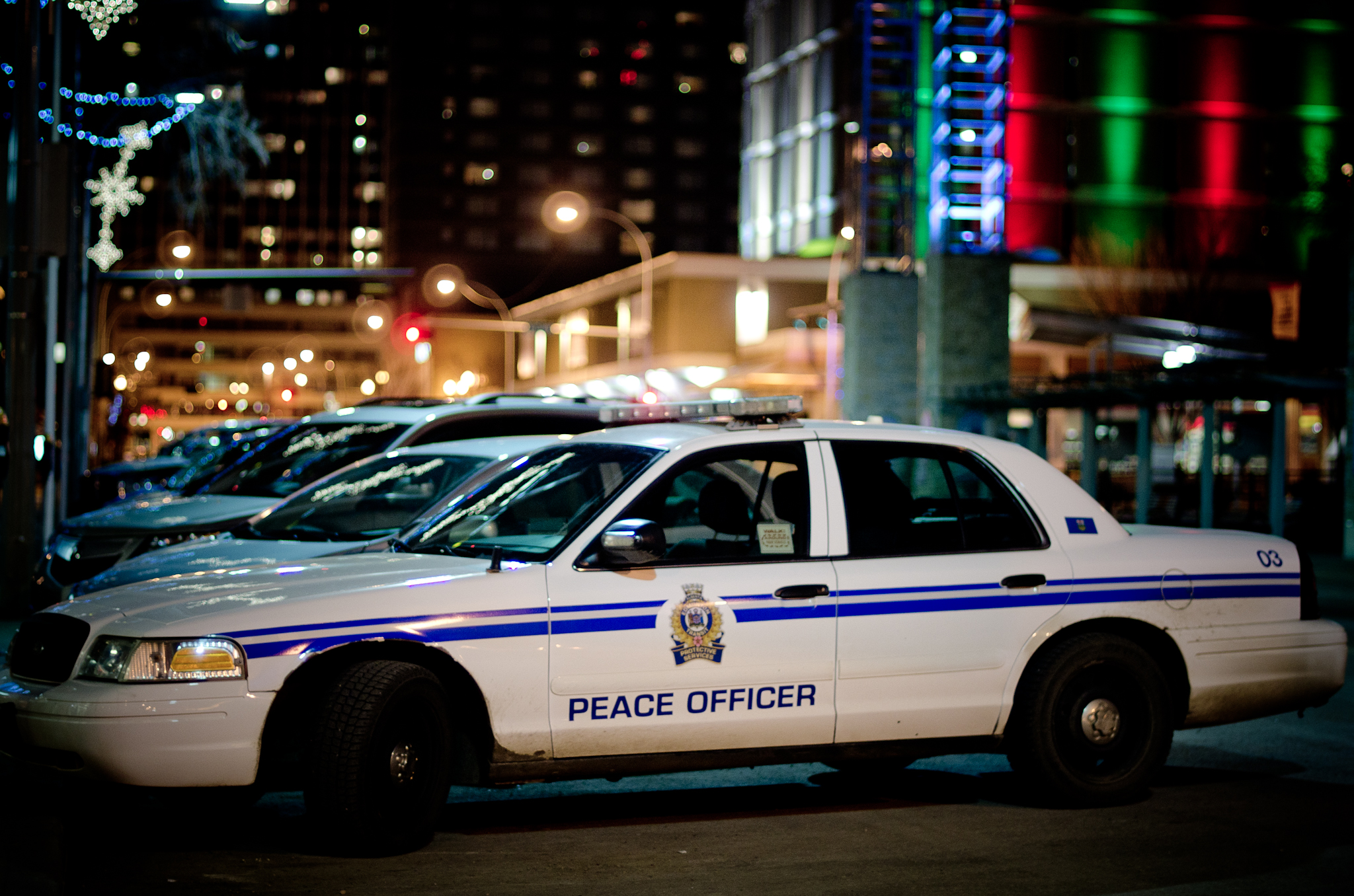
An Edmonton Transit Peace Officer's Ford Crown Victoria Police Interceptor in Edmonton, Alberta

In Alberta, Manitoba, Ontario, and Quebec, large transit systems maintain special constabularies, a type of unarmed police force, to provide safety and law enforcement services on transit property. These agencies have authority over transit by-laws and provincial legislation; the Criminal Code of Canada (in Ontario and Quebec); and their officers variously have the ability to use emergency vehicles with sirens (in Alberta, parts of Ontario, and Quebec) and carry a baton, handcuffs, and pepper spray or gel (in all four provinces).

===== List of transit special constabularies in Canada =====
- Calgary Transit Public Safety and Enforcement Section
- Edmonton Transit Protective Services
- GO Transit Customer Protective Services
- OC Transpo Special Constable Unit
- Société de transport de Montréal Sûreté des réseaux
- Toronto Transit Commission Transit Enforcement Unit
- Winnipeg Transit Safety Officers
- York Region Transit Enforcement and Security

=== People's Republic of China ===
Cities in China which have rapid transit systems all have their transit police force associated to the local public security bureau. There are no non-governmental police forces, or police institutes under transit authority. National Rail used to have a police force under the Ministry of Railways, but such authority has since been transferred to local police agencies.

However, the structure of institutions can be vary from city to city. For example, cities like Tianjin and Chengdu might have a joint public transportation force of division level, operates on all the taxis, bus routes, coaches, rapid transit and ferry lines as well as transportation hubs inside city limit; while Chongqing and Xi'an have tighter transit cop brigades focused exclusively on protecting the mass transit lines. Again, all these agencies are supervised by the PSBs of higher level.

==== Hong Kong ====
- Railway District, Hong Kong Police Force

=== France ===
- Police régionale des transports (Police Nationale) - operates on Paris' suburban trains, and metro
- Service national de la police ferroviaire (Police Nationale-Direction Centrale de la Police aux Frontières) - operates on mainline trains
- Service Interdépartemental de Sécurité dans les Transports en Commun (SISTC) - Police Nationale - Direction Centrale de la Sécurité Publique
- Surveillance Générale (Suge) - operates on SNCF railways. This private service, run by the SNCF, has restricted police powers
- Groupe de Protection et de Sécurisation des Réseaux (GPSR) - operates on RATP railways. This private service, run by the RATP, has restricted police powers
- Police des Transports de l'Agglo Orléans Val de Loire - operates on bus, tram and train service in the Orléans Métropole

=== Germany ===
- former East Germany: Transportpolizei
- current Germany: Bahnpolizei (merged into Federal Police)

=== India ===
The Indian Railway Protection Force (RPF) is a security force, established by the Railway Protection Force Act, 1957; enacted by the Parliament of India for "the better protection and security of railway property". The force is under the authority of the Ministry of Railways, Government of India.

It has the power to search, arrest, investigate and prosecute under specified railway laws, though the ultimate power rests in the hands of the Government Railway Police, under the states.

- Commando for Railway Security (CORAS)
- Government Railway Police (GRP)

The Government Railway Police (IAST: Sarakārī Rēlvē Pulīs), abbreviated as GRP, is the police force of the respective state governments, tasked with policing on railways and their premises. It operates under the respective state police forces. It was established by the Railways Act, 1989, of the Parliament of India. Its duties correspond to those of the District Police in the areas under their jurisdiction, such as patrolling and prevention and detection of crimes but only on railway property. It is the parent agency of the Railway Protection Force (RPF), and aids and provides assistance to it, whose primary duties are to protect and secure all railway property.

The GRP's responsibility is to maintain law and order and investigate crimes on all railway property. Officers are recruited from the Indian Police Service (IPS) and State Police Services (SPS). The force is under the control of the police departments of the various state governments (SPS), in liaison with the federal Ministry of Railways.

=== Ireland ===
The Government of Ireland has proposed establishing a "public transport security force".

=== Italy ===
The Polizia Ferroviaria (Railway Police) within the Polizia di Stato is responsible for policing the railways.

=== Latvia ===
- Port Police (Ostas Policija)

=== Netherlands ===
==== Railway police ====
- Railway Police Service (Unit insfrastructuur, dienst spoor), Dutch National Police (Landelijke Politie eenheid)

==== Transit enforcement ====
- In The Netherlands, all public transport companies providing public service have their own enforcement officers, these officers often have the BOA status (special investigation officer) and limited police powers (use of force, arrest and use of handcuffs) the main task of these officers is fare enforcement and securing the safety of the public and employees within the transport vehicles.
- The city of Amsterdam, is the only municipality in the Netherlands which operates its own transit enforcement department. The "Veiligheidsteam openbaar vervoer" (Safety team public transport) cooperates with the Amsterdam police in maintaining public order within the public transport, stations an hubs within the city limits, prevent or stop crimes, public assistance, issuing transit information and spotting suspicious behavior. Their uniforms are similar to that of police officers (police style hat, yellow high-visibility jacket and trousers with side striping); the only difference with the uniform of a police officer is that the trouser and hat color are dark grey whereas the police uses navy blue. These enforcement officers are employed by the city, whereas the police officers are employed by the national police. Enforcement officers are equipped with handcuffs and a short police baton and have limited police powers like the use of force, making arrests, detaining people and issuing fines. The city of Amsterdam is currently looking into the possibility to equip the officers with a can of pepperspray; this will probably be in mid 2014.

=== New Zealand ===
The National Party has proposed establishing a specific team within the New Zealand Police for policing Auckland Transport.

=== Poland ===
The Railway Security Guard is an armed security forces protecting railway system in Poland.

=== Russia ===
Main Directorate of the Transport of the Ministry of Internal Affairs

=== Singapore ===
Public Transport Security Command (known as TransCom), within the Singapore Police Force, is responsible for policing public transport in Singapore.

=== Sweden ===
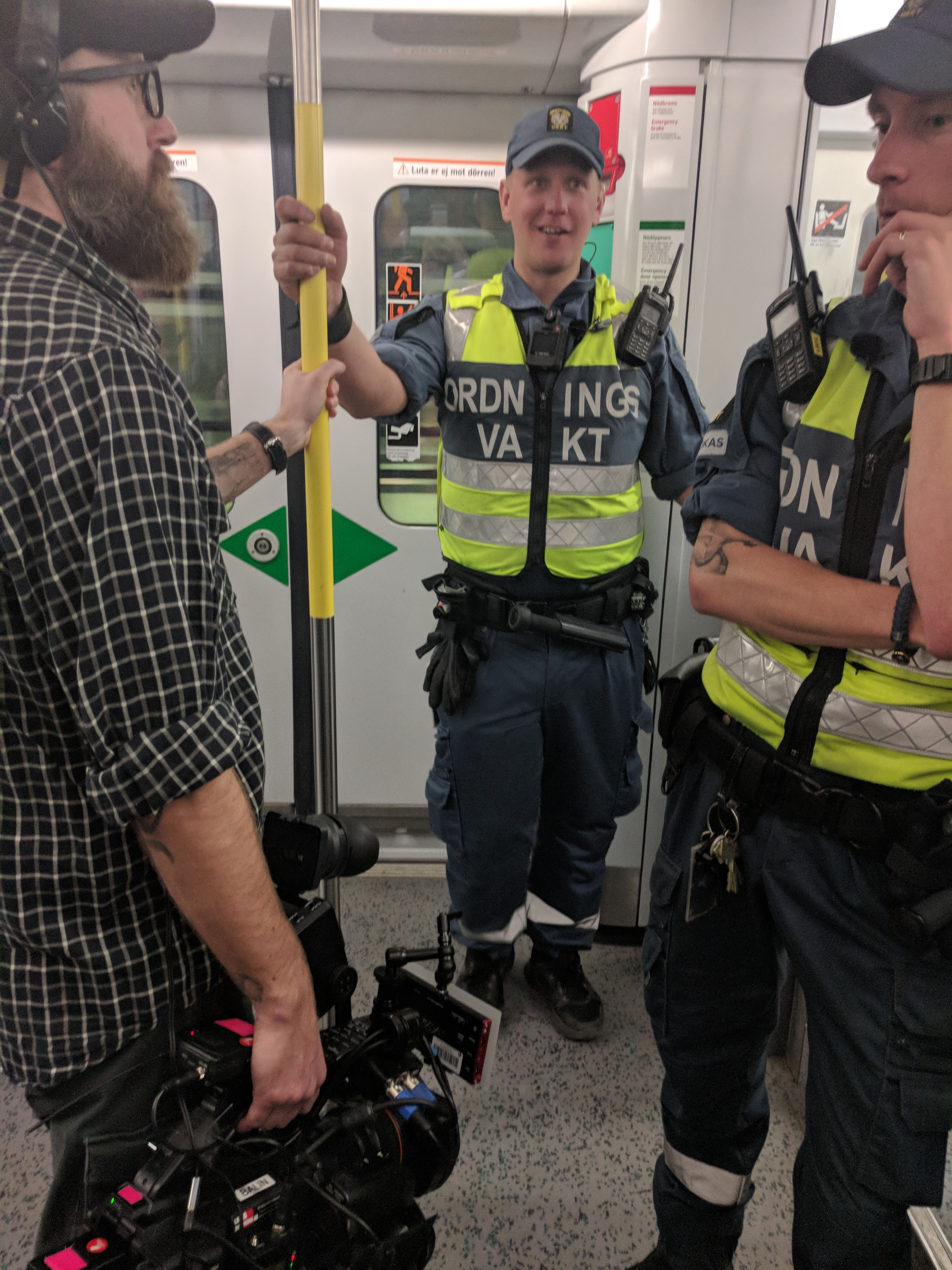

==== Swedish Police Authority ====
Public safety officers (Swedish: Swedish: Ordningsvakt) currently serve as the public transport police force in Sweden. An ordningsvakt is a law enforcement officer appointed and authorized by the Swedish Police Authority to assist in maintaining public order. Their primary role is to support police efforts in ensuring safety and order in public spaces such as transport hubs, trains, buses, boats, and stations.

==== Uniform ====
These officers wear a uniform that is distinct but similar in appearance to that of the Swedish Police, including blue-grey clothing and visible patches marked “ORDNINGSVAKT.” This design helps them to be easily recognised by the public while still maintaining a distinction from full police officers. The overall design is intentional: it closely resembles the Swedish Police uniform in both style and colour, which helps reinforce their law enforcement role in the eyes of the public. However, the distinct “ORDNINGSVAKT” labels make it clear that they are not full police officers, but are operating under delegated authority.

=== Taiwan ===
The Railway Police Bureau (Chinese: 鐵路警察局) of the National Police Agency is responsible for policing the railways across Taiwan.

The Rapid Transit Division within the Taipei City Police is responsible for policing public transport in Taipei. The Kaohsiung City Police is responsible for policing in Kaohsiung.

=== United Kingdom ===
==== Public transport police ====
The British Transport Police is responsible for policing the national railways in Great Britain, the London Underground, Docklands Light Railway, West Midlands Metro, Tramlink, the Sunderland extension of the Tyne and Wear Metro and Glasgow Subway.

The Roads and Transport Policing Command of the Metropolitan Police is responsible for policing Transport for London buses, bus stations/interchanges, taxis and roads. The Metro Unit within Northumbria Police polices the Tyne and Wear Metro. Until 2006, the Metrolink Unit within Greater Manchester Police was responsible for policing Metrolink.

Mersey Tunnels Police is responsible for policing the Mersey Tunnels, and is funded by Merseytravel.

==== Port and harbour police ====
- Belfast Harbour Police — Belfast Harbour, Belfast
- Port of Bristol Police — Port of Bristol, Bristol. Includes Avonmouth Dock, Bristol, Royal Portbury Dock, North Somerset, and 3 islands in the Bristol Channel: Denny Island, Flat Holme, Steep Holme.
- Port of Felixstowe Police — Port of Felixstowe, Suffolk
- Port of Portland Police — Portland Harbour, Isle of Portland
- Falmouth Docks Police — Falmouth Docks, Falmouth, Cornwall
- Port of Dover Police — Port of Dover, Dover
- Port of Liverpool Police — Port of Liverpool, Liverpool
- Port of Tilbury Police (formerly the Port of London Authority Police) — Port of Tilbury, Essex
- Tees and Hartlepool Port Authority Harbour Police — Tees and Hartlepool

=== United States ===
==== Federal police ====
The Amtrak Police Department is responsible for policing services provided by Amtrak.

==== State and local police ====
- BART Police
- BNSF Police Department
- Burbank-Glendale-Pasadena Airport Authority Police
- Dallas Area Rapid Transit (DART) Police Department
- Delaware River and Bay Authority Police Department
- Delaware River Port Authority Police Department
- Greater Cleveland Transit Police Department
- Long Beach Harbor Patrol
- Los Angeles Airport Police
- Los Angeles Port Police
- Maryland Transit Administration Police
- Maryland Transportation Authority Police
- Massachusetts Bay Transportation Authority (MBTA) Transit Police Department
- Metra Police Department (Chicago)
- Metro Transit Police Department, King County Sheriff's Office
- MetroLink Unit, St. Louis County Police Department
- Airport Police Division, St. Louis Metropolitan Police Department
- Metropolitan Atlanta Rapid Transit Authority (MARTA) Police Department
- Metropolitan Transit Authority of Harris County (METRO) Transit Police Department
- Metro Transit - Minnesota Police Department
- Metro Transit Police (Akron, Ohio)
- Napa Valley Railroad Police Department
- New Jersey Transit Police Department
- New York City Police Department Transit Bureau (New York City Subway)
- New York City Transit Police - (Merged into the NYPD in 1995)
- New York Metropolitan Transportation Authority Police
- New York, Susquehanna and Western Railway Police Department
- Niagara Frontier Transportation Authority Transit Police Department
- Northern Indiana Commuter Transportation District Transit Police Department (South Shore Line)
- OCTA-Transit Police Services Bureau, Orange County Sheriff's Department
- Port Authority of Allegheny County Police Department
- Port Authority of New York and New Jersey Police Department (responsible for PATH)
- Port of Portland Police Department (Oregon)
- Public Transportation Section, Chicago Police Department
- SEPTA Transit Police
- Transit Services Bureau, Los Angeles County Sheriff's Department
- Union Pacific Police Department
- Utah Transit Authority Police Department

===== Proposed state and local police =====
in April 2024, he Los Angeles Metro voted to establish the Los Angeles Metro Department of Public Safety.

In June 2027, the Northern Illinois Transport Authority will vote on whether or not to establish a specific transport police, spanning services provided by Chicago Transit Authority, Metra and Pace.

== See also ==
- 1995 Paris Métro and RER bombings
- 2004 Madrid train bombings
- 7 July 2005 London bombings
- 21 July 2005 London bombings
- 2006 Mumbai train bombings
- 2006 Madrid-Barajas Airport bombing
- 2007 Samjhauta Express bombings
- Fare evasion
- Penalty fare
- Public transport security
- Sarin gas attack on the Tokyo subway
- Security on the Mass Rapid Transit (Singapore)
- September 11 attacks
