= New Jersey Transit Police Department =

Law enforcement agency of New Jersey Transit

- Common name: New Jersey Transit Police
- Abbreviation: NJTPD

Agency overview
- Formed: 1983
- Employees: 300+

Jurisdictional structure
- Operations jurisdiction: New Jersey and New York, U.S.
- Legal jurisdiction: New Jersey and New York
- General nature: Civilian police

Operational structure
- Headquarters: Newark, New Jersey, U.S.
- Police Officers: 250+
- Non Sworn Employees: 70+
- Agency executive: Christopher Trucillo, Chief of Police
- Parent agency: New Jersey Transit

Website
- New Jersey Transit Police

The New Jersey Transit Police Department (NJTPD) is a transit police agency of the New Jersey Transit Corporation in the state of New Jersey. As provided by NJS Title 27:25-15.1, New Jersey Transit Police Officers have "general authority, without limitation, to exercise police powers and duties, as provided by law for police officers and law enforcement officers, in all criminal and traffic matters at all times throughout the State and, in addition, to enforce such rules and regulations as the NJ Transit Corporation shall adopt and deem appropriate."

The primary focus of NJTPD is providing police services to the numerous bus depots, rail and light rail stations throughout New Jersey. The New Jersey Transit Police Department is the only transit police agency in the United States with statewide authority and jurisdiction.

== History ==
The NJ Transit Police Department was created on January 1, 1983, and it evolved as a result of the passage of the Public Transportation Act of 1979 and subsequent legislation on the state and federal levels. At that time, the original complement included thirty-nine Commissioned Rail Police Officers. On January 12, 1990, NJS 27:25-15.1 was enacted into law, and it established the New Jersey Transit Police Department as a sworn law enforcement agency with the "general authority, without limitation, to exercise police powers and duties, as provided for police officers and law enforcement officers, in all criminal and traffic matters at all times throughout the State..." The authorized strength of the Department includes 250+ sworn officers and 70+ non-sworn members (which include Fare Enforcement Officers) serving the more than 500,000 commuters who use the NJ Transit system daily. In addition to NJT's rail and bus network, the New Jersey Transit Police is responsible for policing NJT's Hudson-Bergen Light Rail, Newark Light Rail, and River Line systems.

== Districts ==
The New Jersey Transit Police Department has its headquarters located at One Penn Plaza East in Newark. However, the department has seven different districts to provide coverage to New Jersey Transit's extensive system of railways and bus terminals.

District 1:

- Headquarters - Newark, New Jersey

District 2:

- Penn Station Command - Newark

District 3:

- Hoboken Command - Hoboken

District 4:

- Secaucus Junction - Secaucus

District 5:

- Trenton Command - Trenton

District 6:

- Camden Command - Camden

District 7:

- Atlantic City Command - Atlantic City

=== Organization and operations ===
Each of the regional commands provide different police services for their geographical area they cover, the different divisions within the department can be categorized as the following,

- Patrol - By far the largest operation within the department. The patrol division provides general law enforcement services to those utilizing the New Jersey Transit System as well as providing a presence to deter crime. Patrol officers are responsible for enforcing criminal and motor vehicle infractions. A bike patrol unit was established to supplement on foot officers.
- Detective Bureau - Investigates threats directed towards the transit system and crimes committed on transit property.
- Special Operations - Encompasses different units such as the Emergency Service Unit, Conditions Tactical Unit, and the K-9 unit.
- Emergency Service Unit - This unit was formerly the JUSTICE Team (renamed in 2011), which was NJTPD's high visibility enforcement unit who were assigned to "Impact" zones, which are New Jersey Transit properties and stations that have experienced a surge in crime. ESU has extensive training in numerous fields such as Special Weapons and Tactics, to include high risk warrant service, barricaded subject, hostage rescue, rope/high angle rescue, train/vehicle extrication, firefighting duties, SCUBA diving, and are all HAZ-MAT technicians. The Emergency Service Unit operates a number of heavy duty rescue type trucks.
- Administration / Support Services - The higher-ranking officers who are responsible for reporting the daily operations to the New Jersey Transit Corporation itself, as well as the responsibility for overseeing the day-to-day functions of the department. Includes the Training Unit, Intel Unit, and Information Technology Unit.
- K9 Unit - New Jersey Transit Police has multiple K9 Teams that are deployed statewide daily, conducting proactive K9 sweeps and maintaining high visibility at New Jersey Transit facilities.

=== Rank structure ===
The NJTPD has the following rank structure, in descending order:

Title	Insignia	Uniform Shirt Color
Chief		White
Deputy Chief		White
Inspector		White
Captain		White
Lieutenant		White
Sergeant		LAPD Navy
Detective / Police Officer		LAPD Navy

== Counter-terrorism ==
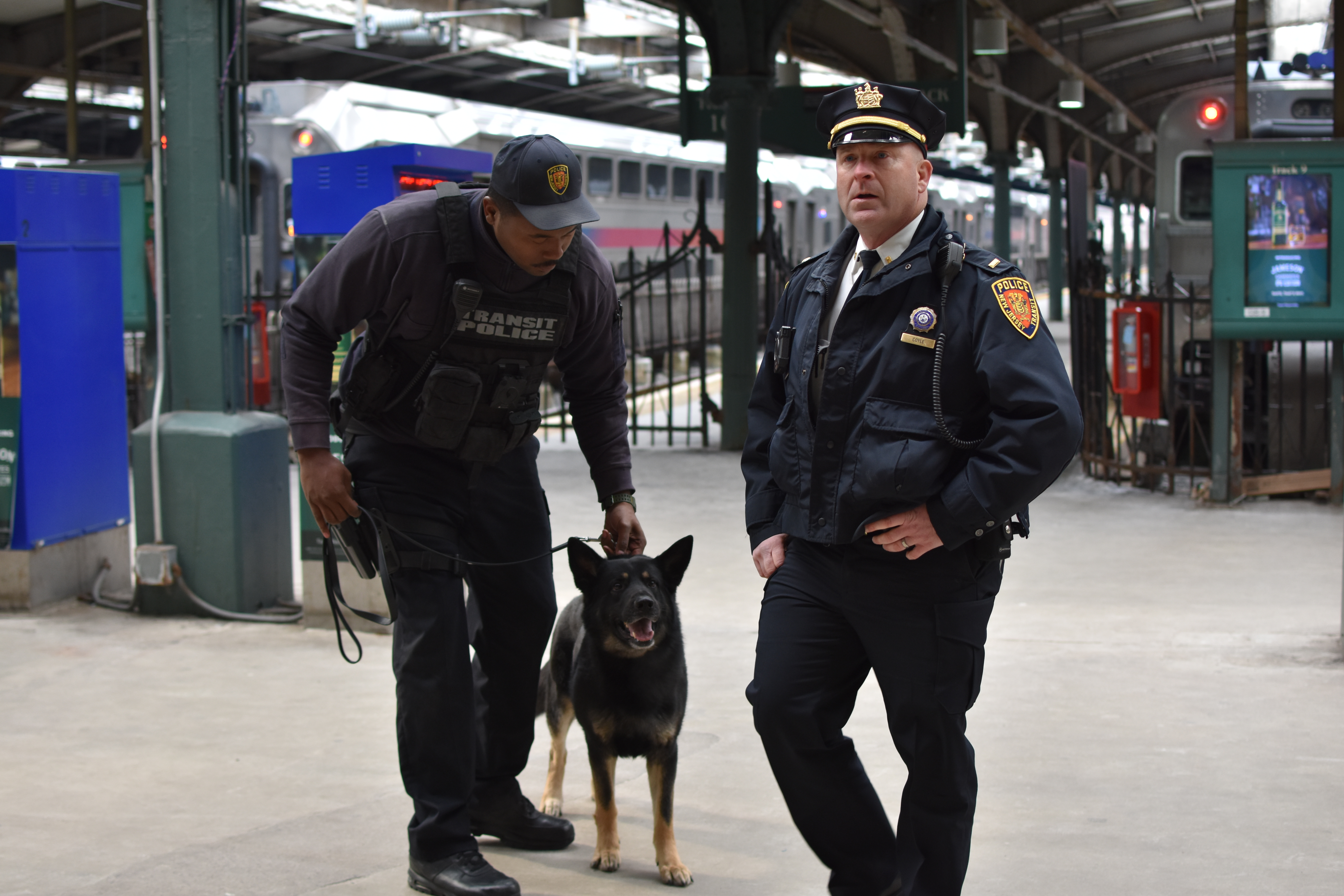
New Jersey Transit Police K-9 Officer and Lieutenant at Hoboken Terminal

One of the primary missions of the New Jersey Transit Police Department is the prevention of terrorism on all of New Jersey Transit's trains and buses. This is especially relevant since the 2004 terrorist attacks of the transit system in Madrid, Spain.

After September 11, 2001, the Essex County, New Jersey Sheriff's Office had a tenfold increase in requests for bomb detection. This caused a problem for New Jersey Transit, according to the agency's then police chief, Mary F. Rabadeau. At Penn Station in Newark, the transit authority had been dependent on the Essex County Sheriff's bomb squad to respond to every bomb threat or suspicious parcel. That disrupted the station, sometimes for hours, having an immense impact on transportation in the area, because the station is host to hundreds of daily Amtrak and New Jersey Transit trains, plus two rapid transit lines and intercity and local buses. The best resource the agency could provide with the most apparent and immediate impact was canine bomb-detection teams. After interviewing people at other agencies that had their own canine bomb-detection squads, New Jersey Transit chose the Essex County, New Jersey Sheriff's Department to train the Transit Police on New Jersey Transit property—on trains and buses and in stations and other facilities where the teams would be working. The program was fairly inexpensive, using dogs that had washed out of seeing-eye training but were calm and obedient, which were fine for bomb detection. New Jersey Transit customized three road vehicles so that the teams could operate statewide, presenting themselves without notice. By patrolling Penn Station, the teams have "hardened it as a target and are welcomed by passengers, said Rabadeau". Because a large percentage of bomb alerts turn out to be false, the fast response minimizes disruption to the flow of trains and passengers. The teams also give demonstrations at schools and terminals and provide assistance to other agencies.

During his tenure, former Governor James McGreevy helped dramatically expand the counter-terrorism capabilities of the New Jersey Transit Police. The governor allowed the purchase of a Police Mobile Command Vehicle, which is a 40-foot (12 m) transit bus converted into a mobile response unit for the New Jersey Transit Police Department. The vehicle contains outside phone lines, a fax machine, portable computers and printers, and an on-board radio system with several frequency bands to communicate with other law-enforcement agencies, as well as other regional transit agencies. The following measures were also enacted:

- New Jersey Transit has increased uniformed and plainclothes police train patrols
- New Jersey Transit has created special operations units which specifically focus on high visibility patrol and counter terrorism
- New Jersey Transit significantly increased the number of New Jersey Transit Police K-9 units – which are trained to detect explosive devices.
- New Jersey Transit purchased belt clip-on radiation detectors as well as other explosive and radiological material detecting equipment to ensure that all of its regional police commands and officers throughout the state are equipped to detect explosives and radiological matter.
- The New Jersey Transit Police Department launched the "If you see something say something" campaign and has activated telephone and text message hotlines to accept anonymous calls and text messages of suspicious activity and/or persons on New Jersey Transit equipment or property.
- The New Jersey Transit Police Department provides counter terrorism and behavioral analysis training to all its officers.
- Significantly increased the number of its uniformed and plainclothes police officers at stations, on board trains and in road patrol units. Officers ride trains randomly at any given time during the day. New Jersey Transit Police are protecting passenger facilities, maintenance facilities and infrastructure.
- The New Jersey Transit Police Department has established vehicular checkpoints at several stations and terminals, particularly where deliveries are accepted.
- New Jersey Transit Police are alternating patrolling methods and locations on a daily basis to include uniformed and plainclothes officers, facility checks conducted by officers on motor patrol and proactive sweeps by special operations units .

== Uniform and equipment ==
The New Jersey Transit Police uniform is a traditional dark blue uniform, LAPD Navy in color, similar to the uniforms of the NYPD, Newark Police Department, Boston Police Department, Baltimore City Police Department, and numerous other northeast police departments.

Officers in Special Operations wear a B.D.U. uniform and tactical outer vest. Patrol Officers wear a traditional police uniform with leather duty gear.

All sworn police officers are issued the Axon Body 2 body-worn camera for use while in uniform on patrol.

The standard issue firearm for New Jersey Transit Police is the SIG Sauer P320 chambered in 9mm. Transit Police also utilize the Heckler and Koch UMP 40 submachine gun, Remington 870 Police Magnum shotgun, and Colt M4 Police Carbine rifle. The SIG MCX VIRTUS in the SBR configuration has also been seen issued as of early 2020. Department snipers assigned to the Emergency Service Unit utilize the Remington 700 Sniper rifle.

== Vehicles ==
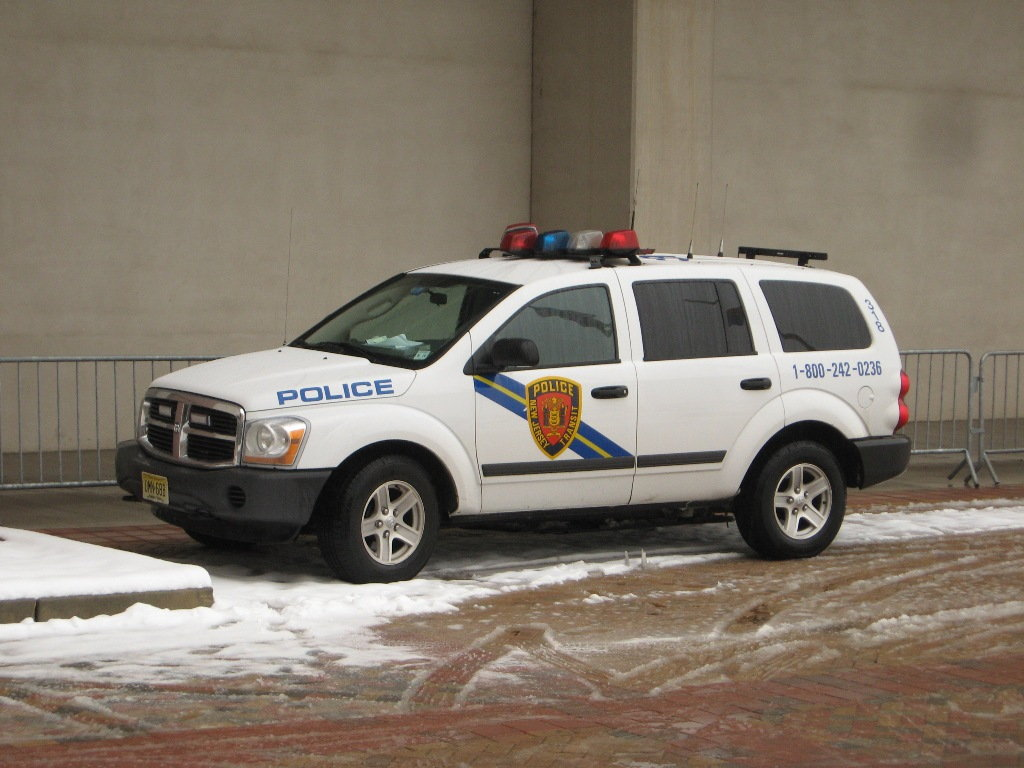
New Jersey Transit Police Dodge Durango Unit

New Jersey Transit Police utilize several different models of vehicles in their fleet. Among the vehicles, referred to as an "RMP" (Radio Motor Patrol), are the Chevrolet Caprice, Ford Explorer, Ford Taurus, Chevrolet Tahoe, Ford Expedition, Ford F-150 and the Chevrolet Suburban. Transit Police officers also ride the buses and railways to provide more direct policing. In addition, NJTPD has several mobile command centers and mobile processing vehicles at strategic locations. In 2011, the agency received a Pierce Rescue/Pumper truck, known as ESU 7 (197), which is capable of going off-road (Hi-Rail) and onto the rails where needed and is capable of extinguishing fires. It has a 1500 gpm pump, 350 gallon water tank, and 30 gallon foam tank. The Emergency Service Unit operates a number of heavy duty rescue type trucks.

== See also ==
- Amtrak Police Department
- List of law enforcement agencies in New Jersey
- New York City Transit Police
- New York Metropolitan Transportation Authority Police Department
- Port Authority of New York & New Jersey Police Department
