= Transportpolizei =

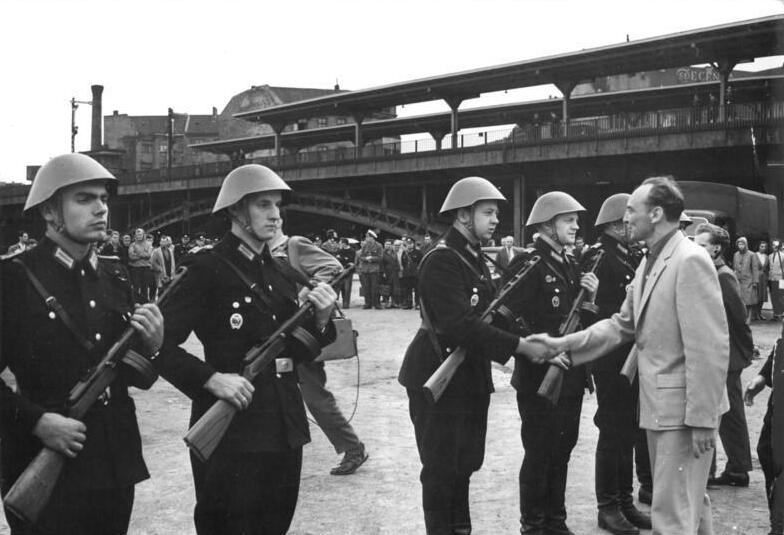
Transportpolizei Honor Guard in Mauerbau, East Berlin, 1961

The Transportpolizei (German for "Transport Police", sometimes known as Trapo) was the transit police of the German Democratic Republic (East Germany), whose officers were commonly nicknamed TraPos. It was part of the Volkspolizei and dealt with all modes of transit, but primarily with trains and railroads. It supervised all larger train stations and controlled the travellers, particularly at the border with West Germany, and directed traffic.

Before the building of the Berlin Wall, the Transportpolizei controlled the S-Bahn in West Berlin (as the Deutsche Reichsbahn controlled the S-Bahn in both East and West Berlins). In the 'interzone courses' (later called 'transit courses'), there was always an escort party of the Transportpolizei present. The service training school of the Transportpolizei was in Halle.

== History ==
The Transportpolizei was founded in 1953. From January 1953 until February 1957, the Transportpolizei was part of the Ministry for State Security, in turn part of the Office of the Secretary of State. Starting from March 1957, it was transferred to the Volkspolizei, whose supervising inspector was Otto Auerswald.

After the German reunification of 1990, the Transportpolizei was dissolved, with some 1,200 of its personnel transferring to the (West) German Bahnpolizei. On April 1, 1992, the Bahnpolizei was taken over by the German Federal Border Guard (now called the German Federal Police).

== Organization ==
The Transportpolizei consisted of approximately 8,500 men that were organized from a national level and at district level, with each Deutsche Reichsbahn district: East Berlin, Cottbus, Dresden, Erfurt, Greifswald, Halle, Magdeburg and Schwerin. They wore dark-blue uniforms (that were colloquially called “blueberries”), instead of the standard green Volkspolizei uniform. They were organized into sixteen companies and equipped with small arms and RPG-7 shoulder-fired antitank grenade launchers.

=== Ranks ===
The following ranks were observed in the Trnasportpolizei:

- POLICE MAJOR GENERAL
- POLICE COLONEL
- POLICE LIEUTENANT COLONEL
- POLICE MAJOR
- POLICE CAPTAIN
- POLICE LIEUTENANT FIRST CLASS
- POLICE LIEUTENANT
- POLICE LIEUTENANT SECOND CLASS
- POLICE SERGEANT FIRST CLASS
- POLICE SERGEANT MAJOR
- POLICE MASTER SERGEANT
- POLICE STAFF SERGEANT
- POLICE CORPORAL
- POLICE LANCE CORPORAL
- POLICE CANDIDATE
- Officer student of the VP - 4th academic year (From 1984)
- Officer student of the VP - 3rd academic year
- Officer student of the VP - 2nd academic year
- Officer student of the VP - 1st academic year
- Student officer in professional training

== Bibliography ==
- Wolfe, Nancy T. (1992). Policing a Socialist Society: The German Democratic Republic. Bloomsbury Academic. ISBN 978-0313265303.
- Wolfgang Mittmann (1998); Die Transportpolizei (1945–1990), Berlín: Links, Forschungen zur DDR-Gesellschaft.
