= Irma Lozada =

American police officer

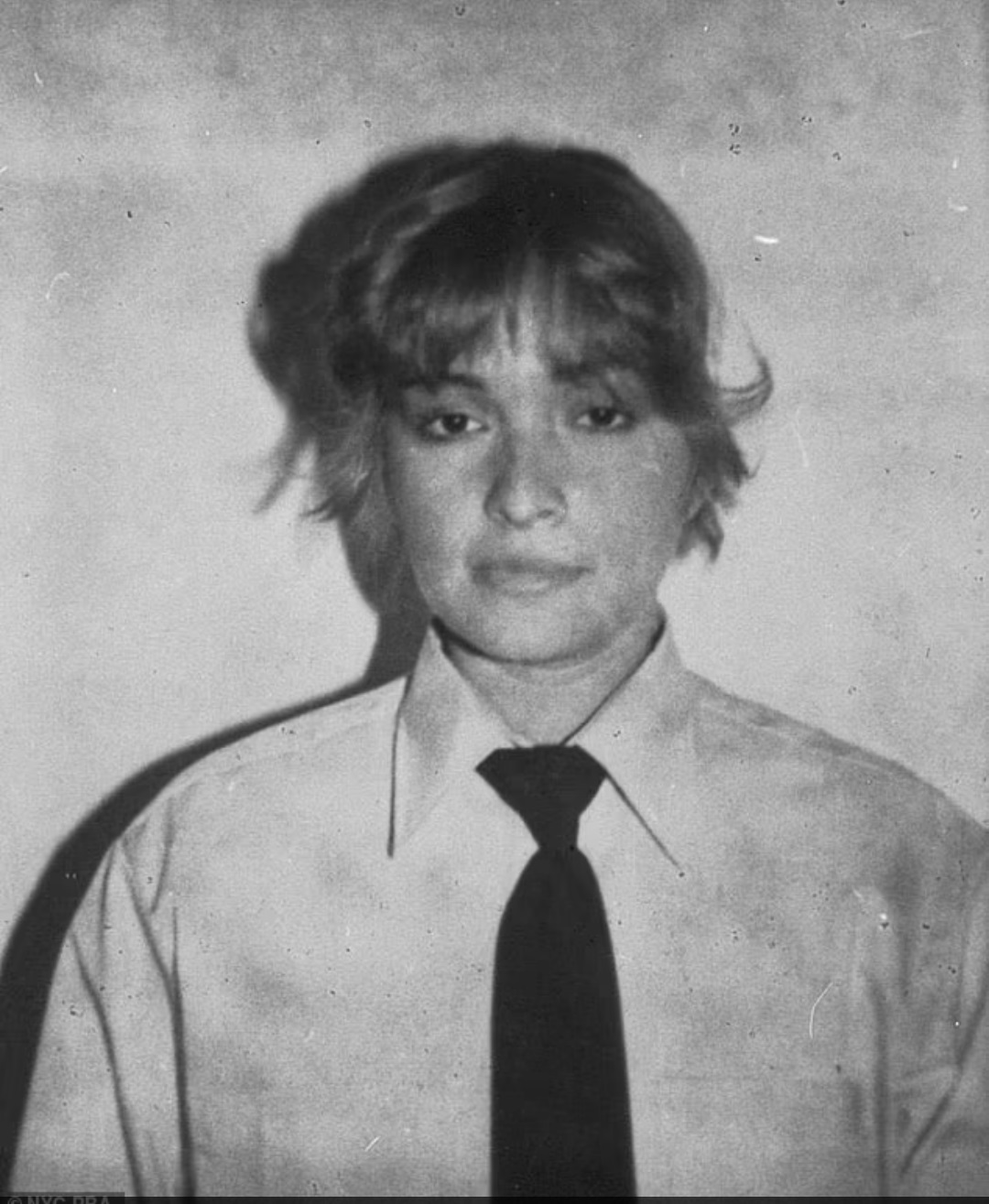
- Born: April 26, 1959; Manhattan, New York, U.S.
- Died: September 21, 1984 (aged 25); Brooklyn, New York, U.S.
- Other name: Fran
- Police career
- Department: New York City Transit Police
- Service years: 1980–1984
- Shield no.: 4721

Irma Lozada (April 26, 1959 – September 21, 1984), a.k.a. "Fran", was a member of the New York City Transit Police who was killed in 1984, becoming the first female police officer to die while at work in New York City.

== Early life and education ==
In the 1950s, Lozada's parents had moved from Puerto Rico to Manhattan in New York City where she and her brother were born. There, she received her primary and secondary education. As a child, Lozada spent her summers with her family in the City of Mayaguez in Puerto Rico.

In 1980, Lozada applied for, and was accepted into, the New York City Transit Police Academy in October 1981. She graduated in the first academy class of transit officers that had a significant number of women and was assigned to District 33 at 2399 Fulton Street, Brooklyn, N.Y., as a plainclothes transit officer. At the time, the NYPD and the New York Transit Police were separate entities. The New York City Transit Police Department was a law enforcement agency that existed from 1953 (with the creation of the New York City Transit Authority) until 1995.

In the early 1980s, many male transit police officers still viewed women as undesirable partners. Nevertheless, Lozada's work was noticed by her superiors and she was promoted to the Transit Police District #33 and assigned to the Plainclothes Anti-Crime Unit, a street crime unit. This brought her closer to her goal of becoming a detective.

== Death ==
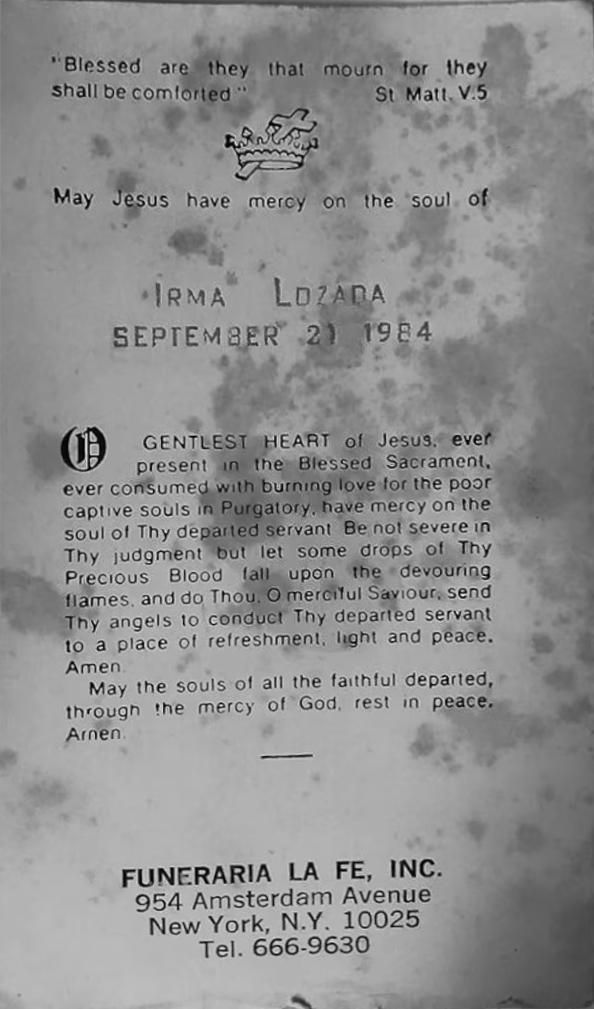
Funerary program brochure for Lozada's funeral in September 1984

On September 21, 1984, Lozada, then having less than 3 years on the force, and her partner were assigned to patrol the BMT Canarsie Line (then the LL train) in plainclothes. During her patrol at Wilson Avenue station in Bushwick, Brooklyn, she witnessed a suspect, Darryl Jeter, snatch a jewelry necklace from an unsuspecting train rider.

Lozada and her partner split up while chasing the suspect. She chased him to a nearby abandoned lot located at the intersection of Central Avenue and Chauncey Street and waited at the lot, which was heavily weeded and was loaded with junk. When confronted by the suspect she pretended to be looking for a lost dog with the intention that the suspect would not suspect her real motives. The suspect then turned around to look for the dog and Lozada pulled out her service gun. As Lozada attempted to handcuff the suspect, he turned and took her gun. According to Jeter, Lozada pleaded for her life to no avail. The suspect then shot her twice in the face. The first time Jeter fired, the bullet passed through her cheek. He then walked a short distance only to return after a few moments to shoot her in the face, killing her. Lozada's body was found three hours later in the lot; she was the first female officer to be killed in the line of duty in New York City.

Jeter was later apprehended and charged with second degree murder, possession of a weapon, possession of stolen property and grand larceny. He was found guilty of second degree murder and criminal possession of a weapon and convicted. Jeter was sentenced to serve 32.5 years to life in prison and was released on parole on December 7, 2021.

== Legacy ==
External videos
- Documentary:Fallen Heroes In America: The Police Officer Irma Lozada Story

Briton Film Works LLC produced a documentary film about Lozada.

Lozada was buried in Calvary Cemetery in Woodside, Queens. She is survived by her mother and brother. In the memorial ceremony at Calvary Cemetery in 2004, NYPD Police Commissioner Raymond W. Kelly stated:

It is difficult to tell how a single event changes pervasive attitudes. But this death was, you might say, the jolting realization of the equality of the risk.

On October 2, 2012, a bill, whose provisions include renaming a street in Brooklyn in honor of Lozada, was signed into law by Mayor Mike Bloomberg. The street dedication occurred on November 10, 2012. "Irma Lozada Way" is located at the intersection of Fulton Street and Van Sinderen Avenue in East New York, Brooklyn.

== See also ==
- List of Puerto Ricans
