= Bahnschutzpolizei =

German railway police (1939–1945)

Bahnschutzpolizei (BSP) (Railway Protection Police) in Nazi Germany was made up of full-time and part-time police officers who were employees of the Reichsbahn (state railways). The Bahnschutzpolizei was tasked with railway safety and also with preventing espionage and sabotage of railway property. It was not subordinated to Hauptamt Ordnungspolizei, only the Deutsche Reichsbahn.

== Origins ==
The BSP was founded in 1939 after a merger of the Bahnpolizei (Railway Police) and the Reichsbahnschutz (Railway Protection Force). The former railway police formed the permanent cadre, while the bulk of the organization consisted of the former railway protection men, railway employees who alongside their day-time job served as a security force.

== Organization ==
The BSP was a special police organization (Sonderpolizei) completely subordinated to the Deutsche Reichsbahn. It was not dependent on Ordnungspolizei. During World War II most of the BSP personnel were mobilized and used as a permanent railway security force in the occupied Eastern Europe. As a replacement within Germany, the SS-Bahnschutz, a railway security force under the SS was founded in 1944.

== Ranks ==
#	Bahnschutzpolizei 1941–1945	Bahnschutzpolizei 1939–1941	Reichsbahnschutz before 1939	Bahnpolizei (Streifdienst) before 1939	Relative rank
1.	–	Staatssekretär als oberster Bahnschutzpolizeiführer / Leiter der Gruppe "L" im Reichsverkehrsministerium	Staatssekretär als oberster Bahnschutzführer / Leiter der Gruppe "L" im Reichsverkehrsministerium	–	Generalleutnant
2.	Chef der Bahnschutzpolizei	Reichsbahnschutzführer	Reichsbahnschutzführer	–	Generalmajor
3.	Stabsführer der Bahnschutzpolizei	Stabsführer der Bahnschutzpolizei	Bahnbevollmächtiger	–	Oberst
4.	Bahnschutzpolizei-Bezirkshauptführer	Bahnschutzpolizei-Bezirkshauptführer	Bahnschutz-Bezirkshauptführer / Stabsführer im Reichsverkehrsministerium	–	Oberstleutnant
5.	Bahnschutzpolizei-Bezirksführer	Bahnschutzpolizei-Bezirksführer	Bahnschutz-Bezirksführer	–	Major
6.	Bahnschutzpolizei-Hauptabteilungsführer	Bahnschutzpolizei-Hauptabteilungsführer	Bahnschutz-Abteilungsführer	Streifdienstleiter bei der RBD	Hauptmann
7.	Bahnschutzpolizei-Oberabteilungsführer	Bahnschutzpolizei-Oberabteilungsführer	Bahnschutz-Oberabteilungsführer	Stellvertretender Streifdienstleiter bei der RBD	Oberleutnant
8.	Bahnschutzpolizei-Abteilungsführer	Bahnschutzpolizei-Abteilungsführer	Bahnschutz-Abteilungsführer	Streifabteilungsführer	Leutnant
9.	Bahnschutzpolizei-Oberzugführer	Bahnschutzpolizei-Oberzugführer	Bahnschutz-Oberzugführer	Oberstreifenführer	Oberfeldwebel
10.	Bahnschutzpolizei-Zugführer	Bahnschutzpolizei-Zugführer	Bahnschutz-Zugführer	Streifenführer	Feldwebel
11.	Bahnschutzpolizei-Unterzugführer	Bahnschutzpolizei-Unterzugführer	Bahnschutz-Unterzugführer	–	Unterfeldwebel
12.	Bahnschutzpolizei-Gruppenführer	Bahnschutzpolizei-Gruppenführer	Bahnschutz-Gruppenführer	Streifer	Unteroffizier
13.	Stellvertretender Bahnschutzpolizei-Gruppenführer	Stellvertretender Bahnschutzpolizei-Gruppenführer	Stellvertretender Bahnschutz-Gruppenführer	–	Obergefreiter
14.	Bahnschutzpolizei-Mann	Bahnschutzpolizei-Mann	Bahnschutz-Mann	–	Gefreiter
15.	Bahnschutzpolizei-Anwärter	Bahnschutzpolizei-Anwärter	Bahnschutz-Anwärter	–	Schütze
