= MBTA Transit Police =

Transit police agency

Agency overview
- Formed: 1968
- Jurisdiction: MBTA district (177 municipalities)
- Employees: 264 sworn officers
- Agency executive: Chief Kenneth Green
- Website: MBTA Transit Police

The MBTA Transit Police is a transit police agency which has primary jurisdiction on Massachusetts Bay Transportation Authority (MBTA) property and vehicles in the 177 municipalities within the MBTA district. The department has an authorized size of 266 officers and 10 civilians.

== Jurisdiction ==
Headquarters in Boston

The MBTA Transit Police Department has jurisdiction and full police authority in all of the 177 cities and towns that comprise the MBTA service area. Outside the 177 cities and towns, the Transit Police exercises street railway police powers on the vehicles, properties and rights of way that comprise the Commuter Rail System. The Transit Police promotes safety and security throughout Greater Boston and eastern Massachusetts, working with federal, state and local law enforcement agencies.The MBTA Transit Police Department provides police services to patrons and employees of the Authority on MBTA property and vehicles.

Enforcement of transit-related laws off MBTA property, such as writing parking tickets at bus stops, is shared with municipal police departments, and the Massachusetts State Police on Massport and DCR property.

== History ==
In October 1968, legislation was passed (Chapter 664 of the Acts of 1968, amended by Chapter 829 of the Acts of 1970 and Chapter 329 of the Acts of 1993) which created the MBTA Police Department (hereafter referred to as the MBTA Transit Police Department or the MBTA Transit Police) under the provisions of Massachusetts General Law (M.G.L.) Chapter 31. The first full-time MBTA Transit Police Officers were hired on December 9, 1968. The legislation established:

- a Police Department under the supervision of a Police Officer to be known as a Chief of Police;
- provided that all Police Officers except for the positions of the Chief, Superintendent or Major would be subject to M.G.L. Ch. 31;
- provided that all Police Officers would have, within the territorial limits of the authority, the powers and duties conferred or imposed upon Police Officers of cities and towns by M.G.L. Ch. 41, Sec. 98;
- provided MBTA Transit Police Officers additional powers of Railway Police Officers under M.G.L. Ch. 159 Sec. 93;
- and provided that MBTA Transit Police Officers have the same authority on city or town property as they have on MBTA property.

On August 5, 2006, the local media reported the MBTA Police could merge with the Massachusetts State Police due to budgetary and staffing concerns. The union which represents the MBTA Transit Police supports this plan citing the difficulty the 257-member force has providing security for a transit system that spans 177 cities and towns in the state. They also cite a rider to officer ratio of 5,058 passengers per transit officer, far greater than the national average of 1,759 passengers per transit officer. The union reasons that after a merger, the existing MBTA officers could form a new State Police troop concentrating on providing security for inner-city Boston subway and bus systems, while state police officers could concentrate on commuter rail stations, T parking and MBTA routes outside of the city. The union representing state police officers opposes the merger citing different training methods and selection processes for officers and extra competition for promotion opportunities. Because of the projected cost of the merger (estimated at $11 million), the merger was considered unlikely.

== See also ==
- List of law enforcement agencies in Massachusetts
