= RailCorp Transit Officer =

Function of RailCorp train services in Australia

Transit Officers were the security and fare compliance function for RailCorp train services in New South Wales, Australia. Transit Officers conducted uniformed and plainclothes patrols on CityRail and CountryLink train services and assigned to ensure the security of passengers, staff and rail property. The position was created in 2002 after a report found that rail security required more authority than possessed by the Chubb Security security guards contracted by RailCorp. Previous figures showed that over 600 Transit Officers had been engaged, however the number was reduced to 150.

NSW Transit Officers were phased out in December 2013, when all security functions across the Transport Cluster were transitioned to the New South Wales Police Transport Command. At the same time Transport for New South Wales (TfNSW) created the new and distinct role of Transport Officer, deployed across the network in a revenue protection role only.

== Status and powers ==
=== Legal status ===
The Rail Safety Act 2008 provides for persons employed as a RailCorp Transit Officer to be appointed as a "Rail Safety Officer" for the purposes of the Rail Safety Act 2008 and its subordinate legislation. The Act and Regulations establish various railway offences and the powers of an authorised officer in relation to those offences.

A Transit Officer was also able to be appointed as a special constable under the Police (Special Provisions) Act 1901, which would give the Transit Officer similar legal powers as a constable of the New South Wales Police Force, but only while on RailCorp property. A requirement of employment as a Transit Officer is eligibility to be appointed as a special constable.

=== Legal powers and responsibilities ===
By virtue of the Rail Safety Act 2008 and the Rail Safety (Offences) Regulation 2008, Transit Officers are empowered to:

- Request tickets and concession cards for inspection,
- Direct people to leave stations and trains,
- Demand full name and residential address when they suspect, on reasonable grounds that a person has committed a railway offence,
- Issue infringement notices ('on-the-spot' fines) for railway offences.

In 2013, the Rail Safety Act 2008 was repealed and the NSW Government subsequently introduced a new legislative framework for rail safety under the Rail Safety National Law (NSW). Section 168(3) of the new legislation provides Transit Officers with the power to require proof of identity documentation where they reasonably suspect a name and address provided to them may be false.

Prior to the introduction of the new legislation, unless appointed as a special constable, a Transit Officer had no legal basis to demand identification documents.

=== Power of arrest ===
Transit Officers, unless they were appointed as a special constable, were not granted any specific power of arrest by legislation. The power of arrest as exercised by Transit Officers is commonly referred to as a citizen's arrest and is granted to all persons in New South Wales by section 100 of the Law Enforcement (Powers and Responsibilities) Act 2002.

By virtue of section 231 of the Law Enforcement (Powers and Responsibilities) Act 2002, a person making an arrest under section 100 may use reasonable force to make the arrest or to prevent the escape of the person after arrest. Upon making an arrest, the Transit Officer would make arrangements to transfer the person into police custody.

== Uniform and equipment ==
=== Uniform ===
Transit Officers wore a distinctive mid blue and black uniform with Rail Corporation of N.S.W. arm patches and yellow rank insignia on their shoulders. RailCorp reviewed the uniform worn by Transit Officers in 2008 with feedback from focus groups deeming the old dark grey uniforms too threatening and "SWAT-like". A week-long trial of blue uniforms took place from 20 February 2008, with RailCorp conducting a survey of passengers to gauge the public response to the changes. As a result of this process, the new uniforms were progressively issued to officers in the closing months of 2008 which was worn until 2013, when Transit Officers were phased out.

=== Equipment ===
Transit Officers carried batons and handcuffs while on duty. For communication between other transit officers and base operations they carried Motorola XTS5000 radios which use the NSW Government Radio Network (GRN) to remain in contact over all of Sydney and surrounds.

=== Rank insignia ===
Transit Officers had a rank structure, insignia of which was worn on their epaulettes. Ranks set out below ascend in seniority from left to right. One rank that is not shown in the pictures below, is that of a Probationary Transit Officer. The rank comes before a Transit officer on the far left and is a solid black epaulette with no other decoration.

Transit Officer	Transit Officer (1 Year +)	Senior; Transit Officer	Senior; Transit Officer (1 Year)	Transit; Team Leader	Operations; Inspector	Regional; Operations; Manager

== Training ==
Transit Officers underwent a six-month training programme focusing on rail law and law enforcement based customer service, they received training covering the Rail Safety Act, the Crimes Act, the Evidence Act, the Young Offenders Act, Graffiti Control Act, investigation and crime scene preservation. During these six months Transit Officers gained experience in oral de-escalation techniques, Defensive tactics, the use of batons and handcuffs were done with Corrective Services NSW, rail safety, communications, documenting, briefs of evidence and various other areas. Upon completion of their training officers received the Certificate III in Government.

== Criticism ==
The NSW Premier has said the NSW Ombudsman has made valid criticisms of the behaviour of some of the state's 600 transit officers and of RailCorp's failings in addressing complaints.

The NSW Ombudsman has called for proper oversight to rein in the officers.

Ombudsman Bruce Barbour has raised serious concerns about the way RailCorp investigates complaints regarding the behaviour of transit officers.

In his annual report to parliament, Mr Barbour says many of the public's complaints about the officers related to serious issues such as assault, use of excessive force and grossly inappropriate conduct.

"People have been assaulted, people have been inappropriately treated, one person was made to squat for 15 minutes while he was handcuffed until police arrived but ultimately he wasn't charged with anything," he said.

"He had a valid ticket and he hadn't done anything wrong."

== Abolition ==
The Sydney Morning Herald reported on 21 February 2009 that the NSW government was considering abolishing Transit Officers and transferring their responsibilities to the NSW Police Force.

In September 2011 the NSW State Government announced that the Transit Officer function might be dissolved or moved to the NSW Police Force. Under the State Governments plan the 600 current transit officers would be abolished by the end of 2012. Officers would be offered three options, redundancy, new positions as revenue protection officers or placement at the NSW Police Force College to train to be police officers if they meet the requirements.

In February 2012 the State Government announced that Transit Officers would be cut back to 150 positions from a total of 600 and redeployed as non-confrontational 'revenue protection officers' across all three modes of public transport (rail, bus and ferry) with the new title of "Transport Officer". 310 Police will replace 600 Transit Officers in public safety duties as part of a restructuring of the 610 strong Police Transport Command. This occurred prior to the end of 2013.
