= Amtrak Police Department =

Railroad police department of Amtrak

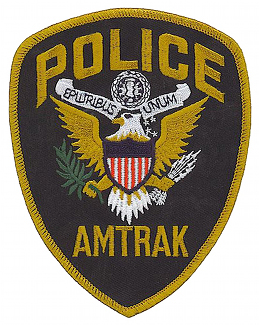
- Supervisor Patch of the Amtrak Police Department
- Common name: Amtrak Police
- Abbreviation: APD

Jurisdictional structure
- Federal agency (Operations jurisdiction): United States
- Operations jurisdiction: United States
- Legal jurisdiction: Amtrak Rail System
- General nature: Federal law enforcement; Civilian police
- Specialist jurisdiction: Railways, tramways, rail transit systems

Operational structure
- Headquarters: Washington, D.C.
- Police Officers: 431
- Agency executives: James Cook, Chief of Police

Website
- police.amtrak.com

The Amtrak Police Department (APD) is a federal railroad police department of Amtrak (also known as the National Railroad Passenger Corporation), the government-owned passenger train system in the United States. It is headquartered at Union Station in Washington, D.C., and as of 2019 has a force of 452 sworn police officers, most of whom are stationed within the Northeast Corridor, Amtrak's busiest route.

The APD has primary jurisdiction over Amtrak stations nationwide, trains, rights-of-way, maintenance facilities, and crimes committed against Amtrak, its employees, or its passengers. The APD is one of six American Class I railroad law enforcement agencies, alongside those of BNSF, CPKC, CSX, Norfolk Southern, and Union Pacific.

Since 1979, most Amtrak police officers have been trained at the Federal Law Enforcement Training Centers (FLETC) although some recruits may be certified through a local police academy.

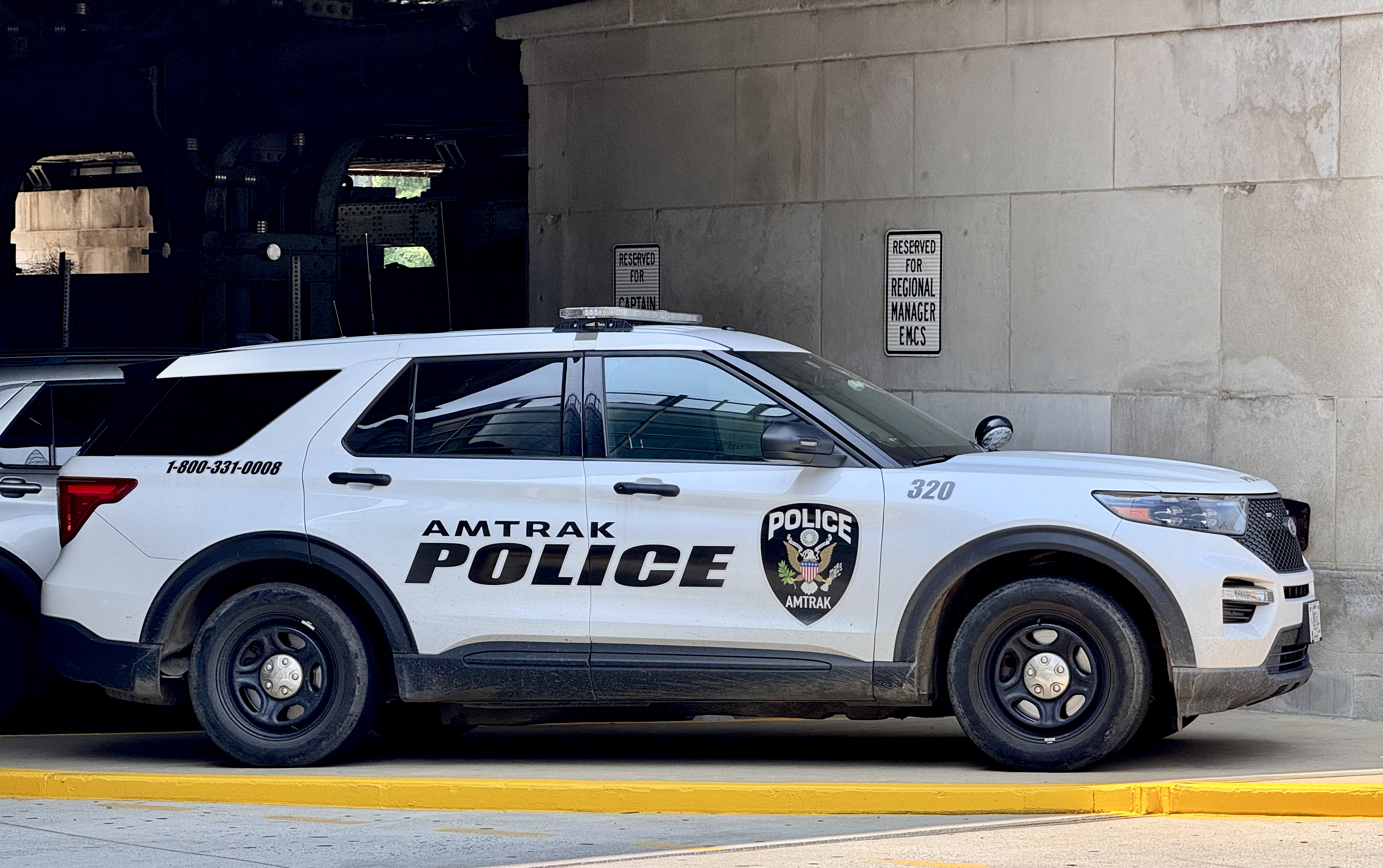
Amtrak Police SUV outside 30th Street Station

== Authority ==
Created by Congress, Amtrak's enabling legislation under the Rail Passenger Service Act of 1970, now codified starting at 49 U.S.C. § 24101, established the authority for Amtrak to have its own police force.

The statutory authority was unique at the time and included interstate police powers. The Amtrak rail police law, now found at 49 U.S.C. § 24305(e), states as follows:

(e) Rail Police. —Amtrak may employ rail police to provide security for rail passengers and property of Amtrak. Rail police employed by Amtrak who have complied with a state law establishing requirements applicable to rail police or individuals employed in a similar position may be employed without regard to the law of another state containing those requirements.

In sum, Amtrak police officers have the same police authority as a local or state law enforcement officer, within their jurisdiction. They investigate various types of crime that occur within and around stations, trains and rights of way.

== Counter-terrorism ==
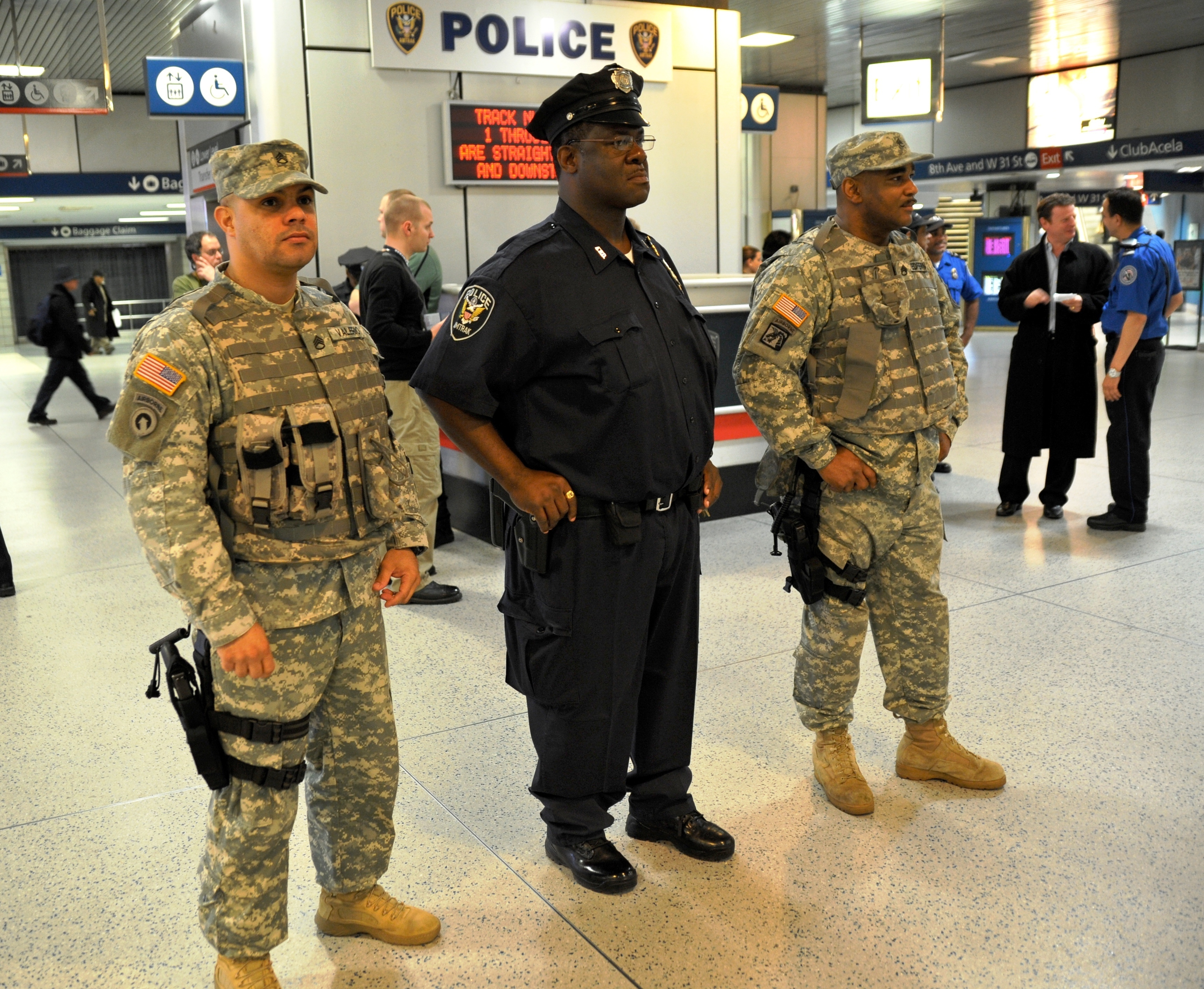
New York National Guard members and an Amtrak police officer at New York Penn Station in 2012

Since the September 11 attacks, APD has become more terrorism-focused. Such mission shift became even more prevalent after the Madrid train bombings in 2004. It maintains a robust K-9 division composed of patrol and bomb dogs.

== Police cover ==
APD officers work in partnership with federal, state and local law enforcement to perform their duties in accordance with the agency's mission to protect America's railroads. In theory, officers have jurisdiction in all the 46 states where Amtrak operates but generally are stationed in busier locations.

== Operational Divisions ==
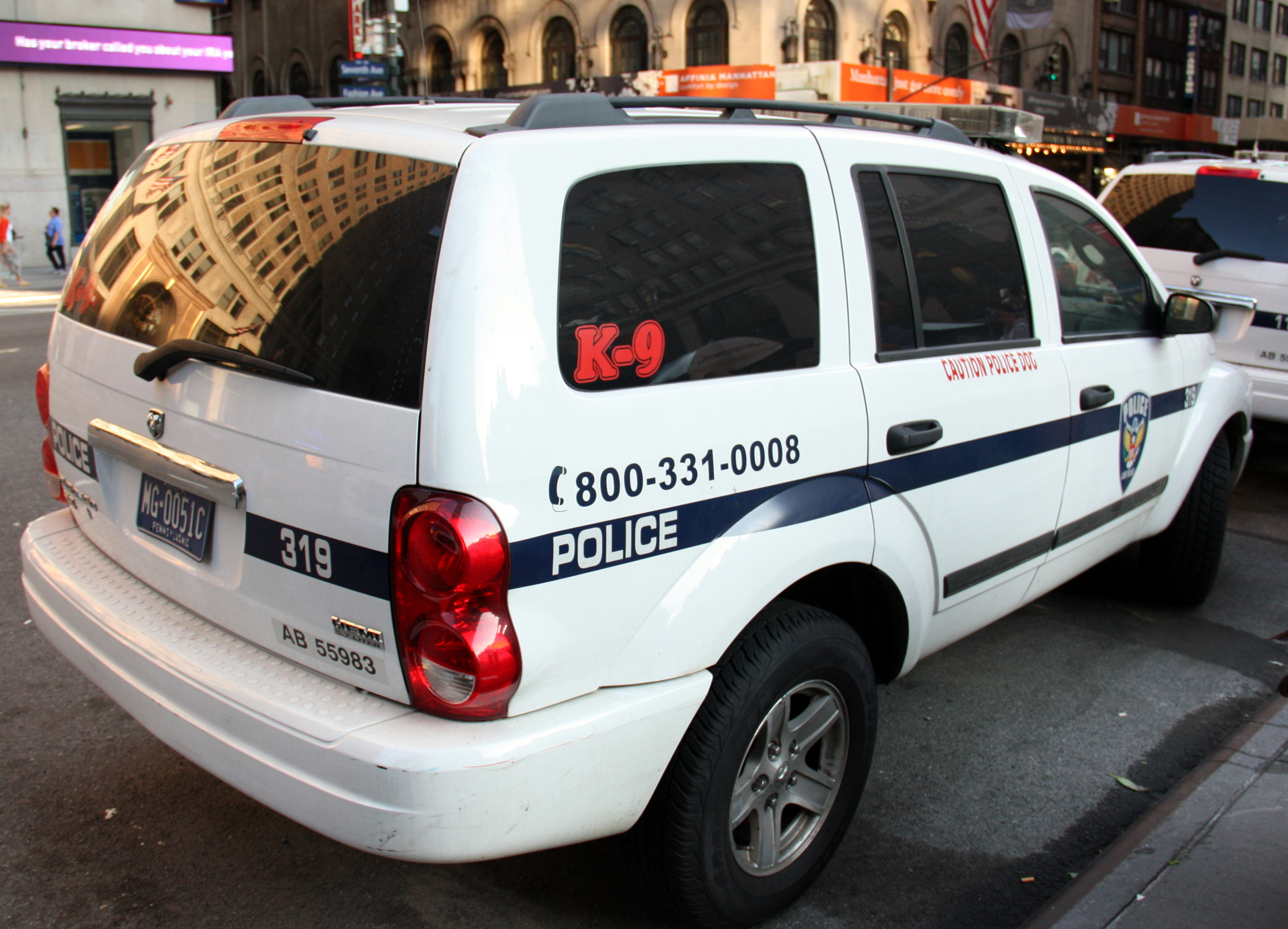
Amtrak Police Department K9 unit

Each of the Divisional Commands provides various police services for the geographical area they cover. The different divisions within the department can be categorized as the following:

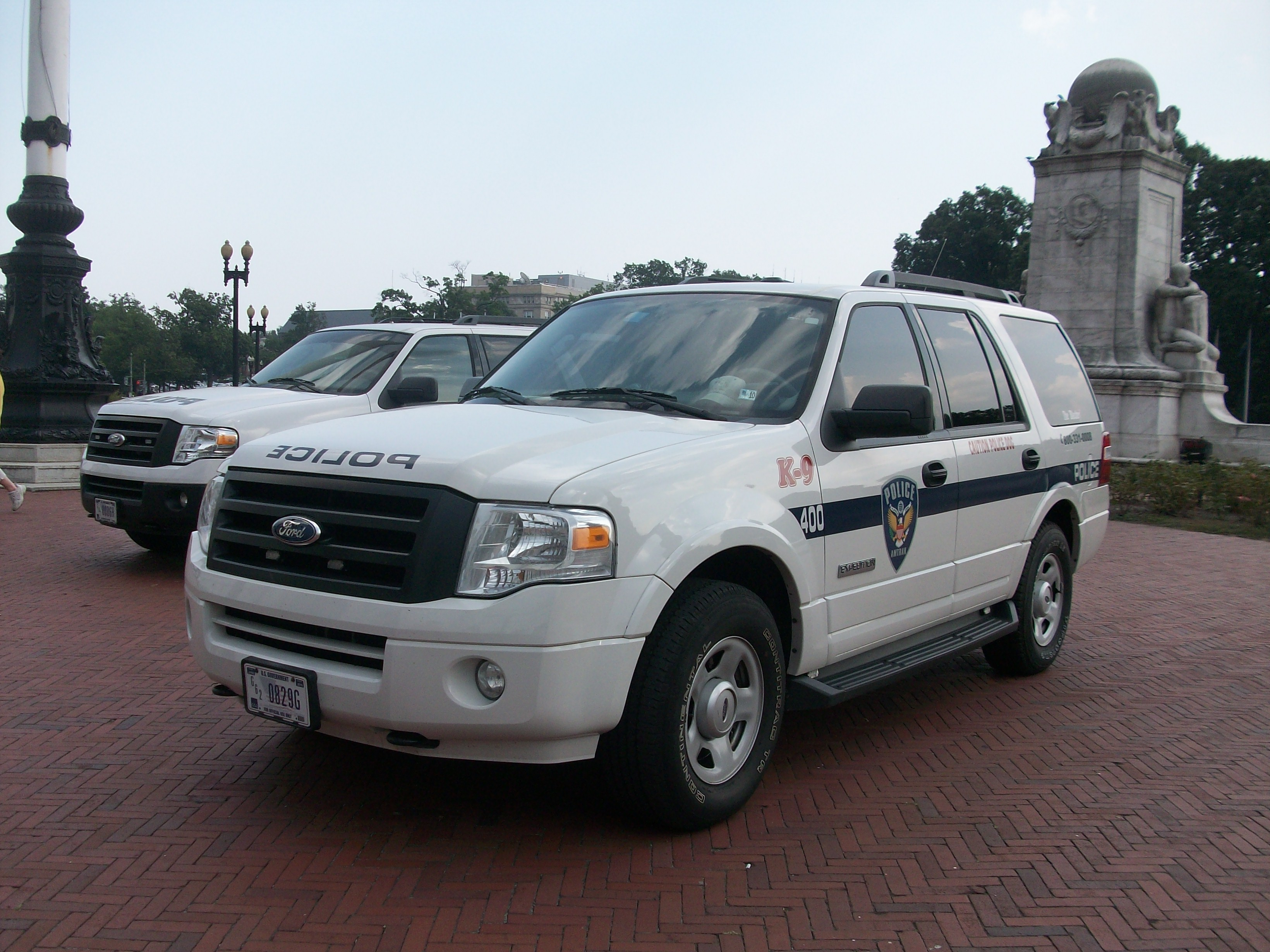
Amtrak Police SUVs outside Washington Union Station in July 2011

- Patrol Division – Patrol Officers fulfill traditional policing functions. They act as a deterrent to crime in the stations, on trains, in and around Amtrak facilities, and out on the rights-of-way by enforcing laws, providing support at stations, and boarding trains.
- Criminal Investigations Division – The Criminal Investigations Unit is responsible for most follow-up investigations and the coordination of any criminal investigative efforts. This Division includes both investigators and detectives.
- Office of Intelligence and Analysis – The Office of Intelligence and Analysis serves as a support element for the various patrol divisions. Through analysis and dissemination of intelligence information, it seeks to increase the safety and security of the passengers and personnel by increasing the department's insight into ongoing threats and potential terrorist acts.
- Administration – The higher-ranking officers who are responsible for reporting the daily operations to the Amtrak Corporation itself, as well as the responsibility for overseeing the day-to-day functions of the department.
- Support Operations Divisions – Includes the Training Unit, Quartermaster Unit, Police Technology Unit, and Police Report Requests Unit.
- K9 Unit – The Amtrak Police Department K-9 teams provide a deterrent to potential threats from explosives. K9 teams are deployed at stations and occasionally on trains throughout the system as well as right-of-way patrols.
- National Communications Center – Amtrak's National Communications Center (NCC) is the coordination center for the Amtrak Police Department. NCC Communications Officers answer calls and respond to text messages from the APD11 "txt-a-tip" system. The NCC also dispatches officers as needed to respond to incidents and events throughout the country.

== Rank structure and insignia ==
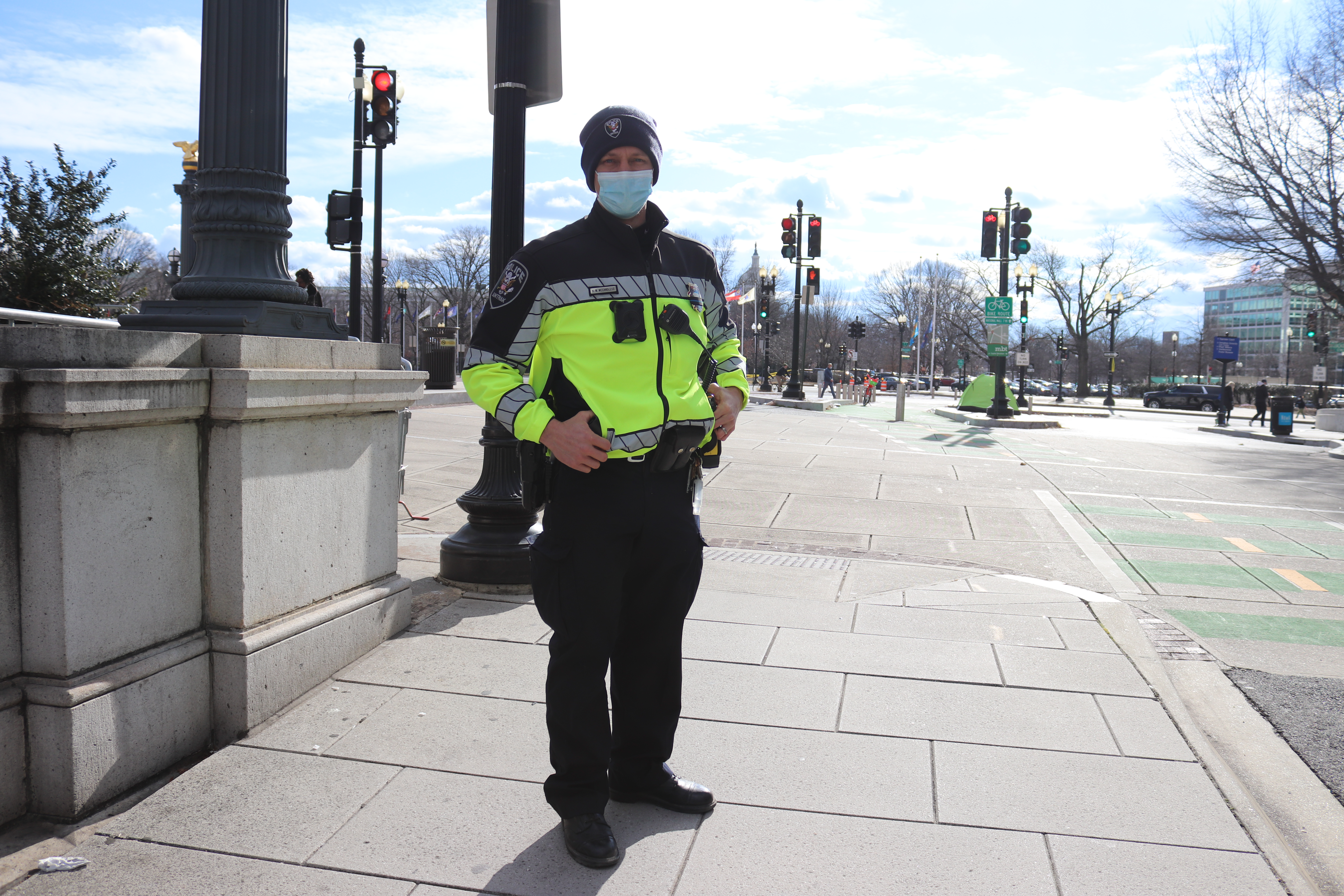
An Amtrak police officer on patrol

Below is the rank structure for the Amtrak PD. Ranks are listed from junior (bottom) to senior (top).

Title	Insignia
Chief of Police	
Assistant Chief of Police	
Deputy Chief	
Inspector	
Captain	
Lieutenant	
Sergeant	
Detective (Gold Badge/insignias)	
Special Agent (Gold Badge/insignias)	
Criminal Investigator	
Police Officer	

== Controversies ==
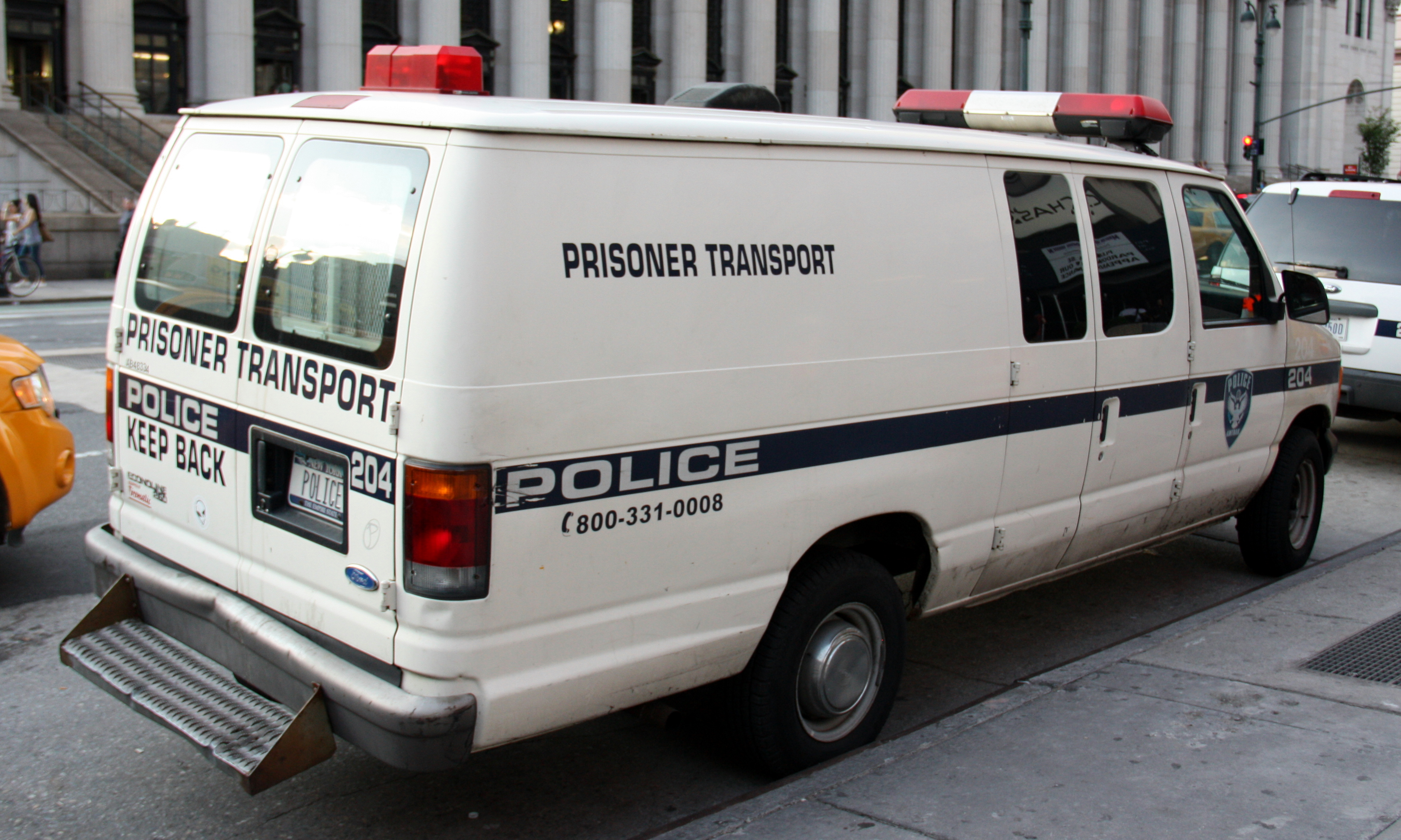
Amtrak Police Department prisoner transport vehicle

On February 8, 2017, Amtrak Police Officer LaRoyce Tankson shot and killed an unarmed man, Chad Robertson, who had been spotted smoking marijuana outside Chicago Union Station and was running from police. The bullet was fired from a distance between 75 and 100 feet (23 and 30 m) and struck Robertson in the shoulder from behind. Tankson's attorney, Will Fahy, claimed Tankson saw Robertson turn and reach for what Tankson thought was a firearm and thus believed he was about to be shot. However, four eyewitnesses stated they did not see Robertson gesture having a gun. Tankson was charged with first degree murder and released from custody after posting ten percent of the US$250,000 (equivalent to about $328,000 in 2025) bail. On March 8, 2017, Amtrak's Fraternal Order of Police lodge claimed having collected more than $4,000 (equivalent to about $5,300 in 2025) to help Tankson, contending that he fired in self-defense. Tankson was acquitted on February 28, 2020.

Reports in 2025 of Amtrak Police targeting and "luring" gay and bisexual men to New York Penn Station bathrooms using gay cruising apps like Sniffies caused controversy. There were further concerns that this surge in lewdness arrests were explicitly targeting the LGBTQ community due to the increase of lewdness arrests in June during Pride Month, targeting of men who displayed rainbow symbols, and even reports that officers were using homophobic language including stating "we got three more fag pervs.” In one case in this series of arrests, Amtrak Police arrested an asylum seeker from Mexico under this lewdness charge scheme and immediately handed him over to Immigration and Customs Enforcement.

== See also ==
- Bahnpolizei – Term in German for the railway police
- British Transport Police – Police force responsible for railways in Britain
- Federal law enforcement in the United States
- Railway Security Guard – Polish police organization
- Transit police – Law enforcement personnel employed by a transit agency
