= Utah Transit Authority Police Department =

Private railroad police department of the Utah Transit Authority

Utah Transit Authority Police Public Safety Department
- Abbreviation: UTA Police

Agency overview
- Formed: 2006

Jurisdictional structure
- Legal jurisdiction: State of Utah
- General nature: Local civilian police
- Specialist jurisdiction: Commuter transit systems and immediate environs, rail, tram, ferry, bus

Operational structure
- Headquarters: Murray
- Parent agency: Utah Transit Authority

Website
- www.rideuta.com/Rider-Info/Public-Safety/Police

The Utah Transit Authority Police Public Safety Department is the law enforcement arm of the Utah Transit Authority (UTA) transit district in northern Utah, United States, with headquarters in Murray. UTA is a public transit district government agency made up of the participating municipalities, counties, and the State of Utah. The UTA Police Department is responsible for law enforcement services, crime investigations, crime prevention, and public safety throughout the light rail, commuter rail and bus transit systems, within the UTA transit district.

== UTA governance ==
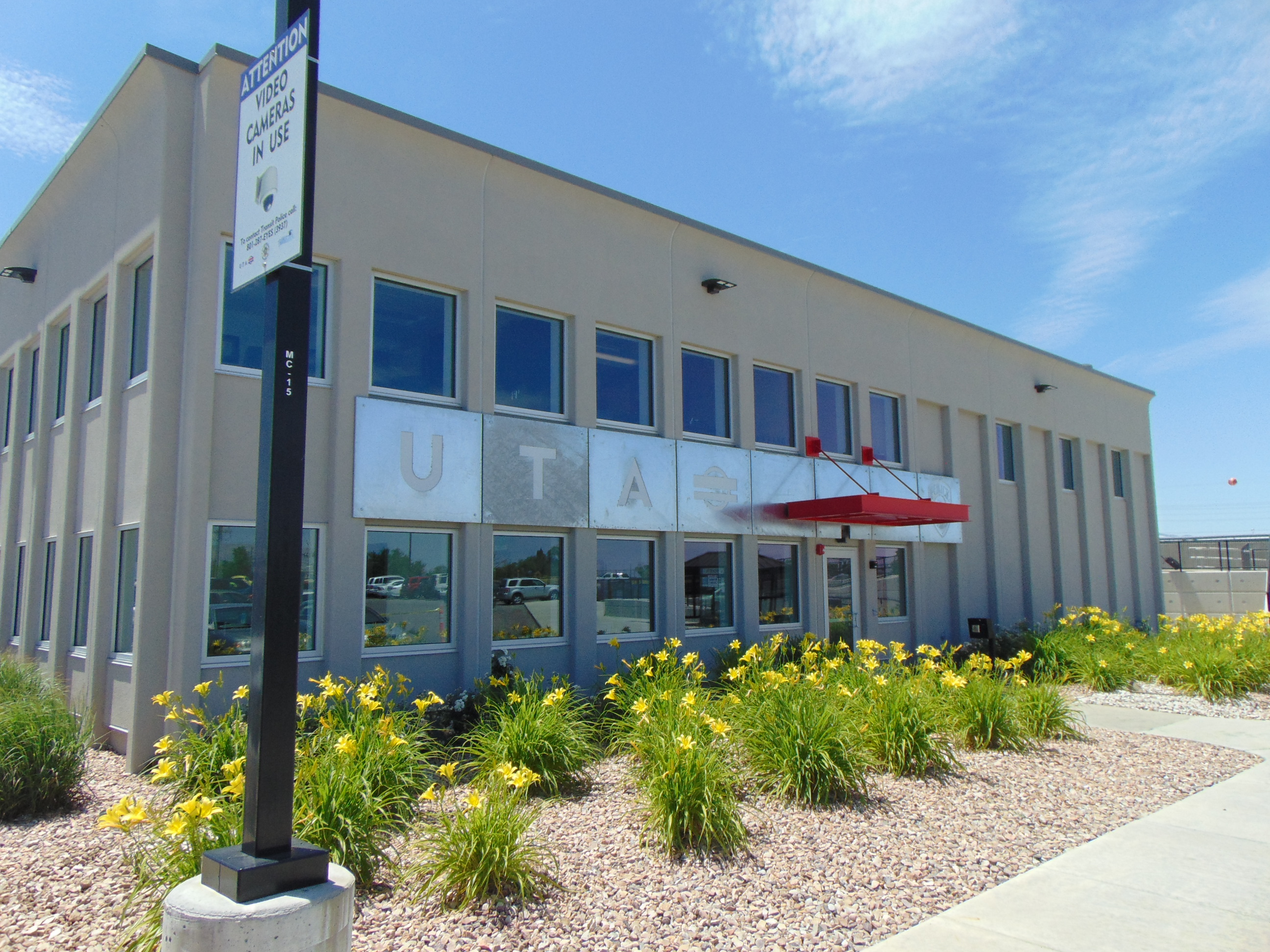
The Utah Transit Authority Police Station in Murray, July 2016

In 1969, the Utah State Legislature passed the Utah Public Transit District Act, which allows individual communities to address transportation needs by forming local transit districts.

UTA was founded in March 1970 when the cities of Murray, Salt Lake City, and Sandy voted to form a transit district. Today, UTA's service area is over 1,400 square miles (3,600 km^{2}) and covers seven counties: Box Elder, Davis, Salt Lake, Summit, Tooele, Utah, and Weber.

Until 2018, UTA was governed by a 15-member part-time Board of Trustees. These trustees were appointed by the city and county governments that fund UTA with a local option sales tax.

Local elected officials were permitted to serve on the UTA Board, and one seat was reserved for a member of the State Transportation Commission, which is part of the Utah Department of Transportation. The President of the Senate, Speaker of the House and Governor of the State of Utah each appointed one seat as well.

In 2018, due to alleged corruption issues, the Utah State Legislature passed a bill organizing UTA with a full-time three-member board appointed by the Utah State Governor.

== History ==
UTA originally contracted with a private company for security services. In 2003, after several attempts, UTA took control of security services and created the UTA Public Safety Department. The UTA security officers were given the title of Transit Public Safety Officers and they were primarily tasked with conducting fare enforcement and observing and reporting crime to local, county, and state law enforcement agencies. Local municipalities, counties, and state police agencies within the transit district were originally responsible for responding to calls for police services throughout the transit system. In 2006, the Utah State Legislature passed a bill, which granted multi-county transit districts the authority to hire and employ police officers to provide law enforcement services. As of June 2021, UTA is the only multi-county transit district in Utah. In 2006, UTA created the UTA Police Department and the Transit Police Officers were granted state certification as law enforcement officers.

== Training ==
UTA Transit Police Officers are certified as law enforcement officers by the Utah Department of Public Safety Peace Officer Standards and Training (POST), and they are required to attend state certified police academies. In addition to completing state police academies, the UTA Transit Police Officers (like all other law enforcement officers in the State of Utah) must receive a minimum of 40 hours of continuous in service training annually, which usually includes legal and policy training, medical and first responder training, firearms and weapons training, defensive tactics, and use of force training.

== Jurisdiction ==
The UTA Police Department's jurisdiction is UTA transit district property and resources, which includes UTA buildings, maintenance and service centers, train stations, bus stops, Park and Ride lots, and any UTA equipment or vehicle. The UTA transit police jurisdiction is also extended onto the right-of-way of train tracks and twenty feet in and around any UTA property or vehicle. The UTA transit district has a large jurisdiction, from Utah County on the south to Box Elder County on the north and from Tooele County on the west to Summit County on the east, with Salt Lake, Davis, and Weber counties in the middle. Although neither Summit County, nor any municipality therein, is a participant in the UTA transit district, UTA transit vehicles do provide service to Park City through a special arrangement with Park City and Summit County.

== Laws and procedures ==
UTA ordinances are primarily enforced by Transit Police Officers, although they can also be enforced by other law enforcement agencies. Violators of UTA ordinances, can be issued civil or criminal citations depending on the violation. UTA civil citations, such as fare evasion, are not criminal and are reviewed and administered by a UTA civil administrator. Criminal charges filed by the UTA Police Department are reviewed and administered by the justice court, district court, or federal court in which the offense occurred. Transit Police Officers have the legal authority as law enforcement officers of the State of Utah, to enforce municipal, county, state, and federal laws outside of their jurisdiction.

== Department command ==
The Utah Transit Authority Police Department is managed by the Public Safety Manager, who is appointed to the position by the UTA General Manager and the board of trustees. The command structure is made up of the Public Safety Manager, captains, lieutenants, sergeants and officers. The UTA Police Department has sworn law enforcement officers and non-sworn support personnel, which includes dispatchers, office personnel, and security officers.

In 2011, UTA considered the possibility of combining its Public Safety Department with the Unified Police Department of Greater Salt Lake, which is headed by the Salt Lake County Sheriff.

== Police services ==
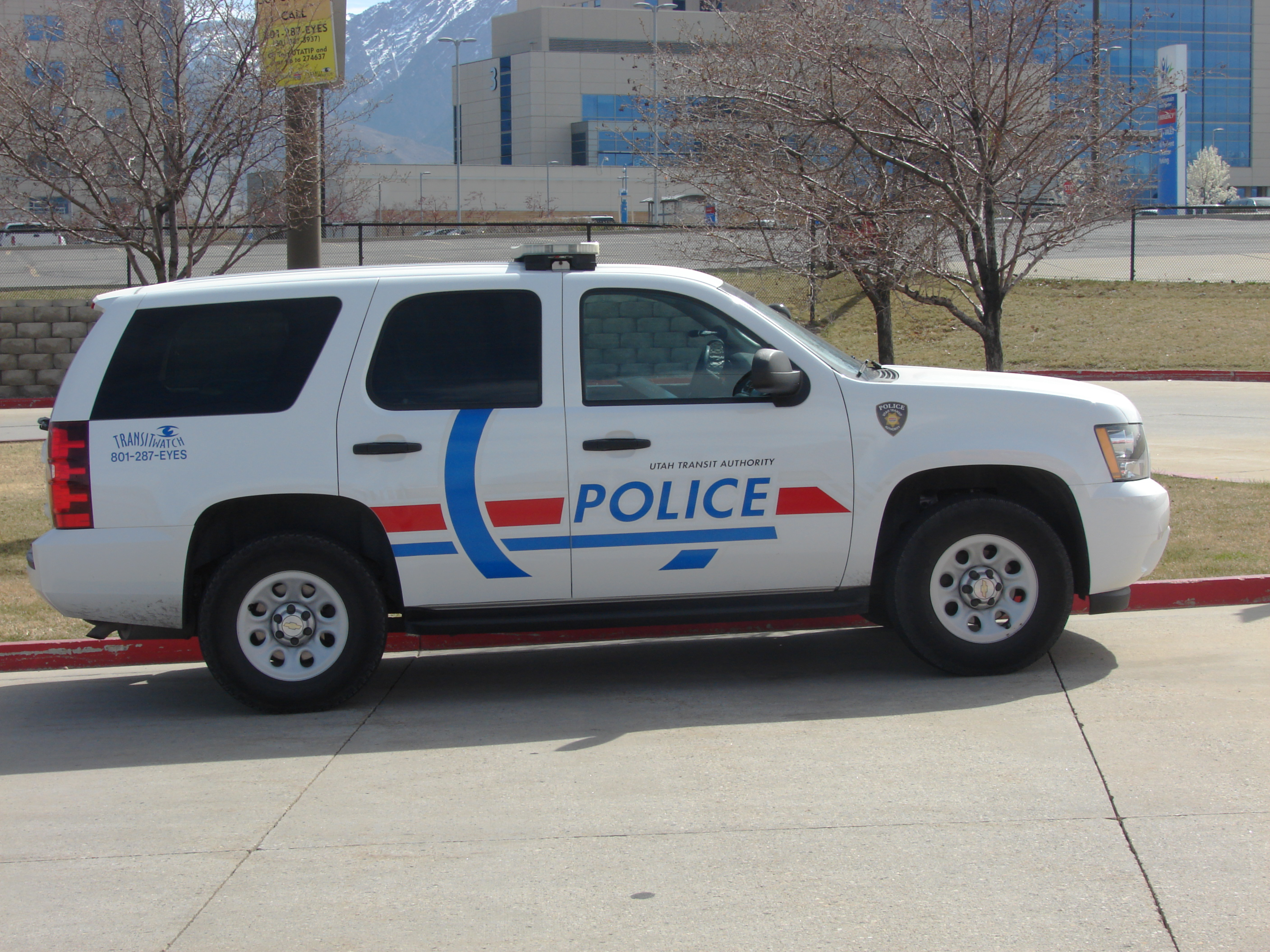
Utah Transit Authority Police vehicle at Murray Central station, March 2015

UTA Transit Police Officers are assigned patrol vehicles, and the department mandates a beat system for them. UTA Transit Police Officers routinely patrol trains, buses, all UTA stations, and UTA rail rights-of-way, as well as conduct fare enforcement. Transit police officers also respond to calls for police services throughout the transit system.

== See also ==
- List of law enforcement agencies in Utah
