= Bahnpolizei =

Term in German for the railway police

Bahnpolizei (German pronunciation: [ˈbaːnpoliˌtsaɪ], lit. 'Railway police') is the term in Germany, Austria, and the German-speaking parts of Switzerland for the railway police.

== Germany ==
Bahnpolizei was the name of the former Railway police of West Germany and fell under the jurisdiction of the Deutsche Bundesbahn federal railway company. Bahnpolizei officers investigated trespassing on rail property, assaults against passengers, terrorism threats targeting the railway, arson, tagging of graffiti on railroad rolling stock or buildings, signal vandalism, pickpocketing, ticket fraud, robbery, and theft of personal belongings, baggage, or freight. They also investigated train/vehicle collisions, and hazardous materials releases.

In 1992, the railway security mission was transferred to the Bundesgrenzschutz which resulted in the merger of the Bahnpolizei into the Federal Border Guard Force. The BGS had already taken on these duties in 1990 for the territory of the former East Germany, replacing the former East German Transportpolizei. The Bundesgrenzschutz was then renamed the Bundespolizei (Federal Police) on July 1, 2005, and this force is currently responsible for security and passenger checks on the German railway system.

== Switzerland ==
Switzerland never had a separate transport police because all rail employees had limited police authority. However, due to the introduction of trains with no conductors in the late 1990s, crime in trains increased and the Swiss Federal Railways rail company trained Bahnpolizei officers for its driver-only commuter trains.

In 2002, the SBB-CFF-FFS merged its Bahnpolizei force with the private security company Securitas AG and the resulting Securitrans is now the force that protects Switzerland's trains, passengers, rail property and rail workers.

Since 2011, the rail police has been reorganised, and the Transport Police of Switzerland (Transportpolizei) are state employees, with all officers attending two years of police academy training with final certification.

Transportpolizei officers are sworn as officers to the Swiss Confederation, and thus have the same power to arrest as any other cantonal police officers. As their state counterparts, they usually carry a SIG Sauer P225 and pepper sprays as weapons, along with handcuffs for restrain options.

== See also ==
- Bahnschutzpolizei Third Reich
