= The Arizona Project =

Collaborative journalism

The Arizona Project is the first large-scale implementation of collaborative journalism, triggered predominately by the murder of Arizona Republic reporter Don Bolles and with the support of the newly established nonprofit organisation Investigative Reporters and Editors, Inc (IRE). In June 1976, Bolles died due to injuries amassed from a targeted car bombing in Phoenix. Bolles' rich investigative history relating to organised crime in Arizona and the rarity of such a murder indicated to working journalists that this attack was a direct response to his investigations. In the wake of Bolles' death, the Investigative Reporters and Editors organisation conceived The Arizona Project as a way to both continue and honour Bolles' investigative work within Arizona on a larger scale.

With then-Newsday editor, Robert W. Greene overseeing the project, over 40 reporters flooded to Arizona – operating independently from the 23 different news organisations they came from – in an attempt to form together and uncover corruptive relationships between politics, business and organised crime within the state. Their research aimed to expose and portray these deep-rooted links in a series of news articles to then be published nationwide, while also functioning as a message meant to reflect the unity of journalists and the consequences of killing a reporter.

The findings were distributed in numerous publications; however, due to various controversies surrounding the project, some newspapers such as The New York Times and The Washington Post avoided the series. Robert Greene described the findings to a CBS reporter, stating they reveal, "that Arizona is facing a massive problem in organised crime," and the 23-part series indeed exposed names and stories regarding corruption, land fraud, and organised crime in the state."

== Background ==
=== Don Bolles ===
Donald Fifield Bolles was raised in Teaneck, New Jersey and graduated Teaneck High School in 1946, after which he completed a degree in government at Beloit College. Following a term in the United States Army in the Korean War, Bolles found a job at the Associated Press and by 1962 was hired by The Arizona Republic newspaper.

By age forty seven, Bolles had carved out a career unearthing corruptive practices within the political sphere as well as exposing organised crime in Arizona. In the fourteen years he worked at the Arizona Republic, "he had uncovered secret political slush funds controlled by the state patrol, bribery of state tax commissioners, land fraud, and Mafia influence in a national sports concession firm, Emprise Corporation." Bolles' investigative work was the catalyst for the Arizona State Legislature commanding Emprise Corporation to divest investments in a number of dog and horse racetracks in 1976. Together with another reporter, Bolles released the names of almost 200 organised crime individuals and their respective ties to legitimate companies in Arizona. Investigative work like this earned Bolles a nomination for a Pulitzer prize as well as an established reputation in the journalistic sphere throughout America, including an honorary award in his name at his former college.

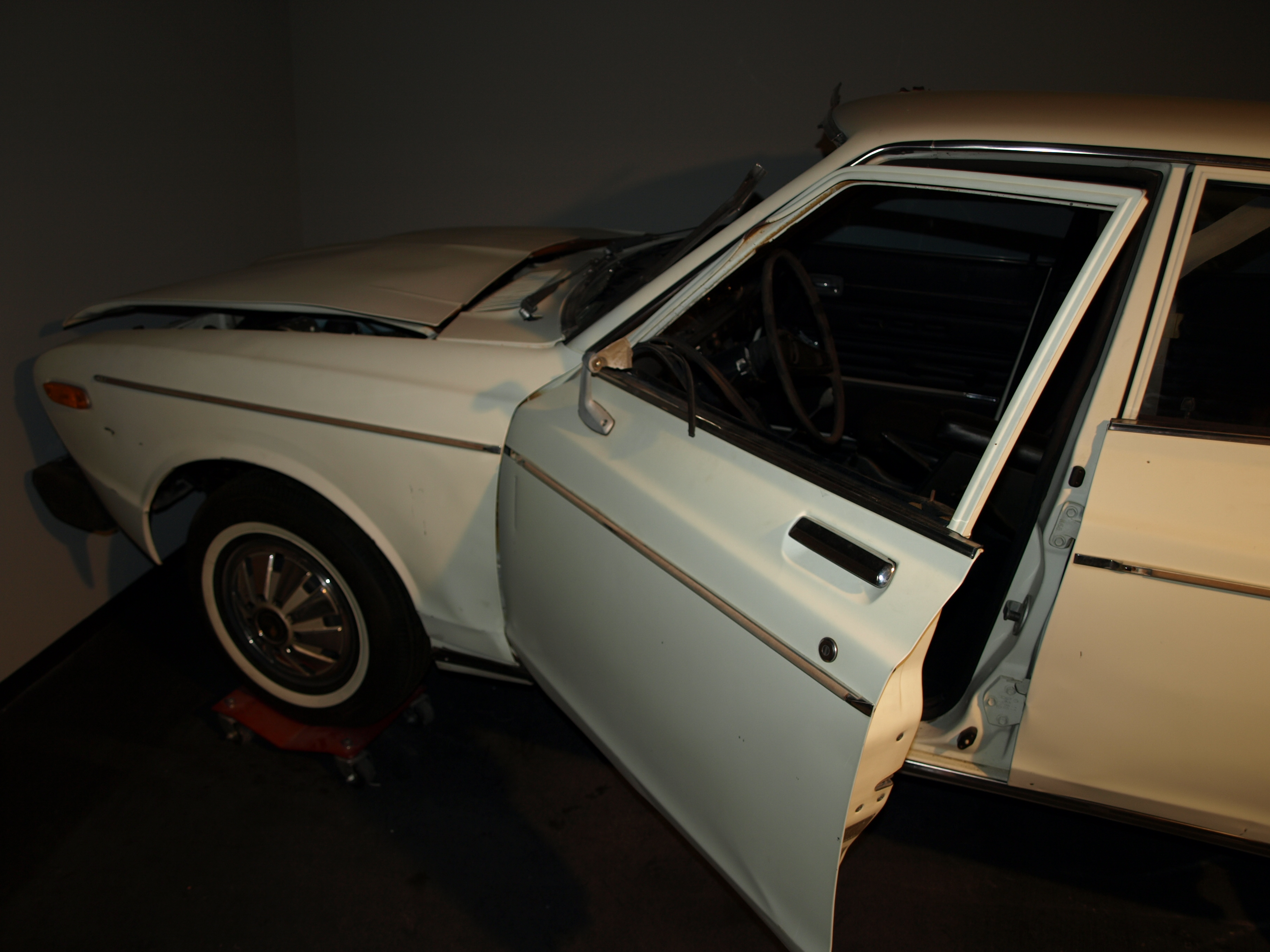
Don Bolles' 1976 Datsun car

Bolles had stopped doing investigative work for various reasons around ten months before he received a phone call on May 27 from a man claiming to have evidence of land fraud schemes implicating the aforementioned Emprise Corporation and well known business and political figures. After speaking briefly, Bolles agreed to meet the man, John Adamson, at 11:25 am on June 2 in the lobby entrance of the Clarendon House hotel in Phoenix. Adamson didn't turn up however, and instead called Bolles to inform him that their meeting was cancelled. Bolles was known to be a cautious man in his investigative days, habitually placing a piece of scotch tape over the front hood of his car so he would know if someone had tampered with his engine. However this wouldn't help Bolles from the six sticks of dynamite that were detonated underneath the vehicle's chassis as he started to pull out of the Phoenix parking lot. As Bolles lay half out the driver's side of the car, bleeding profusely and lapsing in and out of consciousness, he managed to whisper, "They finally got me... Emprise – the Mafia – John Adamson – find him." He died in hospital 11 days later on June 13.

=== Investigative Reporters and Editors, Inc. (IRE) ===
Coincidentally, the newly established IRE had scheduled their first national conference just days after the bombing, and as a result, the meeting was abuzz with different ideas and theories concerning the attack. News of Bolles' murder shocked reporters, "and particularly those of us in the field of investigative reporting," said experienced investigative reporter Clark Mollenhoff. "For years we had proceeded about our business ignoring threats to our lives and our job, more or less assuming that the bosses of organised crime and politics would 'be too smart' to kill a reporter or editor and stir up the whole journalistic community."

The community of journalists were unsurprisingly rattled, projecting fears that subjects of other investigations around the country may be encouraged to act violently toward investigating reporters following the attack on Bolles. After days of discussion, it was decided the best course of action to defend what they considered an assault on press freedom – as well as to signal to the world that reporters could not be muzzled – was to form a team to continue Bolles' work.

Robert Greene was to lead the team on behalf of the IRE, and stated that "the purpose of such an investigation would not have as its direct aim the solution of Bolles' assassination. The point would be to expose the political-land fraud-mob structure of Arizona... For all of us – particularly newspapers with high investigative profiles – this is eminently self-serving. We are buying life insurance for our own reporters."

== The project ==
The project began in October 1976, and emboldened by widespread support was expected to be completed by March 1977. Money for the project was raised from various organisations, philanthropists, citizens and even newsroom staffers around the country, who would donate a portion of their salaries. The final budget was estimated at $150,000.

By January 1977, following extensive research and with overflowing files collated on different individuals and businesses, the Arizona Project team started to write. After only a month, the series was finished – a collection of 23 different articles detailed with photographs and biographies of significant individuals, spanning a total of over 100,000 words that outlined an intricate and deep-rooted web of organised crime and corruption in the state. As per the ideology of collaborative journalism that the team embodied, no one received individual credit for any of the work. Rather, the IRE was credited as the author of each article published across America as numerous news organisations began to distribute the series in March 1977.

=== Findings ===
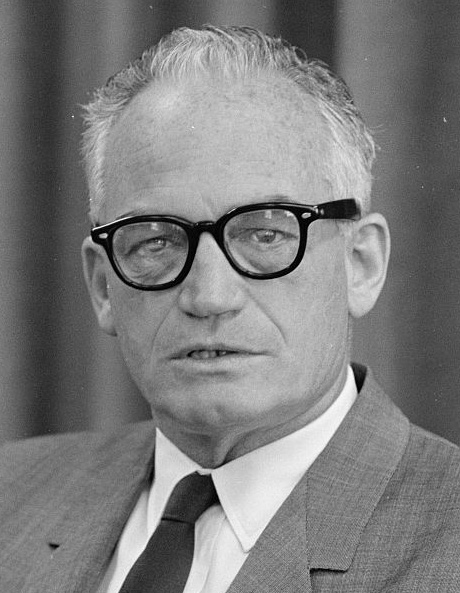
Barry Goldwater

The series was broken down by a number of key themes – including land-development fraud; gambling, prostitution and drug trade; connections between politicians and individuals associated with organised crime; as well as corruption in the legal system – and was led with a story introducing the project and outlining some of the key stories that were to follow. Barry Goldwater, the Senator in Arizona and a 1964 U.S. presidential candidate was a key target throughout the investigation, and many of the articles focused on friends and associates he was involved with. The Goldwater's were quoted stating the IRE reports were, 'ridiculous and untrue', however, his connection to underworld figures was argued to be at the very least the same as 'condoning organised crime'.

The second day of publication outlined the dominance and reach of Barry Goldwater, as well as his involvement and connection to a ranch uncovered to be exploiting illegal alien workers. After a meeting with head of local border patrol, Raymond Feld, IRE reporter, Michael Wendland had learned that Feld's border patrol team was heavily understaffed, and at every request for extra support on raids, the border patrol team would turn up to Arrowhead ranch and find nothing and nobody illegal. Feld later found out spies from the ranch were tipped off to their plans at every stage. However, there was more to the story; every time they would catch and deport illegal aliens from the state, Feld and his team would often find them right back in Arizona not long after. There was an established trade of procuring and smuggling illegal workers, and even with extensive evidence and requested assistance to his superiors, Feld noted that 'they totally ignored it'. Reporters working on the story began to theorise someone higher up was squashing any interest in Arrowhead such as Barry Goldwater, a man of power whose family was a partial owner, allowing a decade of illegal workers to live in subhuman conditions near the Arrowhead ranches. The stories continued to outline ties from members of the Goldwater family and other political figures to individuals associated with organised crime, including Barry's brother, Robert Goldwater. The sixth story revealed Robert's involvement with an associate of American mobster Peter Licavoli and their partnership in the Arizona restaurant chain Hobo Jo's. The IRE exposed the chain as a, 'pipeline for mafia cash', as well as the scandalous details of where the money was going. Over the course of a 21-month period, over $1.5 million was siphoned from the chain to pay for 'wild parties with former playboy bunnies', as well as a $350,000 home for a Mafia associate. Barry Goldwater stated that the reports were, 'totally false,' and Robert called them, 'poppycock'. Articles published on days nine and ten examined Governor of Arizona, Raul Castro and his business linkage to Kemper Marley, a millionaire alcohol distributor implicated in the assassination of Don Bolles by John Adamson, who had been arrested shortly after Bolles died.

Days eleven, twelve and thirteen were centred around Ned Warren Sr. and his various business practices. It was said that he, among others, took advantage of loose regulations and loop holes surrounding land and real estate business, earning himself the nickname the, 'Godfather of land fraud'. Until 1975, he got away virtually untouched, jumping ship from one corporation to the next, while associates often took the brunt of the prosecution. Meeting with IRE reporters during the Arizona Project investigations he stated, 'I was a thief... a good thief'.

The following week of stories set the stage for a first person account from IRE reporters, detailing their cross border travels with drug traffickers and tying together the extent of drug smuggling operations between Arizona and Mexico. The opening line of the 19th story claimed Arizona was, 'rapidly emerging as the most concentrated corridor of narcotics smuggling from Mexico into the United States'. Some of the key findings from the story revealed there to be 23 different major smuggling rings controlled by various crime families throughout America, as well as an estimation that as many as 800 licensed pilots earn a full-time income transporting narcotics from Mexico into Arizona.

The final few stories dealt with organised crime and its corruptive influence on the criminal justice system, highlighting the leniency awarded to high-profile families and prominent individuals.

== Reception ==
Although the series was published in a number of newspapers across America, many significant publications, including Arizona's own, ‘Arizona Republic,’ either completely rejected the series, or ran greatly edited versions. Reception was mixed; many agreed that the investigation brought to light a better understanding of the deep-seated roots of criminal practice throughout Arizona, engendering awareness and propelling action against such corruptive behaviours on a nationwide scale. However others argued that the collaborative journalism technique together with the Bolles-influenced motivation of the Arizona Project encouraged sensationalist reporting and unnecessarily hostile and bias investigation. Other criticism catalysed a debate as to whether the collaborative technique undercut competition in the press, and whether local journalists were better situated to report on their own regions.

Prominent Los Angeles Times news critic David Shaw stated of the project that the stories, were 'vague, unproven, filled with innuendo,’ and, ‘instead of proof, the Arizona team too frequently offered unsubstantiated surmise, syllogistic reasoning and hyperfervid language’

A month after initial publication of the series, a polling service in Phoenix called Behavior Research Center surveyed 1000 households spanning the Rocky Mountains. The results painted a picture of the profound impact the Arizona Project had on residents throughout the area and the report concluded that, ‘Without question, the IRE reports have had a negative impact on the image of Arizona among residents of the Rocky Mountain region.'
