= New Jersey Society for the Prevention of Cruelty to Animals =

- Abbreviation: NJSPCA

Agency overview
- Formed: 1868
- Dissolved: 2018

Jurisdictional structure
- Operations jurisdiction: New Jersey, USA

Operational structure
- Overseen by: Board of Trustees
- Headquarters: New Brunswick, NJ
- Agency executive: Larry Donato, President

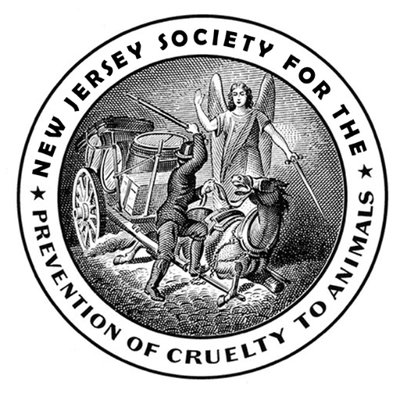

The New Jersey Society for the Prevention of Cruelty to Animals (colloquially, "NJSPCA Humane Police") was an agency that promoted animal welfare, investigated cases of animal cruelty, and enforced animal welfare legislation in New Jersey.

In January 2018, a bill passed to dissolve the organisation and transfer its enforcement powers to other agencies. As a result, the agency ceased enforcement operations by 1 August 2018. The agency then directed its efforts towards fund raising and education on animal care and welfare. However, the agency was disbanded later the same year after a state investigation report revealed mismanagement of funds.

== History ==
The New Jersey Society for the Prevention of Cruelty to Animals (NJSPCA) was created in 1868 to prevent animal cruelty and investigate cases of animal cruelty in New Jersey. The agents of the NJSPCA were established as law enforcement officers in charge of investigating and prosecuting all persons involved in animal abuse and neglect.

The NJSPCA was the second oldest SPCA in the country, after the American Society for the Prevention of Cruelty to Animals in New York.

From 1868 until 2018, the New Jersey Society for the Prevention of Cruelty to Animals focused on humane law enforcement and investigations of animal cruelty throughout New Jersey. The agency was one of just a few law enforcement agencies in the state that had statewide authority. The agency employed both sworn officers that carried firearms, as well as unarmed investigators.

In January 2018, New Jersey Governor Chris Christie signed a bill to dissolve the organization and transfer animal cruelty law enforcement to county prosecutors, municipalities, and county SPCA agencies. As a result, the NJSPCA ceased its law enforcement operations by August 1, 2018. After law enforcement operations stopped, the agency directed its efforts towards fund raising and education on animal care and welfare. However, the agency was disbanded later in 2018 after a State Commission of Investigation Reports (SCI) showed that the agency could not account for over $700K in attorney fees, mismanaged bank accounts, and businesses created by its board members. The agency was virtually bankrupt at the time it was disbanded due to a lack of oversight.

See Sci Report https://www.nj.gov/sci/pdf/SPCA-FollowUpReport.pdf

== Enforcement officers ==
Humane law enforcement officers (abbreviated as "HLEOs" and also known as humane police officers) were sworn officers commissioned by the Superintendent of the New Jersey State Police, having full law enforcement powers and authority in New Jersey. The officers gained their authority through Title 4 of New Jersey statutes, and were permitted and authorised to enforce any law or ordinance enacted for the protection of animals. HLEOs carried and used firearms, batons, pepper spray, and handcuffs. They could use physical, less lethal, and deadly force, conduct investigations and surveillance for animal cruelty cases, sign complaints and issue summonses for criminal charges and/or civil violations, confiscate and seize animals, and make arrests with or without warrant for violations of the animal cruelty laws under NJ Title 4.

Humane law enforcement officers and agents were required to complete basic police training at an accredited NJ police academy. Agents and officers also received training in Title 4 law, self-defense tactics, usage of baton and pepper spray, investigations, seizing animals, emergency vehicle operations, and report writing. Humane law enforcement officers received training in handcuffing techniques and firearms as well. Training was provided by the NJSPCA, the New Jersey State Police, the New Jersey Division of Criminal Justice (DCJ), and various police academies in the state.

== Vehicles and equipment ==
The NJSPCA had various vehicles in its fleet including Ford Crown Victoria Police Interceptors, Chevrolet Express vans, a trailer converted into a mobile command center, and a former army truck. The vehicles were equipped with poles and cages for seizures and catches.

== Rank structure ==
There were eight titles (referred to as ranks) in the New Jersey Society for the Prevention of Cruelty to Animals:

| Title | Insignia |
|---|---|
| Colonel / Superintendent | |
| Major / Deputy Chief | |
| Captain | |
| Lieutenant | |
| Sergeant | |
| Corporal | |
| Humane Law Enforcement Officer | |
| Humane Law Enforcement Investigator | |
| Humane Law Enforcement Agent | |

== See also ==
- American Society for the Prevention of Cruelty to Animals
- List of law enforcement agencies in New Jersey
