= New Jersey State Detectives =

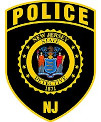
- New Jersey State Detective Patch
- Common name: State Detectives
- Abbreviation: NJSD

Agency overview
- Formed: 1871
- Employees: 25

Jurisdictional structure
- Operations jurisdiction: New Jersey, USA
- Legal jurisdiction: New Jersey
- Governing body: NJDA
- General nature: Civilian police

Operational structure
- Agency executive: John A. D’Angelo, Chief

Website
- New Jersey State Detectives Website

The New Jersey State Detectives are commissioned by the Governor of New Jersey as police detectives with statewide jurisdiction. All are members of the historic New Jersey Detective Agency (also referred to as the New Jersey State Detective Agency), a body politic created by the New Jersey Legislature in 1871. Current members come from the ranks of federal, state, county and municipal law enforcement agencies, with some having specialized training and experience in many facets of law enforcement including firearms, narcotics, sex crimes, arson, organized crime and street gang investigations.

Membership requirements for applicants to the agency include a minimum of ten years full-time law enforcement experience with a federal, state, county or municipal agency involved in policing or criminal investigation. Additionally, candidates must possess a four-year degree from an accredited college or university with a law or criminal justice major, pass a medical examination, drug screening test and undergo a thorough background investigation. They must also receive firearms training and must qualify in accordance with the guidelines established by the New Jersey Attorney General's Office.

The mission of the NJDA and its State Detectives is to serve the law enforcement community by providing access to the experience, education and assistance of its members through one centralized organization. This assistance is designed to be available in times of disaster or in any emergency where the health, safety and welfare of the citizens of New Jersey are threatened.

In 1997 the organization was said to be 'trouble ... "Wannabe cops" and "A tragedy waiting to happen"', because "more than half have no police training", "most" had no gun permits, and their accountability was unclear.

== See also ==
- List of law enforcement agencies in New Jersey
- New Jersey State Police
- State Bureau of Investigation
