= List of law enforcement agencies in New Jersey =

The Flag of New Jersey

This is a list of law enforcement agencies in the state of New Jersey.

According to the US Bureau of Justice Statistics' 2018 Census of State and Local Law Enforcement Agencies, the state had 507 law enforcement agencies employing 30,261 sworn police officers, about 341 for each 100,000 residents.

== State agencies ==
- New Jersey Office of the Attorney General
  - Department of Law and Public Safety
    - Division of Alcoholic Beverage Control
    - Division of Consumer Affairs
    - Division of Criminal Justice
    - Division of Law
    - Division of Gaming Enforcement
    - Juvenile Justice Commission
    - New Jersey State Police
- New Jersey Department of Corrections
- New Jersey Department of Environmental Protection
  - Division of Fish and Wildlife
    - Bureau of Law Enforcement (State Conservation Officers)
  - Division of Parks and Forestry
    - New Jersey State Park Police
- New Jersey Department of Human Services Police
- New Jersey Department of the Treasury
  - Division of Taxation
    - Office of Criminal Investigation
- New Jersey Office of Homeland Security and Preparedness
- New Jersey State Detective Agency
- New Jersey Election Law Enforcement Commission
- New Jersey State Parole Board
  - Division of Parole (State Parole Officers)
- New Jersey Transit Police Department

== County Prosecutor's Office ==
- Atlantic County Prosecutor's Office
- Bergen County Prosecutor's Office
- Burlington County Prosecutor's Office
- Camden County Prosecutor's Office
- Cape May County Prosecutor's Office
- Cumberland County Prosecutor's Office
- Essex County Prosecutor's Office
- Gloucester County Prosecutor's Office
- Hudson County Prosecutor's Office
- Hunterdon County Prosecutor's Office
- Mercer County Prosecutor's Office
- Middlesex County Prosecutor's Office
- Monmouth County Prosecutor's Office
- Morris County Prosecutor's Office []
- Ocean County Prosecutor's Office
- Passaic County Prosecutor's Office
- Salem County Prosecutor's Office
- Somerset County Prosecutor's Office
- Sussex County Prosecutor's Office
- Union County Prosecutor's Office
- Warren County Prosecutor's Office

== County agencies ==
- Atlantic County Sheriff's Office
- Bergen County Sheriff's Office
- Burlington County Sheriff's Department Sheriff's Office | Burlington County, NJ - Official Website
- Camden County Sheriff's Office Home Page | My Site
- Camden County Police Department
- Cape May County Sheriff's Office
- Cumberland County Sheriff's Department
- Essex County Sheriff's Office
- Gloucester County Sheriff's Office
- Hudson County Sheriff's Office
- Hunterdon County Sheriff's Office
- Mercer County Sheriff's Office
- Middlesex County Sheriff's Department
- Monmouth County Sheriff's Office
- Morris County Sheriff's Office
- Morris County Park Police
- Ocean County Sheriff's Department
- Passaic County Sheriff's Department
- Salem County Sheriff's Office
- Somerset County Sheriff's Office
- Sussex County Sheriff's Office
- Union County Sheriff's Office
- Union County Police Department
- Warren County Sheriff's Office

== Corrections agencies ==
- New Jersey Department of Corrections
- Atlantic County Department of Public Safety
- Bergen County Corrections Division
- Burlington County Department of Corrections
- Camden County Department of Corrections
- Cape May County Correction Center
- Cumberland County Department of Corrections
- Essex County Department of Corrections
- Gloucester County Department of Corrections
- Hudson County Department of Corrections
- Hunterdon County Department of Corrections
- Mercer County Corrections Center
- Middlesex County Adult Corrections
- Monmouth County Department of Corrections
- Morris County Corrections
- Ocean County Department of Corrections
- Passaic County Sheriff's Department Bureau of Corrections
- Salem County Correctional Facility
- Somerset County Corrections
- Sussex County Sheriff's Department Jail
- Union County Division of Correctional Services
- Warren County Corrections

== Municipal agencies ==
- Aberdeen Township Police Department
- Absecon Police Department
- Allendale Police Department
- Allenhurst Police Department
- Allentown Police Department
- Alpine Police Department
- Andover Township Police Department
- Asbury Park Police Department
- Atlantic City Police Department
- Atlantic Highlands Police Department
- Audubon Police Department
- Avalon Police Department
- Avon By The Sea Police Department
- Barnegat Township Police Department
- Barrington Police Department
- Bay Head Police Department
- Bayonne Police Department
- Beach Haven Police Department
- Beachwood Police Department
- Bedminster Police Department
- Belleville Police Department
- Bellmawr Police Department
- Belmar Police Department
- Belvidere Police Department
- Bergenfield Police Department
- Berkeley Heights Police Department
- Berkeley Township Police Department
- Berlin Township Police Department
- Benards Township Police Department
- Benardsville Police Department
- Beverly Police Department
- Blairstown Police Department
- Bloomfield Police Department
- Bloomingdale Police Department
- Bogota Police Department
- Boonton Police Department
- Boonton Township Police Department
- Bordentown Police Department
- Bordentown Township Police Department
- Bound Brook Police Department
- Bradley Beach Police Department
- Branchburg Police Department
- Brick Township Police Department
- Bridgeton Police Department
- Bridgewater Township Police Department Home
- Brielle Police Department
- Brigantine Police Department
- Brooklawn Police Department
- Burlington Police Department
- Burlington Township Police Department
- Butler Police Department
- Byram Township Police Department
- Caldwell Police Department
- Cape May Police Department
- Carlstadt Police Department
- Carneys Point Township Police Department
- Carteret Police Department
- Cedar Grove Police Department
- Chatham Borough Police Department
- Chatham Township Police Department
- Cherry Hill Police Department
- Chesilhurst Police Department
- Chester Borough Police Department
- Chester Township Police Department
- Chesterfield Township Police Department
- Cinnaminson Township Police Department
- Clark Police Department
- Clayton Police Department
- Clementon Police Department
- Cliffside Park Police Department
- Clifton Police Department
- Clinton Police Department
- Clinton Township Police Department
- Closter Police Department
- Collingswood Police Department
- Colts Neck Township Police Department
- Cranbury Police Department
- Cranford Police Department
- Cresskill Police Department
- Deal Police Department
- Delanco Township Police Department
- Delaware Township Police Department |
- Delran Township Police Department
- Demarest Police Department
- Denville Township Police Department
- Deptford Township Police Department
- Dover Police Department
- Dumont Police Department
- Dunellen Police Department
- East Brunswick Police Department
- East Greenwich Township Police Department
- East Hanover Township Police Department
- East Orange Police Department
- East Rutherford Police Department
- East Windsor Police Department
- Easthampton Township Police Department
- Eatontown Police Department
- Edgewater Police Department
- Edgewater Park Police Department
- Edison Police Department
- Egg Harbor City Police Department
- Egg Harbor Township Police Department
- Elizabeth Police Department
- Elk Township Police Department
- Elmer Police Department
- Elmwood Park Police Department
- Emerson Police Department
- Englewood Police Department
- Englewood Cliffs Police Department
- Englishtown Police Department
- Essex Fells Police Department
- Evesham Township Police Department
- Ewing Township Police Department
- Fair Haven Police Department
- Fair Lawn Police Department
- Fairfield Township Police Department
- Fairview Police Department
- Fanwood Police Department
- Far Hills Police Department
- Fieldsboro Police Department
- Flemington Police Department
- Florence Township Police Department
- Florham Park Police Department
- Fort Lee Police Department
- Franklin Police Department
- Franklin Lakes Police Department
- Franklin Township Police Department (Gloucester County)
- Franklin Township Police Department (Somerset County)
- Freehold Borough Police Department
- Freehold Township Police Department
- Frenchtown Police Department
- Galloway Township Police Department
- Garfield Police Department
- Garwood Police Department
- Gibbsboro Police Department
- Glassboro Police Department
- Glen Ridge Police Department
- Glen Rock Police Department
- Gloucester City Police Department
- Gloucester Township Police Department
- Green Brook Township Police Department
- Greenwich Township Police Department
- Guttenberg Police Department
- Hackensack Police Department
- Hackettstown Police Department
- Haddon Heights Police Department
- Haddon Township Police Department
- Haddonfield Police Department
- Haledon Police Department
- Hamburg Police Department
- Hamilton Township Police Department (Atlantic County)
- Hamilton Township Police Department (Mercer County)
- Hammonton Police Department
- Hanover Township Police Department
- Harding Township Police Department
- Hardyston Township Police Department
- Harrington Park Police Department
- Harrison Police Department
- Harrison Township Police Department
- Harvey Cedars Police Department
- Hasbrouck Heights Police Department HHPD
- Haworth Police Department
- Hawthorne Police Department
- Hazlet Police Department
- Helmetta Police Department
- Hi-Nella Police Department
- High Bridge Police Department
- Highland Park Police Department
- Highlands Police Department
- Hightstown Police Department
- Hillsborough Township Police Department
- Hillsdale Police Department
- Hillside Police Department
- Ho-Ho-Kus Police Department
- Hoboken Police Department
- Holland Township Police Department
- Holmdel Township Police Department
- Hopatcong Police Department
- Hopewell Township Police Department
- Howell Township Police Department
- Irvington Township Police Department
- Island Heights Police Department
- Jackson Township Police Department
- Jamesburg Police Department
- Jefferson Township Police Department
- Jersey City Police Department
- Keansburg Police Department
- Kearny Police Department
- Kenilworth Police Department
- Keyport Police Department
- Kinnelon Police Department
- Lacey Township Police Department
- Lake Como Police Department
- Lakehurst Police Department
- Lakewood Township Police Department
- Lambertville Police Department
- Laurel Springs Police Department
- Lavallete Police Department
- Lawnside Police Department
- Lawrence Township Police Department
- Lebanon Township Police Department
- Leonia Police Department
- Lincoln Park Police Department
- Linden Police Department
- Lindenwold Police Department
- Linwood Police Department
- Little Egg Harbor Township Police Department
- Little Falls Township Police Department
- Little Ferry Police Department
- Little Silver Police Department
- Livingston Police Department
- Lodi Police Department
- Logan Township Police Department
- Long Beach Township Police Department
- Long Branch Police Department
- Long Hill Township Police Department
- Longport Police Department
- Lopatcong Township Police Department
- Lower Township Police Department
- Lumberton Police Department
- Lyndhurst Police Department
- Madison Police Department
- Magnolia Police Department
- Mahwah Police Department
- Manalapan Township Police Department)
- Manasquan Police Department
- Mansfield Township Police Department (Burlington County)
- Mansfield Township Police Department (Warren County)
- Mantoloking Police Department
- Mantua Township Police Department
- Manville Police Department
- Maple Shade Township Police Department
- Maplewood Police Department
- Margate City Police Department
- Marlboro Township Police Department
- Matawan Police Department
- Maywood Police Department
- Medford Police Department
- Medford Lakes Police Department
- Mendham Borough Police Department
- Mendham Township Police Department
- Merchantville Police Department
- Metuchen Police Department
- Middle Township Police Department
- Middlesex Police Department
- Middletown Township Police Department
- Midland Park Police Department
- Millburn Police Department
- Milltown Police Department
- Millville Police Department
- Monmouth Beach Police Department
- Monroe Township Police Department (Gloucester County)
- Monroe Township Police Department (Middlesex County)
- Montclair Police Department
- Montgomery Township Police Department
- Montvale Police Department
- Montville Police Department
- Moonachie Police Department
- Moorestown Police Department
- Morris Plains Police Department
- Morris Township Police Department
- Morristown Police Department
- Mount Arlington Police Department
- Mount Ephraim Police Department
- Mount Holly Police Department
- Mount Laurel Police Department
- Mount Olive Township Police Department
- Mountain Lakes Police Department
- Mountainside Police Department
- Mullica Township Police Department
- Neptune City Police Department
- Neptune Township Police Department
- Netcong Police Department
- New Brunswick Police Department
- New Hanover Township Police Department
- New Milford Police Department
- New Providence Police Department
- Newark Police Department
- Newfield Police Department
- Newton Police Department
- North Arlington Police Department
- North Bergen Police Department
- North Brunswick Police Department
- North Caldwell Police Department
- North Haledon Police Department
- North Hanover Township Police Department
- North Plainfield Police Department
- North Wildwood Police Department
- Northfield Police Department
- Northvale Police Department
- Norwood Police Department
- Nutley Police Department
- Oakland Police Department
- Oaklyn Police Department
- Ocean City Police Department
- Ocean Gate Police Department
- Ocean Township Police Department
- Oceanport Police Department
- Ogdensburg Police Department
- Old Bridge Police Department
- Old Tappan Police Department
- Oradell Police Department
- Orange Police Department
- Oxford Township Police Department
- Palisades Park Police Department
- Palmyra Police Department
- Paramus Police Department
- Park Ridge Police Department
- Parsippany-Troy Hills Police Department
- Passaic Police Department
- Paterson Police Department
- Paulsboro Police Department
- Peapack-Gladstone Police Department
- Pemberton Police Department
- Pemberton Township Police Department
- Pennington Police Department
- Penns Grove Police Department
- Pennsauken Township Police Department
- Pennsville Township Police Department
- Pequannock Township Police Department
- Perth Amboy Police Department
- Phillipsburg Police Department
- Picatinny Police Department
- Pine Beach Police Department
- Pine Hill Police Department
- Pine Valley Police Department
- Piscataway Police Department
- Pitman Police Department
- Plainfield Police Department
- Plainsboro Township Police Department
- Pleasantville Police Department
- Plumsted Township Police Department
- Pohatcong Township Police Department
- Point Pleasant Police Department
- Point Pleasant Beach Police Department
- Pompton Lakes Police Department
- Princeton Police Department
- Prospect Park Police Department
- Rahway Police Department
- Ramsey Police Department
- Randolph Police Department
- Raritan Police Department
- Raritan Township Police Department
- Readington Township Police Department
- Red Bank Police Department
- Ridgefield Police Department
- Ridgefield Park Police Department
- Ridgewood Police Department
- Ringwood Police Department
- River Edge Police Department
- River Vale Police Department
- Riverdale Police Department
- Riverside Township Police Department
- Riverton Police Department
- Robbinsville Police Department
- Rochelle Park Police Department
- Rockaway Police Department
- Rockaway Township Police Department
- Roseland Police Department
- Roselle Police Department
- Roselle Park Police Department
- Roxbury Police Department
- Rumson Police Department
- Runnemede Police Department
- Rutherford Police Department
- Saddle Brook Police Department
- Saddle River Police Department
- Salem Police Department
- Sayreville Police Department
- Scotch Plains Police Department
- Sea Bright Police Department
- Sea Girt Police Department
- Sea Isle City Police Department
- Seaside Heights Police Department
- Seaside Park Police Department
- Secaucus Police Department
- Ship Bottom Police Department
- Shrewsbury Police Department
- Somerdale Police Department
- Somers Point Police Department
- Somerville Police Department
- South Amboy Police Department
- South Bound Brook Police Department
- South Brunswick Police Department
- South Hackensack Police Department
- South Harrison Township Police Department
- South Orange Police Department
- South Plainfield Police Department
- South River Police Department
- South Toms River Police Department
- Sparta Police Department
- Spotswood Police Department
- Spring Lake Police Department
- Spring Lake Heights Police Department
- Springfield Township Police Department (Burlington County)
- Springfield Township Police Department (Union County)
- Stafford Township Police Department
- Stanhope Police Department
- Stillwater Township Police Department
- Stone Harbor Police Department
- Summit Police Department
- Surf City Police Department
- Swedesboro Police Department
- Teaneck Police Department
- Tenafly Police Department
- Tewksbury Township Police Department
- Toms River Police Department
- Totowa Police Department
- Trenton Police Department
- Tuckerton Police Department
- Union Beach Police Department
- Union City Police Department
- Union Township Police Department
- Upper Saddle River Police Department
- Ventnor City Police Department
- Vernon Township Police Department
- Verona Police Department
- Vineland Police Department
- Voorhees Township Police Department
- Waldwick Police Department
- Wall Township Police Department
- Wallington Police Department
- Wanaque Police Department
- Warren Township Police Department
- Washington Police Department
- Washington Township Police Department (Gloucester County)
- Washington Township Police Department (Warren County)
- Watchung Police Department
- Waterford Township Police Department
- Wayne Police Department
- Weehawken Police Department
- Wenonah Police Department
- West Amwell Township Police Department
- West Caldwell Police Department
- West Deptford Township Police Department
- West Long Branch Police Department
- West Milford Police Department
- West New York Police Department
- West Orange Police Department
- West Wildwood Police Department
- West Windsor Police Department
- Westfield Police Department
- Westville Police Department
- Westwood Police Department
- Wharton Police Department
- Wildwood Police Department
- Wildwood Crest Police Department
- Willingboro Township Police Department
- Winfield Township Police Department
- Winslow Township Police Department
- Wood-Ridge Police Department
- Woodbridge Township Police Department
- Woodbury Police Department
- Woodbury Heights Police Department
- Woodcliff Lake Police Department
- Woodland Park Police Department
- Woodlynne Police Department
- Woodstown Police Department
- Woolwich Township Police Department
- Wyckoff Police Department

== College and University, K-12 agencies ==
- Cherry Hill Campus Department of Public Safety
- Burlington County College Department of Public Safety
- Brookdale Community College Police Department
- College of New Jersey Police Department
- Drew University Department of Public Safety
- Essex County College Police Department
- Fairleigh Dickinson University Department of Public Safety
- Kean University Department of Public Safety and Police
- Middlesex County College Police Department
- Monmouth University Police Department
- Montclair State University Police Department
- New Jersey Institute of Technology Police Department
- Princeton University Department of Public Safety
- Stockton University Police Department
- Rowan University Department of Public Safety
- Richard Stockton College Police Department
- Rutgers University Police Department
- Stevens Institute of Technology Police Department
- William Paterson University Office of Public Safety

== Park police agencies ==
- Hunterdon County Park Rangers
- New Jersey State Park Police
- Monmouth County Park Rangers

== Humane law enforcement agencies ==
- Atlantic County SPCA Humane Police
- Bergen County SPCA Law Enforcement Division
- Monmouth County SPCA Humane Police
- Passaic County SPCA Humane Police
- Somerset County SPCA Humane Police

== Interstate police agencies ==
- Burlington County Bridge Commission Police Department
- Delaware River Port Authority Police Department
- Delaware River and Bay Authority Police Department
- Delaware River Joint Toll Bridge Commission
- New York-New Jersey Regional Fugitive Task Force
- Palisades Interstate Parkway Police Department
- Port Authority of New York and New Jersey Police Department

== Railroad police agencies operating within New Jersey ==
- Amtrak Police Department
- CSX Transportation Police Department
- Conrail Police Department (CSAO)
- Morristown & Erie Railroad Police Department
- New Jersey Transit Police Department
- New York-New Jersey Cross Harbor Railroad Police Department
- New York, Susquehanna and Western Railway Police Department
- Norfolk Southern Railway Police Department
- SEPTA Police

== Federal law enforcement agencies operating within New Jersey ==
- United States Park Police
- United States Department of Justice
- National Park Service Ranger (Law Enforcement)
- United States Fish and Wildlife Service
- United States Coast Guard
- Office of the United States Marshal for the District of New Jersey
- Homeland Security Investigations (HSI)
- United States Secret Service
- Federal Bureau of Investigation
  - FBI Police
- Federal Bureau of Prisons
- Federal Reserve Police
- United States Postal Police
- United States Immigration and Customs Enforcement
- United States Customs and Border Protection
- United States Department of Veterans Affairs Police
- Transportation Security Administration
- United States Department of Agriculture - Office of the Inspector General
- Department of Defense Police

== Defunct agencies ==
- Audubon Park Police Department
- Bergen County Police Department (disbanded in 2021, Merged into Bergen County Sheriff's Office)
- Burlington County SPCA Humane Police (disbanded in 2018)
- Camden Police Department (disbanded in 2013, Replaced by Camden County Police Department)
- Port Authority Transit Corporation (PATCO) Police Department (merged into the existing Delaware River Port Authority Police Department)
- Camden County Park Police
- Essex County Police Department (disbanded in September 2006, Merged into Essex County Sheriff's Office)
- Helmetta Police (disbanded in 2018)
- Hudson County Police Department
- New Jersey State SPCA Humane Police
- Lake Como Police Department (disbanded May 2016)
- Middlesex County Park Police (Replaced by County Park Rangers)
- National Park Police (disbanded in 2008)
- Passaic County Park Police
- Wanaque Reservoir Police Department (disbanded 1999)
- West Cape May Police (disbanded in 2001)
