= Investigative Reporters and Editors =

U.S. nonprofit investigative journalism group

IRE
- Investigative Reporters and Editors, Inc.
- Formation: 1975
- Type: 501(c)(3) organization
- Tax ID no.: 51-0166741
- Purpose: Foster excellence in investigative journalism, which is essential to a free society.
- Headquarters: Columbia, Missouri
- Location: Columbia, MO, United States
- Fields: Journalism
- Executive Director: Jonathan Kealing
- Board of directors: Josh Hinkle, President; Cindy Galli, Vice President; Alejandra Cancino, Treasurer; Jodie Fleischer, Secretary; Caresse Jackman, At-Large; Ashley Graham; Kate Howard; Aaron Kessler; Andrew Lehren; Ana Ley; Brian Rosenthal; Paroma Soni; Katie Wilcox
- Website: www.ire.org

Investigative Reporters and Editors, Inc. (IRE) is an American nonprofit organization that focuses on improving the quality of journalism, in particular investigative journalism. Formed in 1975, it presents the IRE Awards and holds conferences and training classes for journalists. Its headquarters is in Columbia, Missouri, at the Missouri School of Journalism. It is the largest and oldest association of investigative journalists in the world.

Programs of IRE include the National Institute for Computer-Assisted Reporting, which aims to foster excellence in data journalism.

== History ==
=== Beginnings ===
After the resignation by President Nixon, 11 journalists met in Reston, Virginia. These journalists hoped, after they conducted investigative journalism during the 1960s and 1970s, to create a national association that could help journalists produce best practices in the craft. It was in that meeting that Investigative Reporters and Editors, Inc. was founded. A grant of $3,100 from the Lilly Endowment of Indianapolis paid the expenses for the meeting.

During debate over what to call the organization, Les Whitten, one of the journalists attending the meeting, pointed out that a defining characteristic of investigative journalists was a sense of outrage. Someone in the meeting grabbed a dictionary to find synonyms of “outrage” and came up with “ire,” which would work as an acronym for "Investigative Reporters and Editors Group".

The meeting also debated who should and should not be allowed in the upcoming organization. Some of the journalists gathered suggested restricting membership to add prestige to the organization, while others suggested a more open organization to investigative journalists and editors, so even inexperienced journalists could get help from IRE. In the end, the journalists decided for openness. Later in March 1975, writing in a trade magazine to publicize the new organization, Harley Bierce of the Indianapolis Star emphasized that the organization would provide services to any reporter needing assistance on an investigative story. “We want to stress that this won’t be an exclusive organization,” he wrote. “Good reporters naturally fall into this classification [of investigative reporter]."

=== First meeting ===
After the meeting, a steering committee was created, charged in exploring interest in a national organization for investigative journalism, and to plan a national conference. An executive committee was also formed, composed of Robert Pierce, Ronald Koziol, Paul Williams, Myrta Pulliam, Harley Bierce, Edward O. DeLaney, and Robert Friedly.

IRE was in a delicate position to ask for funds and grants, since journalists investigate companies and even foundations. IRE initially accepted money from the Lilly Endowment, created by the founders of Eli Lilly and Company, a pharmaceutical company. The initial gathering of funds, IRE hoped, would finance 250 journalists and editors to the first national conference of IRE. After a lot of successes and failures in seeking funds, IRE funds attained to more than USD 18,000, but far from the funds needed to financially support financially the journalists and editors of the first conference. The first national conference also had journalists criticizing IRE for taking grants from foundations such as Lilly, and from news publications, because these publications were sometimes restricting funds to their own investigative journalists. IRE initially decided to take funds only from educational and research foundations and foundations "which owe their existence to journalistic enterprise". The organization later decided to accept more types of gifts.

The first national conference of IRE was held between June 18–20, 1976, in Indianapolis. More than 300 people attended, including approximately 200 paying participants from 35 states, 30 speakers and 40 students. Workshop topics included the state of the art of investigative journalism, how to manage an investigation, how to work as a team, how to report specific topics such as crime, and how to deal with legal and ethical issues in investigative reporting. The members of IRE also voted to seek funds to establish a resource center at Ohio State University by July 1, 1977. Members also voted for a resolution that called for journalists, editors, and news agencies to end their associations with the Central Intelligence Agency (CIA), the Federal Bureau of Investigation (FBI), or other law enforcement agencies to maintain "American journalistic independence". The members also voted to establish an ethics committee "responsible for raising in a continuing way the ethical questions which confront journalists" and to be "responsible for examining the assumptions that underlie" investigative journalism. The members also voted to establish a committee of broadcast journalists to advise the board of directors of IRE about problems specific to broadcast investigations.

=== The location of IRE's headquarters ===
Paul Williams' death in 1976 caused the first dilemma of IRE. Williams had connections to Ohio State University, being a professor there, and had established a working relationship between IRE and the university. The executive committee then decided to find another university for their resource center. In 1978, two proposals came to the IRE board of directors: one from Boston University, and one from the University of Missouri School of Journalism. Although the board initially favored Boston, University of Missouri School of Journalism Dean Roy M. Fisher stressed his school's tradition in journalism. The Missouri's proposal also offered free clipping services for IRE, pay the salaries of office staff members, and help IRE with fundraising. In the end, in June 1978, a meeting in Denver by the members of IRE decided unanimously for the University of Missouri.

=== IRE'S headquarters at Missouri School of Journalism ===
From 1976 and 1980, the Resource Center was established in the University of Missouri School of Journalism, hired a permanent staff, founded a publication (IRE Journal), held annual and regional conferences, set up an annual awards program, and adopted a definition of investigative journalism.

=== The Arizona Project ===
In 1976, one of the members, Don Bolles of the Arizona Republic was murdered by a bomb explosion beneath his car. Led by Newsday journalist Robert W. Greene, the Arizona Project team consisted of 38 journalists from 28 newspapers and television stations. They went to Phoenix, Arizona to produce a 23-part series in 1977 exposing widespread corruption in the state.

== Programs ==
=== NICAR (National Institute for Computer-Assisted Reporting) ===
NICAR, a program of IRE, was founded in 1989, with the aim of assisting journalists with data journalism. NICAR is also a venue for journalists to discuss the use of government open records laws. It has dedicated English and Spanish Listservs, and the annual NICAR Conference is one of the largest data journalism conferences in the U.S.

=== Conferences and training ===
IRE hosts three annual conferences. The IRE and NICAR conferences are regarded as the biggest.

The IRE Conference is more broadly for investigative and data journalists, while the NICAR Conference is specific to data techniques. Both include in-person and virtual sessions on investigative and data methods, but the NICAR Conference includes more technical data skills, such as the use of programming languages, Census Bureau data and FOIA.

AccessFest, IRE's all-virtual conference, focuses on diversity, belonging, equity and inclusion. It aims at providing accessible training in investigative and data reporting to underserved communities.

IRE also holds regular paid bootcamps and workshops, and it provides training services to newsrooms and schools.

=== Resource Center ===
IRE members can access the Resource Center, a research library with stories, tipsheets, books, databases, audio recordings of conference presentations, newsletter issues and webinar recordings.

In 2023, the organization published the IRE Guides, a comprehensive list of free resources for journalists.

=== The IRE Journal ===
The Investigative Reporters & Editors Journal was first published in 1978. It is published quarterly in February, May, August and November and had a circulation of roughly 4,900 as of August 2023. The IRE Awards winners and finalists are published in the second edition of each year.

== See also ==
- Global Investigative Journalism Network, which IRE is a part of
- Brazilian Association of Investigative Journalism (ABRAJI)
- Center for Investigative Reporting (Bosnia and Herzegovina)
- Philippine Center for Investigative Journalism
