= Stephen Bolles =

20th-century American politician

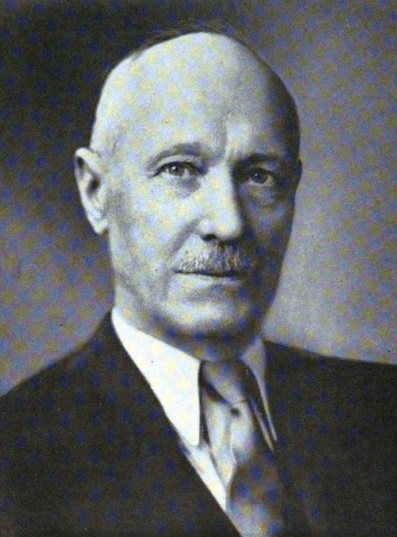

Member of the U.S. House of Representatives from Wisconsin's 1st district
- In office January 3, 1939 – July 8, 1941
- Preceded by: Thomas Ryum Amlie
- Succeeded by: Lawrence H. Smith

Personal details
- Born: June 25, 1866 Springboro, Pennsylvania, U.S.
- Died: July 8, 1941 (aged 75) Washington, D.C., U.S.
- Resting place: Oak Hill Cemetery, Janesville, Wisconsin
- Party: Republican
- Spouse: Aimee Carreras Wall

Stephen Bolles (June 25, 1866 – July 8, 1941) was an American newspaper editor and Republican politician from Janesville, Wisconsin. He was elected to two terms in the U.S. House of Representatives, representing Wisconsin's 1st congressional district from 1939 until his death in 1941. Before his election to Congress, he worked as editor of the Janesville Gazette for nearly 20 years; prior to that he worked as editor of the Toledo Blade, the Buffalo Enquirer, and several other newspapers in New York State.

== Early life ==
Born in Springboro, Crawford County, Pennsylvania, Bolles attended the public schools; was graduated from the State Normal School of Pennsylvania at Slippery Rock, Pennsylvania, in 1888 and from the law department of Milton College, Milton, Wisconsin.

== Career ==
In his early career, Bolles worked as reporter, correspondent, managing editor, and publisher of newspapers in Ohio, Pennsylvania, and New York from 1893 to 1901. Along with Mark Bennett, he was a superintendent of the press department of the Pan-American Exposition at Buffalo, New York, in 1901, and was reportedly among those with President William McKinley when the President was assassinated while visiting the Exposition.

Bolles was managing editor of the Buffalo Enquirer in 1902 and 1903; superintendent of graphic arts of the St. Louis Exposition from 1903 to 1905; and director of publicity of the Jamestown Exposition in 1907. He was engaged as a special writer and also in private business, including the "brokerage" business, in Atlanta, Georgia, from 1907 to 1919. In 1920, he moved to Janesville, Wisconsin, as editor of the Janesville Gazette and remained until 1939.

Wisconsin's 1st congressional district 1932–1963

Elected to the 76th and the 77th United States Congress as a Republican, Bolles served as United States representative for the first district of Wisconsin from January 3, 1939, until his death in 1941. As a congressman, Bolles was fiercely opposed to the Lend-Lease policy and tried to exclude the Soviet Union from the Lend-Lease program.

== Death ==
Bolles died in Washington, D.C., on July 8, 1941 (age 75 years, 13 days). He is interred at Oak Hill Cemetery, Janesville, Wisconsin. His grandchildren include Don Bolles, an investigative journalist murdered in 1976, author Richard Nelson Bolles, philosophy professor David L. Bolles, and author Edmund Blair Bolles.

== See also ==
- List of members of the United States Congress who died in office (1900–1949)

U.S. House of Representatives
| Preceded by Thomas Ryum Amlie | Member of the U.S. House of Representatives from Wisconsin's 1st congressional district 1939 – 1941 | Succeeded by Lawrence H. Smith |
