= Don Bolles =

American reporter murdered in car bombing (1928–1976)

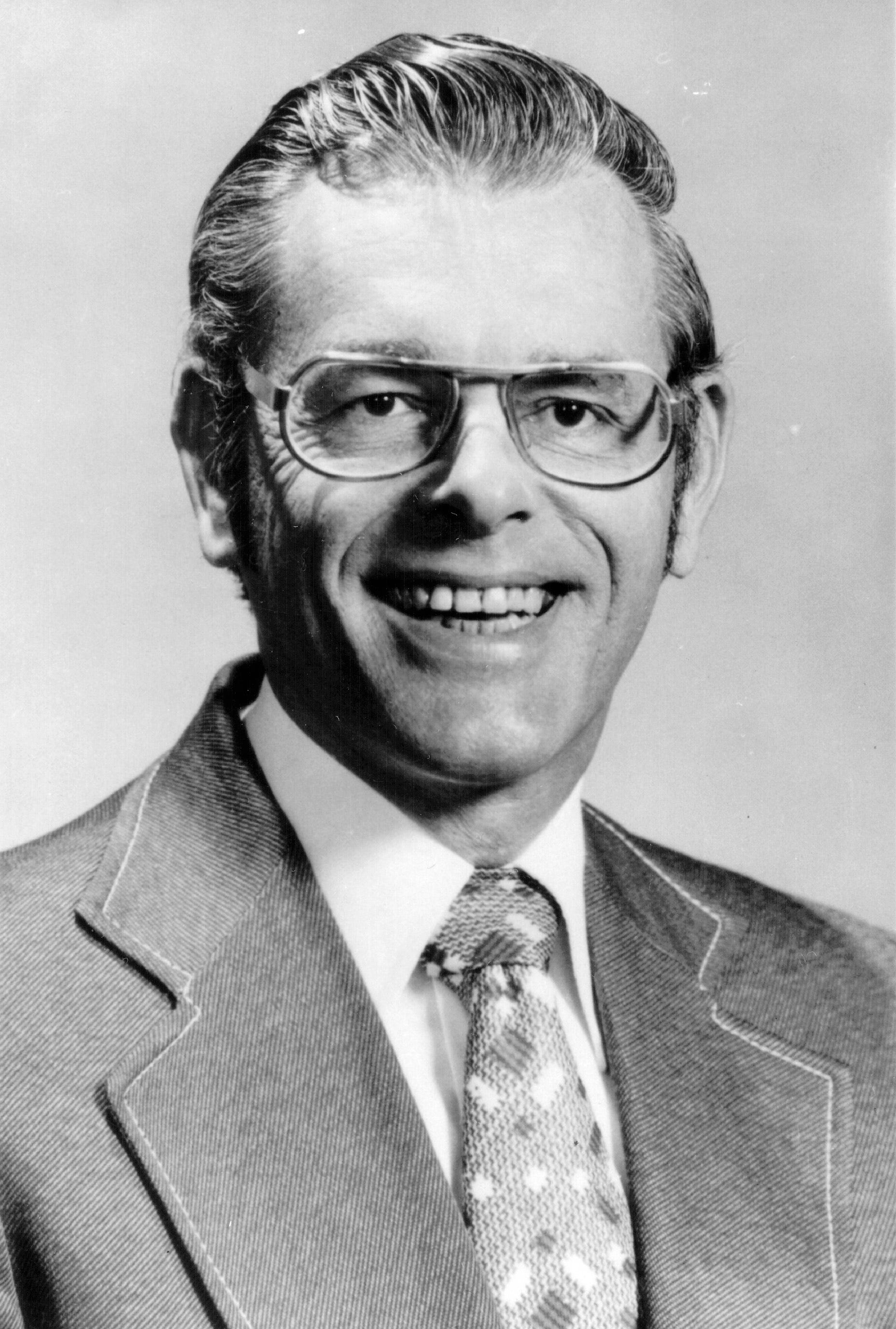
- Born: Donald Fifield Bolles; July 10, 1928; Milwaukee, Wisconsin, U.S.
- Died: June 13, 1976 (aged 47); Phoenix, Arizona, U.S.
- Cause of death: Car bomb
- Education: Beloit College (BA)
- Occupation: Journalist
- Notable credit: The Arizona Republic
- Spouse: Rosalie Crocker Bolles (m. 1968)
- Children: 7

Donald Fifield Bolles (July 10, 1928 – June 13, 1976) was an American investigative reporter for The Arizona Republic newspaper who was known for his coverage of organized crime in and around Phoenix, Arizona, especially by the Chicago Outfit. His murder in a car bombing was suspected to have been mob-related but was later found to be connected to his reporting on real estate fraud by local contractors.

== Biography ==
Don Bolles was born in Milwaukee, Wisconsin, on July 10, 1928. At a young age, he moved to New Jersey, where his father was chief of the state's Associated Press (AP) bureau; his paternal grandfather, Stephen Bolles, had also been in the newspaper business. Don was also the brother of clergyman and author Richard Nelson Bolles and the first cousin of humanist theoretician Edmund Blair Bolles.

Bolles graduated Teaneck High School in 1946, then obtained a degree in government from Beloit College, where he was editor of the campus newspaper The Round Table and received a President's Award for personal achievement. After serving in the Korean War, Bolles joined the AP as a sports editor and rewriter in New Jersey, New York and Kentucky.

In 1962, Bolles was hired by The Arizona Republic newspaper in Phoenix, Arizona, published at the time by Eugene C. Pulliam, where he quickly found a spot on the investigative beat and gained a reputation for dogged reporting of influence peddling, bribery and real estate fraud. Former colleagues say he seemed to grow disillusioned about his job in late 1975 and early 1976, and that he had requested to be taken off the investigative beat, moving to coverage of Phoenix City Hall and then the state legislature.

Bolles was married twice and had a total of seven children.

== Death ==
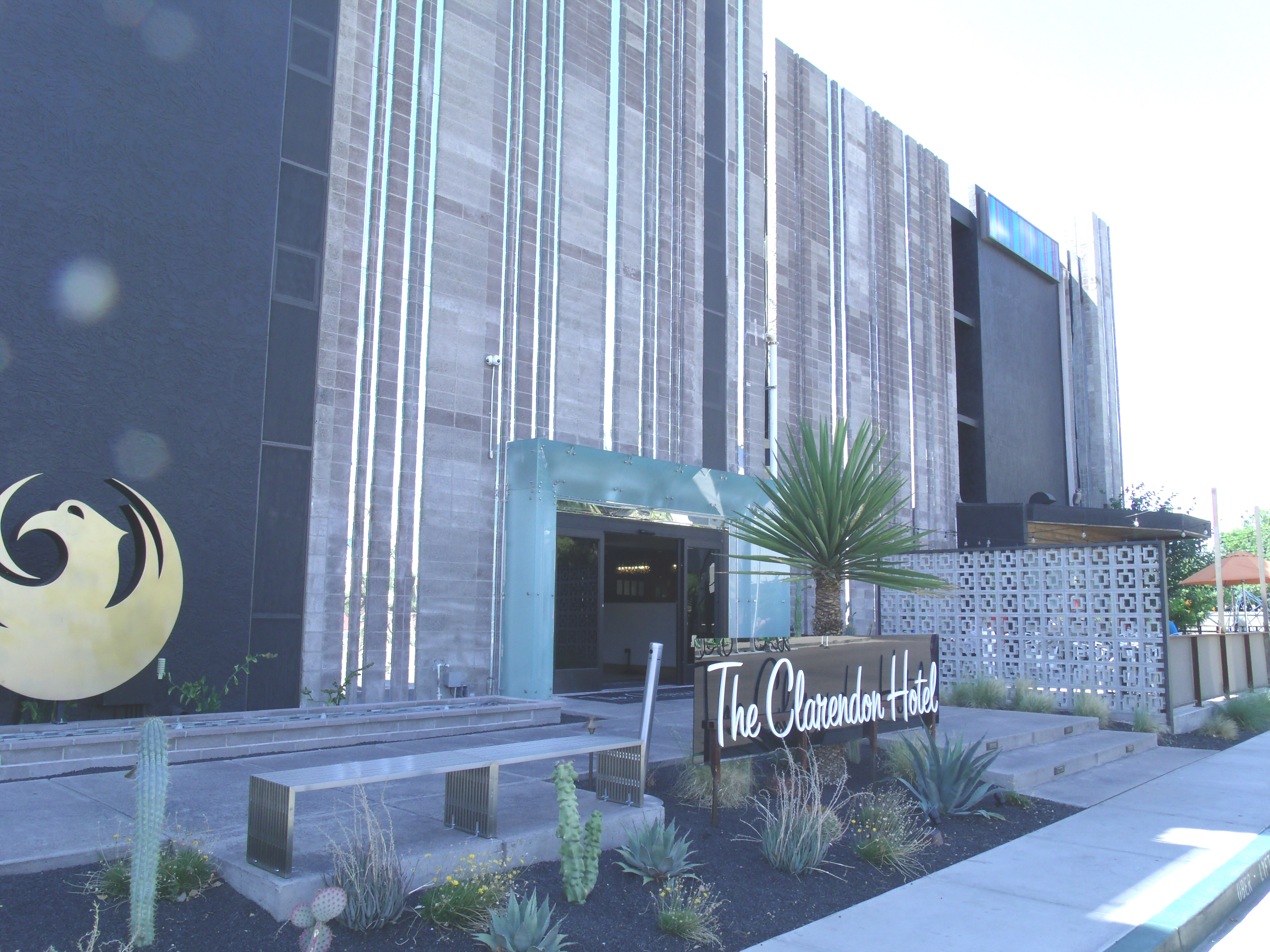
The Hotel Clarendon (now Clarendon Hotel) located at 401 W. Clarendon Dr.

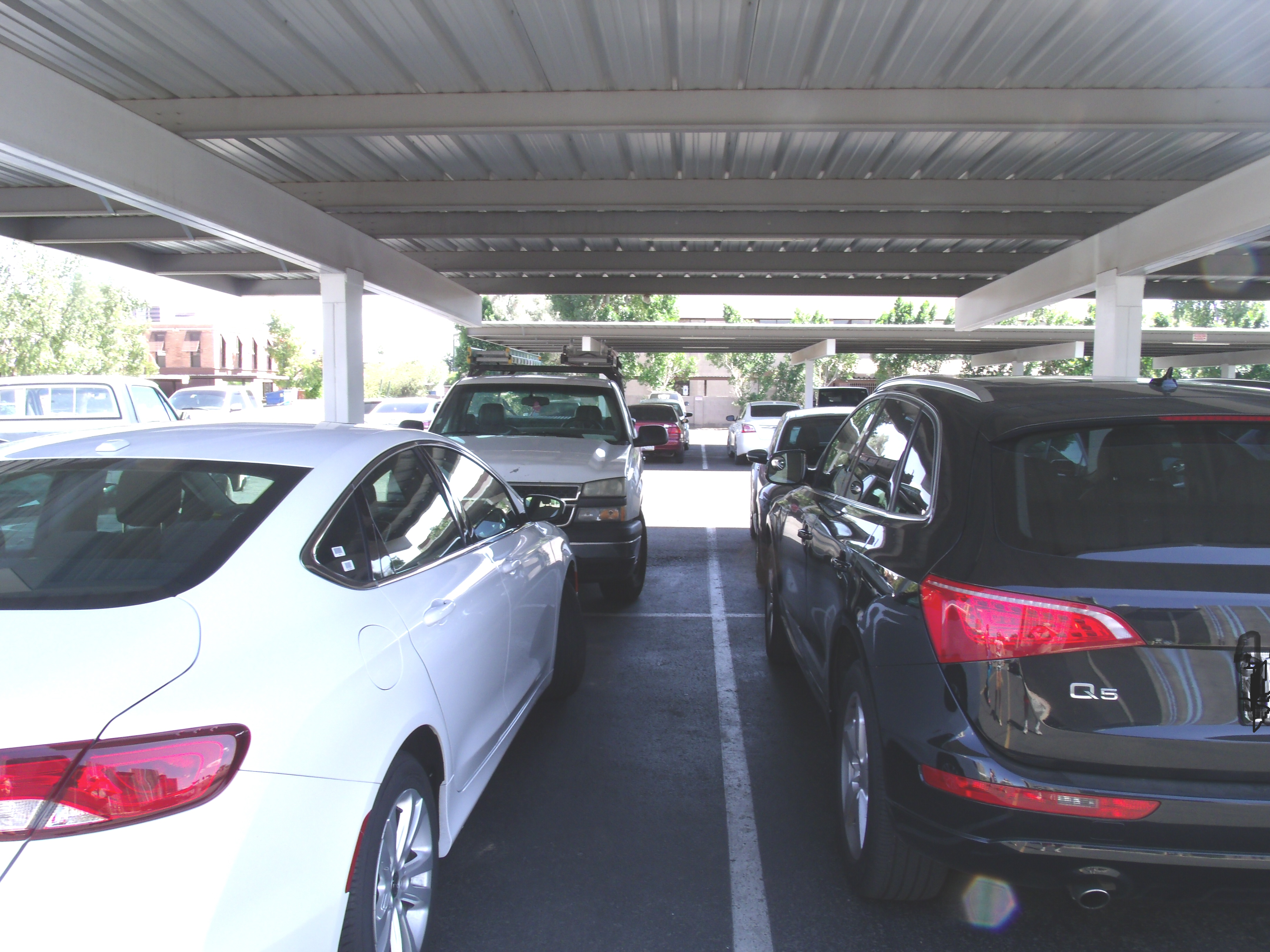
Parking space in the south parking area on 4th Avenue of the Hotel Clarendon where Bolles was murdered. The parking space is now a covered parking lot.

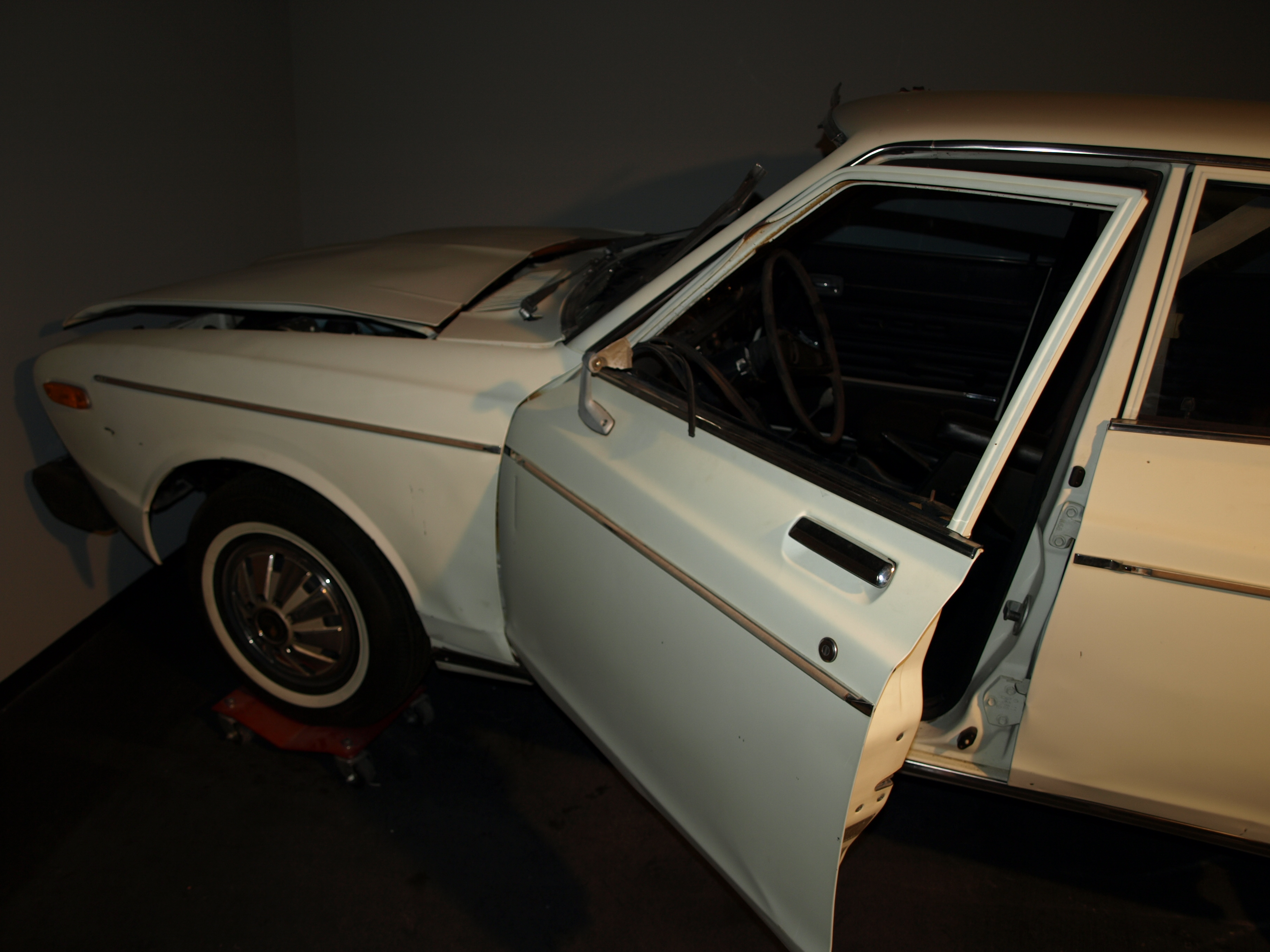
The 1976 Datsun 710 in which Bolles was fatally injured

On June 2, 1976, Bolles left a short note in his office typewriter explaining he would meet with an informant, John Adamson, then go to a luncheon meeting at the Hotel Clarendon (now the Clarendon Hotel) and would return by 1:30 p.m. Adamson had promised to divulge information on a land deal involving top state politicians and possibly the Mafia. Bolles spent several minutes waiting in the lobby of the hotel before being summoned by a call to the front desk, where the conversation with Adamson lasted no more than two minutes. Bolles then exited the hotel, having parked his car, a 1976 Datsun 710, in an adjacent lot on Fourth Avenue.

Just as Bolles was driving out of his parking space, a remote-controlled bomb consisting of six sticks of dynamite, taped to the underside of the car beneath the driver's seat, was detonated. The explosion shattered Bolles' lower body, opened the driver's door and left him lying half outside the vehicle, badly injured. Bolles was treated at St. Joseph's Hospital over the next ten days, during which one of his arms and both of his legs were amputated. He died from his injuries on June 13, at age 47.

Bolles' remains were interred in a crypt located in the Serenity Mausoleum of the Greenwood/Memory Lawn Mortuary & Cemetery in Phoenix.

=== Aftermath ===
Despite Bolles making statements implicating the Mafia following the bombing, The San Francisco Examiner reported on October 20 that Maricopa County District Attorney Donald Harris "said a conspiracy by 'the country club set' was more likely than Mafia involvement ... The mob doesn't kill cops and reporters. This is not a Mafia case." Bolles identified Adamson by photograph while hospitalized, and Adamson's former lawyer Mickey Clifton informed the police of his involvement in the bombing. According to trial testimony, Adamson purchased the electronics for two bombs while visiting San Diego, California, some of which was later found in his apartment. Adamson also allegedly visited The Arizona Republic employees' parking area on the day of the bombing and asked a guard which car belonged to Bolles.

Adamson pleaded guilty in 1977 to second-degree murder for building and planting the bomb that killed Bolles. Adamson accused Phoenix contractor Max Dunlap, an associate of rancher and liquor wholesaler Kemper Marley, of ordering the hit and Chandler plumber James Robison of triggering the bomb. Phoenix police said they could find no evidence linking Marley with the crime. Adamson testified against Dunlap and Robison, who were convicted of first-degree murder later in 1977 but whose convictions were overturned the following year.

When Adamson refused to testify again, he was convicted of first-degree murder in 1980 and sentenced to death, which was overturned by the Arizona Supreme Court. Robison was re-tried and acquitted in 1993, but pleaded guilty to a charge of soliciting an act of criminal violence against Adamson. Robison died in 2013. In 1990, Dunlap was re-charged when Adamson agreed to testify again, and was found guilty of first-degree murder. Dunlap died in an Arizona prison on July 21, 2009.

Adamson was given a reduced sentence because of his cooperation and was released from prison in 1996. He remained in the federal witness protection program, in which he had been placed in 1990 while he was still in prison, and died in an undisclosed location on May 22, 2002, at the age of 58.

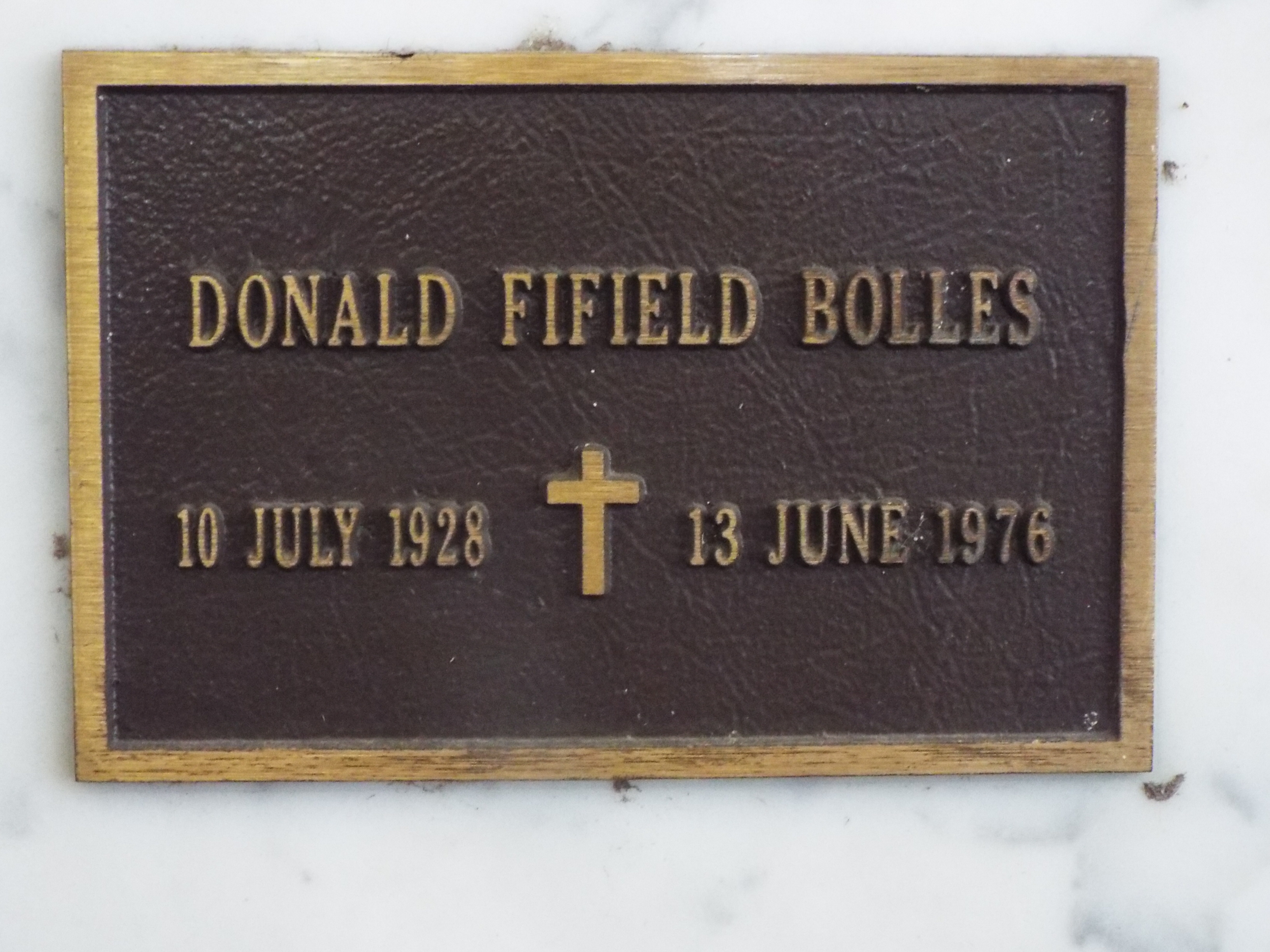
Bolles' crypt

Among the last words that Bolles uttered was "Emprise." Emprise (later called Sportservice and now called Delaware North) was a privately owned company that operated various dog- and horseracing tracks, and is a major food vendor for sports arenas. In 1972, the House Select Committee on Crime held hearings concerning Emprise's connections with organized crime figures. Around this time, Emprise and six individuals were convicted of concealing ownership of the Frontier Hotel in Las Vegas. As a result of the conviction, Emprise's dog racing operations in Arizona were placed under the legal authority of a trustee appointed by the Arizona State Racing Commission. Bolles was investigating Emprise at the time of his death. However, no connection between Emprise and his death was discovered.

== Documentary ==
The 2022 documentary Who Killed Don Bolles? details the involvement of veteran journalist Don Devereux in the investigative reporting in the aftermath of Bolles' death. Bradley Funk, an heir to the Emprise fortune and whose ex-wife had dealings with Bolles, was said by Devereux to have ordered the hit. Neal Roberts, an allegedly corrupt Phoenix attorney who was a close friend of Funk, was said to have contacted Adamson for help in the murder, who subsequently recruited known hitman Carl Verive. Neither Funk nor Roberts was ever indicted in the murder of Bolles, and Roberts was controversially granted immunity as an accessory after the fact.

Devereux also claims that he discovered evidence of state corruption in the killing of Bolles, with attorney general Bruce Babbitt having sought to take over the legal investigation due to his gambling debts and subsequent involvement with the Mafia. As a result, exculpatory evidence that would have cleared Dunlap and Robison was allegedly withheld, so as to assure their conviction and avoid undesirable attention on Emprise, the Mafia, and Babbitt's own indiscretions. Babbitt also negotiated the favorable plea deal for Adamson, who also was said to have avoided fingering the Mafia, resulting in flimsy testimony that nevertheless went largely unquestioned by Babbitt's office. After campaigning on forcing Emprise out of Arizona, Babbitt later reneged and played a major role in their ability to continue operations in the state.

Devereux also alleged that Bolles' travails at the Republic involved conflicts with the paper's upper management, who are known to have confiscated Bolles' reporting files immediately after his murder. His notes related to the Mafia and its connections to state officials and corruption were allegedly destroyed. Bolles' editor at the paper, Tom Sanford, said to be his only ally therein, followed up on Bolles' murder despite being forbidden by his superiors to work (or even speak) with the Investigative Reporters and Editors team investigating the mob and Emprise; the resulting IRE series was not published in the Republic. Sanford spoke with Roberts as part of his own investigation of the murder and thereafter made plans to speak with Bolles' second wife to reveal his findings. Just hours after that phone call, Sanford was found dead in a field of a shotgun wound and his demise was ruled a suicide. The shotgun had no fingerprints and, despite a bottle of whiskey being found in his car, his blood showed no signs of alcohol consumption.

== Tributes ==
The Newseum, which was a $400 million interactive museum of news and journalism located in Washington, D.C., featured Bolles' 1976 Datsun 710, as the centerpiece of a gallery devoted to both Bolles and fellow slain journalist Chauncey Bailey. The car had previously sat for 28 years in the Arizona Department of Public Safety's impound lot. The Newseum closed in 2019.

== Arizona Project ==
In response to Bolles' death, the board of Investigative Reporters and Editors (IRE) decided to continue Bolles' work in exposing corruption and organized crime in Arizona. Led by Newsday journalist Robert W. Greene, the Arizona Project team consisted of 38 journalists from 28 newspapers and television stations. They produced a 23-part series in 1977 exposing widespread corruption in the state, and a book, The Arizona Project.

On the 40th anniversary of the Arizona Project, the Don Bolles Award was established. The first recipient was Miroslava Breach Velducea.

== Awards ==
- Conscience-in-Media Award, from the American Society of Journalists and Authors
- Arizona Press Club Newsman of the Year in 1974
- John Peter Zenger Award for Press Freedom 1976 (posthumous)

== See also ==
- List of journalists killed in the United States
- Censorship in the United States
