= Richard Nelson Bolles =

Episcopal clergyman and author (1927–2017)

- Born: March 19, 1927; Milwaukee, Wisconsin, U.S.
- Died: March 31, 2017 (aged 90); San Ramon, California, U.S.
- Education: Harvard University
- Occupations: Author, clergyman

Richard Nelson Bolles (March 19, 1927 – March 31, 2017) was an Episcopal clergyman and the author of the best-selling job-hunting book, What Color is Your Parachute?

== Early life ==
Bolles was born in Milwaukee, Wisconsin. He was the brother of investigative journalist Don Bolles and of Ann Bolles Johnson. His paternal grandfather, Stephen Bolles, was a U.S. member of Congress from Wisconsin (died 1941), and his father was for many years an editor with the Associated Press (died 1972). Richard grew up in Teaneck, New Jersey, and graduated from Teaneck High School in 1945, where his yearbook described him stating "Dick's future will be scientific / But in which field he's not specific." After a brief stint in the United States Navy, he attended Massachusetts Institute of Technology, studying chemical engineering, and Harvard University, where he majored in physics and graduated with a B.A., cum laude. He attended General Theological Seminary (Episcopal) in New York City, from which he graduated with a master's degree in New Testament studies.

== Career ==
After his ordination in 1953, Bolles served as a Fellow and Tutor at the Seminary, and then served in churches in New Jersey as a rector. Following this, he served as Canon Pastor of Grace Cathedral in San Francisco. He also served on the National Staff of United Ministries in Higher Education for a number of years.

Bolles made public speaking appearances and used to lead workshops around the United States. He released an updated edition of his 1970 Parachute book every year, as well as working on new titles. The latest title was "The Job-Hunter's Survival Guide", a short 100-page book. He had various co-authors for some of his other books, including Howard Figler, Carol Christen, Dale Brown, and one of his sons, Mark Bolles. Mark is the principal author of their book Job Hunting on the Internet ISBN 1-58008-652-7. He was also a member of high-IQ society Mensa.

== Personal life ==
Bolles died in Danville, California, at the age of 90. He was survived by his fourth wife, the former Marciana Garcia Mendoza Navarrete, and three children.

== Honors ==
Bolles was the 2006 recipient of the National Samaritan award, joining such prestigious company as Karl Menninger, Peter Drucker, Norman Vincent Peale, Betty Ford, and Sir John Templeton. The Library of Congress in 1996 named his book as one of 25 that have shaped readers' lives. His book first appeared on The New York Times best-seller list in 1979, where it remained for more than a decade.
