= Edmund Blair Bolles =

American humanist and science writer

- Born: 1942 (age 83–84)
- Education: Washington University in St. Louis (BA); University of Pennsylvania (MA)
- Occupations: Humanist; science writer; author
- Writing career
- Language: English
- Notable works: The Ice Finders; Einstein Defiant; Galileo's Commandment (editor)

Edmund Blair Bolles (born 1942) is an American humanist and science writer. His work often explores the intersection of science and culture, including books on geology, physics, memory, language and perception.

== Early life and education ==
Bolles grew up in Washington, D.C., Paris, and Toledo, Ohio. He earned a bachelor's degree from Washington University in St. Louis and a master's degree in English from the University of Pennsylvania. He served two years in Tanzania as a Peace Corps volunteer teaching science, mathematics and agriculture, and has lived in Washington State, Los Angeles and New York. He is also listed by the Peace Corps among its notable volunteers in Arts & Literature.

== Career ==
Bolles has worked for decades as a freelance writer with a special interest in the meeting point between science and human imagination. His books have addressed subjects ranging from the discovery of the Ice Age to the intellectual debates surrounding quantum theory, and from memory and perception to language development and adoption.

=== Reception ===
Einstein Defiant received positive trade reviews; Publishers Weekly called it "highly recommended for science buffs as well as readers of biography and cultural history" (Feb. 23, 2004), and Library Journal described it as "colorful, readable, and well explains Einstein’s reservations about quantum mechanics" (Mar. 1, 2004).

== Selected works ==
- Einstein Defiant: Genius versus Genius in the Quantum Revolution
- The Ice Finders: How a Poet, a Professor, and a Politician Discovered the Ice Age
- Galileo’s Commandment: An Anthology of Great Science Writing (editor)
- A Second Way of Knowing
- Remembering and Forgetting: Inquiries into the Nature of Memory
- So Much to Say: How to Help Your Child Learn to Talk
- Babel’s Dawn: A Natural History of the Origins of Speech (2011)
- Who Owns America?
- The Penguin Adoption Handbook
- Adoption Handbook (2nd ed.)
- The Beauty of America
- Fodor’s Animal Parks of Africa

Major works (themes)

- So Much to Say (1980): on early language; argues children speak because they have "something to say"—private thoughts/emotions to report.
- Remembering and Forgetting (1986): opens with "Remembering is an act of imagination"; distinguishes computer storage from human remembering as sensory re-creation.
- A Second Way of Knowing (1991): on perception as grasping meaning from the senses; contrasts animal/human, sensory-based knowing with symbolic computation.

== Personal life ==
Bolles lives in New York City. He is the son of journalist and executive E. Blair Bolles and Mona Dugas. His father was, among other jobs, a foreign correspondent for The Washington Star and The Blade of Toledo, Ohio. His mother was a society reporter for The Washington Star. His siblings include film sound editor/film librarian Harry Peck Bolles, Charles DeVallon Dugas Bolles, and a sister, Zoe. Through his father, he is a grandson of former Wisconsin congressman Stephen Bolles and Zoe (née Blair) Bolles.
