= New Jersey State Police =

State police of New Jersey, United States

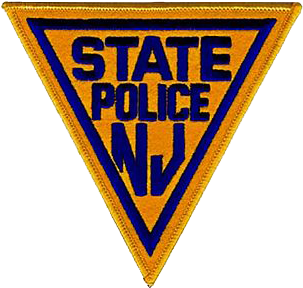
- New Jersey State Police patch

- Logo of the New Jersey State Police

- Seal of the New Jersey State Police
- Abbreviation: NJSP
- Motto: Honor, Duty, Fidelity

Agency overview
- Formed: March 29, 1921; 105 years ago
- Employees: 3,811 (as of 2022)

Jurisdictional structure
- Operations jurisdiction: New Jersey, USA
- NJSP Troops
- Area: 8,729 square miles (22,610 km^{2})
- Population: 9.24 million (2022 est.)
- Legal jurisdiction: New Jersey, United States
- General nature: Local civilian police

Operational structure
- Headquarters: Ewing Township, New Jersey, United States
- Troopers: 2,800 (as of 2022)
- Civilian employees: 1,226
- Agency executive: Lt. Colonel (Ret.) Jeanne Hengemuhle, Acting Superintendent

Facilities
- Troops: 4: Troop A: Southern New Jersey (including the Atlantic City Expressway); Troop B: Northern New Jersey; Troop C: Central New Jersey; Troop D: New Jersey Turnpike, Garden State Parkway

Website
- www.njsp.org

The New Jersey State Police (NJSP) is the state police force of the U.S. state of New Jersey. It is a general-powers police agency with statewide jurisdiction, a division under Attorney General's Office.

== History ==
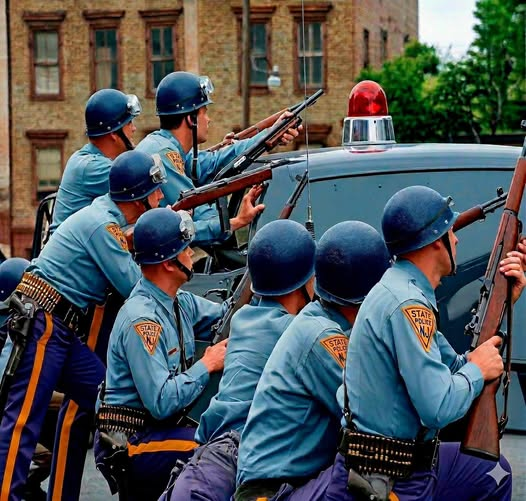
NJSP troopers during the Newark riots in 1967

The legislation for the creation of the NJSP was first introduced in 1914, but it would not be until March 29, 1921, with the passing of the State Police Bill, that a statewide police force was created. Senator Clarence E. Case was the driving force behind the 1921 legislation.

The person with the most impact on the organization was its first Superintendent Norman Schwarzkopf Sr. He was a graduate of West Point and this training and his time in the military heavily influenced how he organized and trained his first group of troopers. "Honor, Duty, Fidelity", adapted from the West Point motto "Duty, Honor, Country", is the motto of the NJSP. The triangular state police logo and hat badge represents this motto. The badge was created by New York jeweler Julius George Schwarzkopf, the father of founder Herbert Norman Schwarzkopf. The NJSP logo includes the year 1921, date of founding, in place of a badge number.

The first State Police class reported for training on September 1, 1921, and consisted of 116 men out of an applicant group of 600. Training took place in Sea Girt, New Jersey on the same grounds as the current State Police Academy. Out of the 116 men who started training only 81 officers and troopers completed the three-month training program. According to the New Jersey State Police website:

"On December 1, 1921, the new troopers were administered the oath of office and on December 5, 1921, in a blinding snowstorm, started out on horseback and motorcycle to their posts throughout the state."

In February 2026, NJ governor Mikie Sherille nominated Jeanne Hengemuhle to serve as New Jersey State Police Superintendent.. In October 2026, NJ Senate confirms retired Lt. Colonel Jeanne Hengemuhle of the 117th SP class as Superintendent, the first female and openly gay in the agency's 105 history.

=== Racial profiling ===
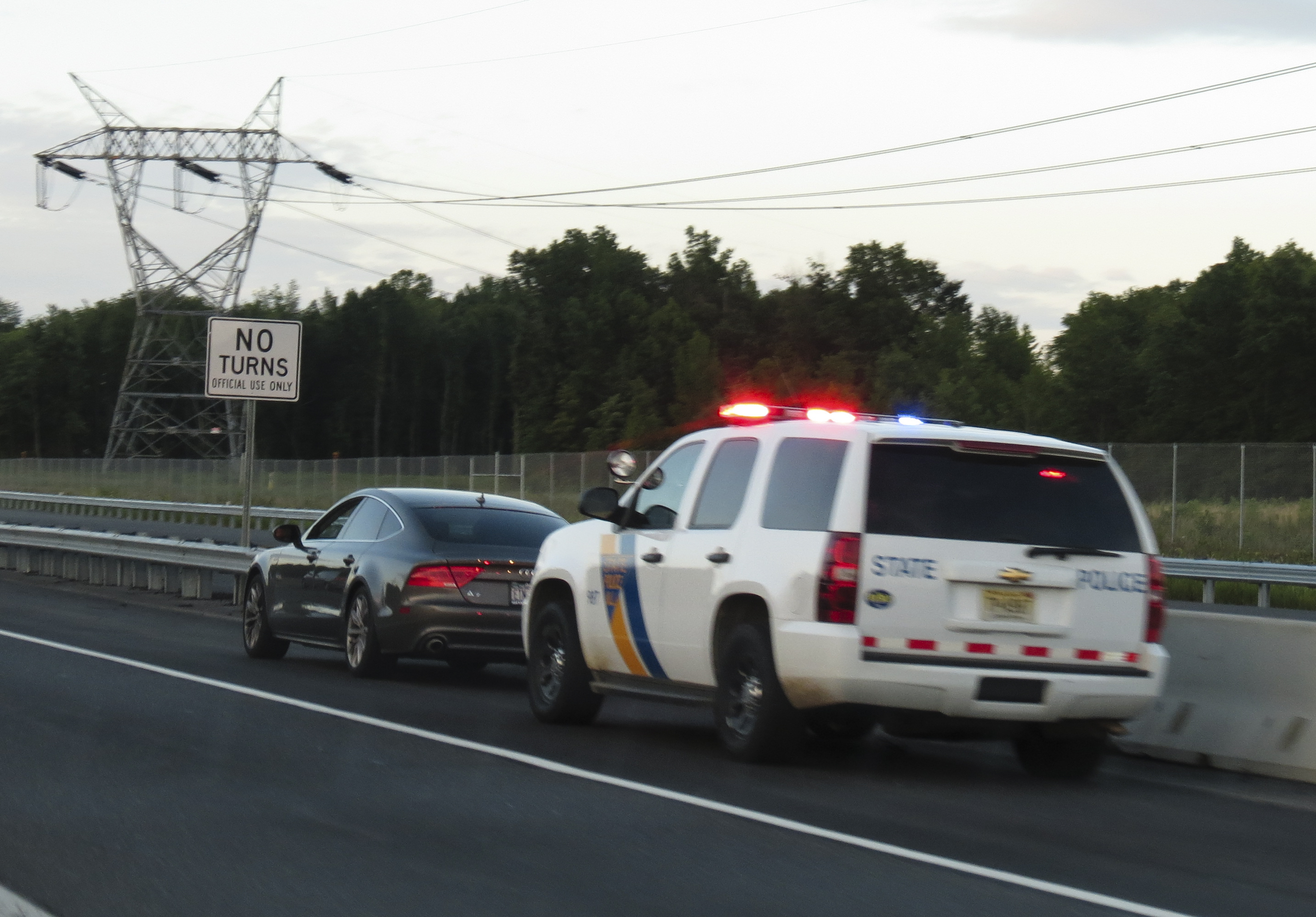
A New Jersey State Police trooper pulls over a vehicle on the New Jersey Turnpike

In the late 1990s, both the Maryland and New Jersey State Police agencies were subject to allegations of racial profiling which claimed that black motorists were being pulled over disproportionately on the New Jersey Turnpike and on Interstate 95. A nationwide controversy erupted, which ultimately resulted in a federal monitor watching over the New Jersey State Police. In a consent decree, the New Jersey State Police agreed to adopt a new policy that no individual may be detained based on race, unless said individual matches the description of a specific suspect. The consent decree was dissolved on September 21, 2009.

=== New Jersey Turnpike shooting ===
On April 23, 1998, Troopers James Kenna and John Hogan opened fire on a van they stopped for speeding on the New Jersey Turnpike. The four passengers in the van were unarmed. The troopers said they fired, wounding three of the four minority men inside, when the van lurched back toward them. This also started the investigation of possible racial profiling within law enforcement in New Jersey.

=== Lords of Discipline ===
On December 1, 2003, Trooper Justin Hopson filed a lawsuit in U.S. District Court in Camden. Hopson alleged in his complaint that he was hazed and harassed by a group of fellow state troopers known as the "Lords of Discipline." The hazing occurred when Hopson, with only eleven days on the force at the time, refused to falsify the facts underlying an illegal arrest of a citizen. The complaint alleges that after Hopson refused to support the arrest, he was physically assaulted, received threatening notes, and his car was vandalized while on duty. Over the years, several troopers have come forward about the Lords of Discipline. The secret group allegedly drove nails into colleagues' tires, damaged lockers, and wore Lords of Discipline inscribed T-shirts. The NJ Attorney General's Office conducted a two-year investigation into the group where seven troopers were suspended or reprimanded but the probe found "no organized group of troopers known as the Lords of Discipline." On October 1, 2007, the State of New Jersey agreed to a $400,000 settlement with Justin Hopson. A spokesman for the attorney general called the Hopson settlement "fair and reasonable."

=== Arrest of Officer Gary S. Wade ===
On August 17, 2004, New Jersey State Police Troopers Michael Colaner and David Ryan pulled over Detective Gary S. Wade of the Tinton Falls Police Department for allegedly speeding.

Detective Wade, who worked for the Police Department in Tinton Falls for eight years, was supposedly on his way to work and driving with his seatbelt on in an unmarked police car with a spotlight on the driver's side, wearing a shirt with an embroidered badge on it and also wearing a badge on his belt. After being pulled over Wade called his supervisor according to his department's protocol and asked the state troopers to wait until his supervisor arrived.

However, the dash camera from trooper Colaner's patrol vehicle indicated that within 30 seconds Colaner had pulled a gun on Wade who was still in his car. According to a transcript of the video Wade had asked twice why he was being pulled over and received no answer from the troopers. Colaner then informed Wade that he was placing Wade under arrest for disorderly conduct and after a 90-second exchange the troopers pulled Wade out of his car. The video then shows Colaner hitting Wade in the back of the head with a fist wrapped around a can of pepper spray just before Wade was forced to the ground. Wade was then doused with pepper spray and handcuffed.

Wade was subsequently charged and convicted in 2006 in municipal court, of the disorderly persons (misdemeanor) offense: Obstruction of Administration of Law, and the traffic infraction of careless driving. He was convicted again in Superior Court and was ordered to forfeit his position with the Borough of Tinton Falls Police Department. His appeal of the conviction and forfeiture was denied in 2008. However, in 2010, a federal jury in a civil lawsuit found that Trooper Colaner used excessive force in the handling of Wade and awarded Wade $5 million in compensatory and punitive damages.

=== Trooper Robert Higbee ===
On September 27, 2006, Trooper Robert Higbee was attempting to stop a speeding car, driven by Joshua Wigglesworth, when he failed to yield at a stop sign at the intersection of Stagecoach and Tuckahoe Roads in Marmora, an unincorporated part of Upper Township, Cape May County. He then collided with a minivan occupied by two sisters, 17-year-old Jacqueline and 19-year-old Christina Becker, which then collided with another vehicle occupied by Robert Taylor and his son Michael. Jacqueline and Christina Becker were pronounced dead at the scene. Higbee was suspended without pay after being indicted and tried on two counts of vehicular homicide in the deaths of Jacqueline and Christina Becker. Higbee was subsequently acquitted on all counts. The mother of Jacqueline and Christina Becker has settled a civil lawsuit for $2 million, while Taylor has filed a lawsuit against Higbee and the New Jersey State Police. These events, including the criminal trial, have been depicted in Closing the Gap, an account by Higbee's defense attorney D. William Subin.

=== Chris Christie helicopter to baseball game ===
On May 31, 2011, New Jersey State Police helicoptered Governor Chris Christie and his wife, Mary Pat, to their son's high school baseball game in Montvale, NJ, Morris County. At the baseball game, another NJSP vehicle, a black car with tinted windows, drove Christie and his wife to and from the helicopter to the baseball field—approximately 200 yards. NJSP then helicoptered Christie to Princeton to meet with Republican business leaders from Iowa who were trying to draft him to run for president. The AgustaWestland helicopter cost tax-payers $12.5 million and was operated by NJSP personnel. Christie and Colonel Joseph Rick Fuentes defended the use of NJSP department resources, though New Jersey residents complained about the misuse of government and police resources for personal entertainment. Assemblyman Paul Moriart called on the governor to disclose the use of NJSP helicopters and reimburse taxpayers for the costs associated with personal and political trips. "Gov. Christie must learn that tax payers cannot afford his helicopter joyrides", said Moriart.

=== Arrest of Rebecca Musarra ===
On October 16, 2015, New Jersey State Troopers Matthew Stazzone and Demetric Gosa arrested Philadelphia-based attorney Rebecca Musarra. The arrest was captured on dashcam video from Stazzone's patrol vehicle. The video showed that when Stazzone asked Musarra the reason he has stopped her, Musarra asserted that she did not have to answer questions. Trooper Stazzone then arrested her for "obstruction" for failing to answer the question. Stazzone read Musarra her Miranda rights, including a statement about her right to remain silent and not answer questions. According to a lawsuit filed by Musarra in federal court, Stazzone and Gosa then took her to the State Police barracks in Washington, NJ. Once there, a supervisor viewed the tape of the arrest and informed Musarra that her arrest had been a mistake. In March 2017, the New Jersey State Police sent Musarra a letter stating that her allegations of false arrest and illegal search had been substantiated. Later that year, in August 2017, Musarra settled her federal lawsuit related to the incident for $30,000. Stazzone and Gosa remained on-duty after the incident and were reportedly given additional training.

=== Trooper Trump ===
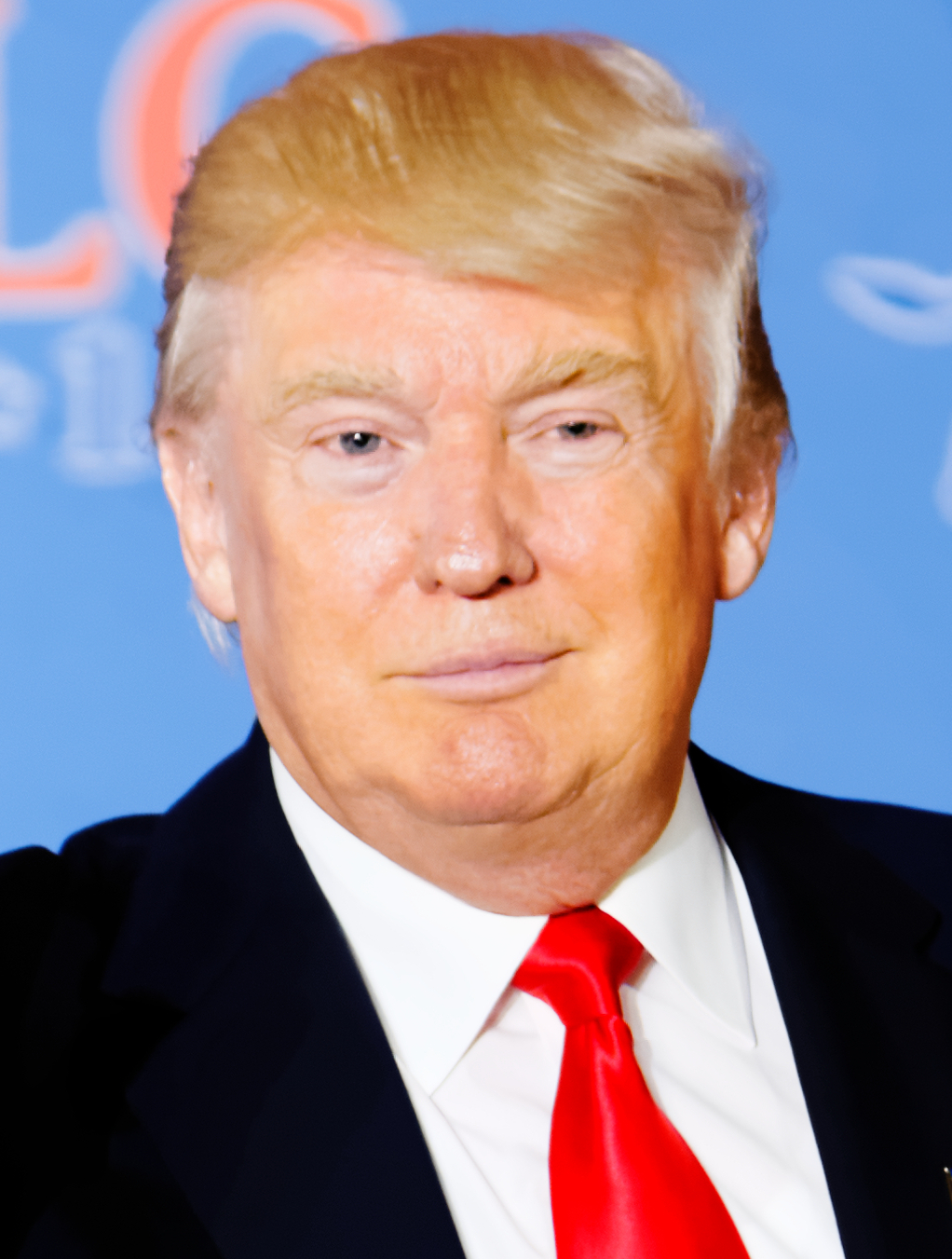
In 2017, President Donald Trump was awarded as an honorary state trooper with badge #45 by the state police for his support of law enforcement.

In 2017, the State Police made President Donald Trump an honorary state trooper, giving him the badge number 45 (that had been assigned to Trooper Leo A. Griffin of the First Class in 1921, who did not graduate), in a private ceremony at the White House. Officials presenting the award included Patrick Callahan, Rick Fuentes and Jeffrey Mottley.

=== Racism investigations ===
In July 2023, the NAACP New Jersey State Conference called upon the Department of Justice and state Attorney General Matt Platkin to investigate allegations of systemic racism and discrimination within the state police. In September 2024, two separate reports were released in response to the allegations, with one focusing on the state police's Office of Professional Standards and the other on the state police's practices for recruitment, hiring, and promotion. The release of the reports led the NAACP to call for state police leadership to be replaced.

A 2023 report found evidence of racial disparities in traffic enforcement by NJSP. After the release of the report, the NJSP was suspected to engage in a work slowdown, as it issued substantially fewer traffic tickets.

=== Alleged antisemitic remarks ===
On October 24, 2024, The New York Post reported that the state police's second-in-command, Lieutenant Colonel Sean Kilcomons, allegedly made an antisemitic remark about state Attorney General Matt Platkin and his son. Shortly thereafter, an investigation was opened into the allegations, which Attorney General Platkin recused himself from.

=== Trooper Santos: Double slaying and suicide ===
Lt. Santos of South River NJ was a State Trooper for over 20 years. He formerly served in executive protection unit for Governor Chris Christie and Joe Murphy.

On Aug. 1st 2025, Franklin Township police received three 911 calls reporting gunshots and screaming in the area of Upper Kingtown Road. Next day, victim's father discovered two bodies at his daughter's residence. "Santos was found on Aug. 2 inside a white 2008 Mercedes SUV in Johnson Park, Piscataway, dead by a self-inflicted gunshot wound on his birthday."

=== Response to Delaney Hall protests ===
On May 22, 2026, in Newark, New Jersey, immigrants detained in Delaney Hall, a private prison run by GEO Group used for holding immigrants detained by Immigration and Customs Enforcement (ICE), held a month-long hunger and labor strike protesting conditions inside the facility. Detainees were allegedly given expired food with worms or mold, sleep on the floor in overcrowded rooms, have been denied medical care for serious conditions, and have reportedly been abused by guards. Protests and civil unrest outside the facility in support of the strikers quickly escalated, resulting in over 90 arrests. Conditions inside the facility worsened, with reports of batons, pepper spray, and tear gas being used against strikers and multiple ambulances arriving at the facility throughout the strike. The strikes ended due to actions taken by guards to intimidate, segregate, and discipline strikers, such as by putting strike leaders in solitary confinement, threatening to force-feed strikers, and transporting strikers to unknown facilities around the country.

==== May 29 ====
External May 29 footage
- A cellist activist plays music — Independent videographer
- Police announce dispersal orders — Status Coup
- Journalists ordered to leave car — WNBC
- ICE agents shoot pepper bullets — Status Coup
- Horseback police advance on protesters — Status Coup
- Police use flash bangs and tear gas against protesters — Status Coup

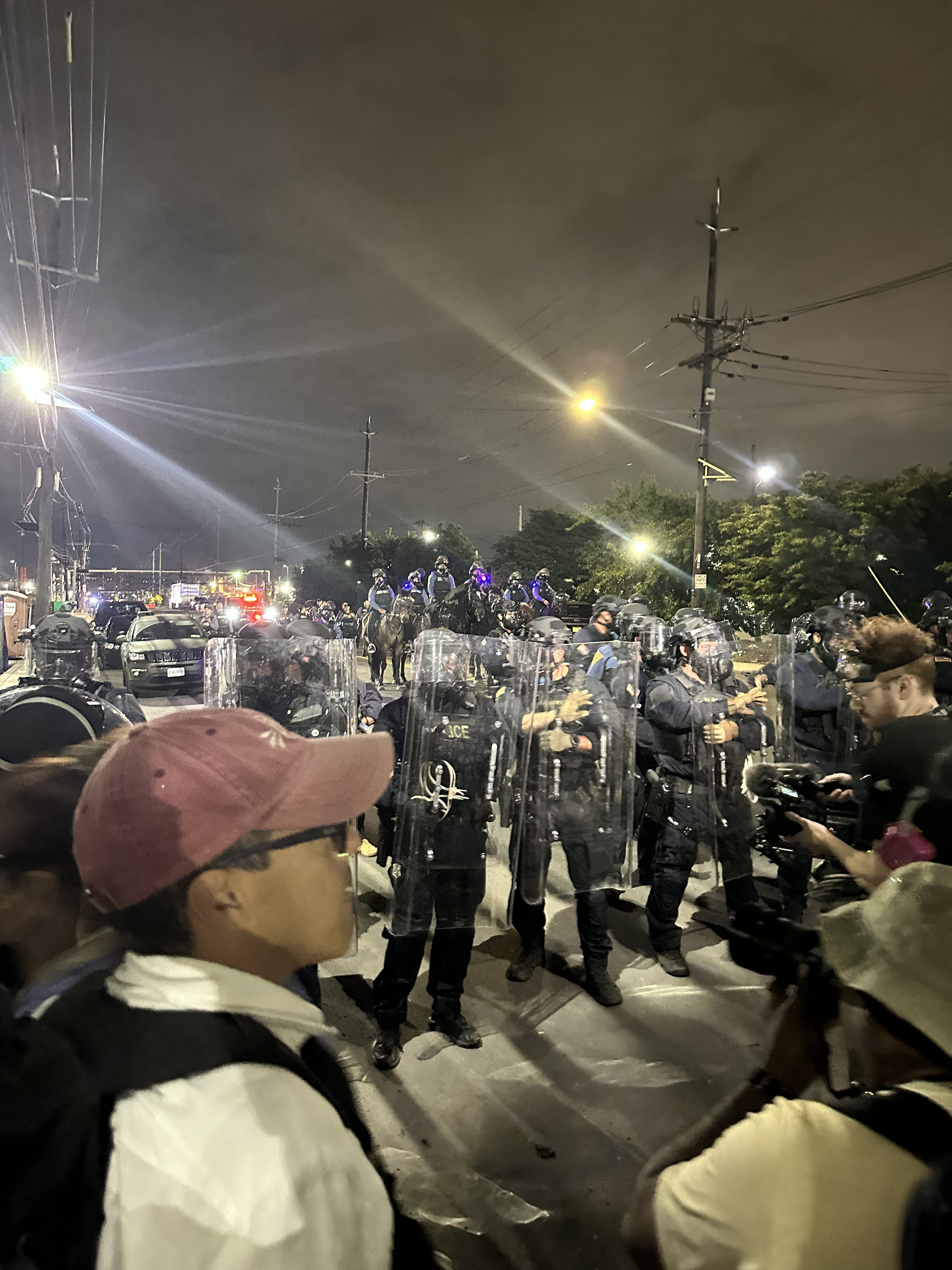
- NJSP issue dispersal orders for protesters
- NJSP in riot gear and on horseback in formation shortly before enforcing the curfew
- NJSP riot police advance on protesters with riot shields and stun grenades, while protesters use the traffic cone method to dispose tear gas
- NJSP horseback police advance on protesters, May 29, 2026

On Friday May 29, Governor Sherrill ordered New Jersey State Police (NJSP), in collaboration with the Newark Police Division (NPD) and ICE, to take over operations outside Delaney Hall for ICE and establish a "peaceful, protected protest zone" for protesters to go inside in an attempt to "cool things down." She claimed she did so out of fear that there would be a surge of ICE agents in New Jersey if she did not send police to respond. The protest zone created by police was a 600-yard (550 meter) enclosure outside the facility consisting of orange interlinked metal bicycle parking rack fences and concrete blocks.

Department of Homeland Security (DHS) secretary Markwayne Mullin lauded the announcement as a "win for law and order," saying "Thank you, governor." Some protesters staged a sit-in and refused to move into the protest zone, which many protesters characterized as a "cage" and a WNBC reporter characterized as a "pen." One protester said "When sunset happens, they’re going to push us into that cage and mace the fuck out of us."

A Rolling Stone reporter said when they arrived at 6:30pm, "Militant, masked anti-fascists stared down a line of ICE agents in full combat gear — body armor, helmets, guns — standing at the gates of the facility." Most protesters were unwilling to give their real names to reporters due to safety concerns. Police gave up on forcing protesters into the zone, and according to the Rolling Stone:

After 9pm, an NJSP sergeant arrived in a police SUV and read out an order to disperse from Delaney Hall over a loud speaker, with some members of the crowd yelling back. Officials said this was done in order to create a path for vehicles to exit the facility after state negotiations with federal officials concluded so police could assume control, and street medics in the crowd spread word of the shift change. Shortly after, a line of riot police appeared equipped with riot shields.

A coordinator for the Catholic advocacy group Pax Christi and a leader in Eyes on ICE said she thought the state police presence was "going to be a good thing" and that "up until the point when we saw the riot police with their riot shields, I thought we were gonna be okay based on all the representations I had gotten from legislators for a couple of days now."

NJSP riot police marched down the street on protesters who remained in the area, chanting "GET BACK. GET BACK. GET BACK." Riot police tossed a "volley of flash-bang grenades" that "ripped down the street," causing protesters to fall back. At the same time, officers fired tear gas at protesters using grenade launchers. Some protesters used the traffic cone method to dispose tear gas. As riot police marched, a WNBC news crew covering the clashes from inside a car was ordered by riot police to exit the car, forcing them to step into a cloud of tear gas. A reporter in the news crew said as she ran through the tear gas, she passed nonviolent protesters standing their ground and refusing to leave. At one point, the riot line "split abruptly" creating an opening, and police on horseback advanced through the opening towards protesters, forcing them back. The horses reached the "protest zone" fences, and metal clangs from the fences frightened the horses. The protesters quickly dismantled the "free-speech zone" and shoved its barriers under cars so people wouldn't be trapped or trampled as riot police advanced.

As riot police pushed protesters back, ICE agents watched and fired pepper balls from the facility according to The Nation, which ICE later denied. Troopers began making arrests, "slamming several protesters to the ground" and using pepper spray on the crowd. One officer "beat a demonstrator with a baton across the torso, knee, and calves as he tried to flee." One volunteer asked an old man for his name as he was "groaning" and "retching," with streaming eyes and his hands zip tied behind his back as he was being escorted behind the riot line and past the razor-wire fence into the detention center. Another woman arrested was "moaning in pain, one of her legs unable to support her weight." The next day, NJSP Lieutenant Colonel David Sierotowicz said "We were not striking anybody last night" and claimed they had used standard policing tactics. By the end of the night, six protesters (one from New Jersey, and five from New York and Pennsylvania) had been arrested and were later charged with disorderly conduct and obstruction of law enforcement. Four people arrested by ICE agents that night were charged with assaulting law enforcement officers, obstruction, and threats.

One man had been sitting down on a concrete barricade playing his cello as the riot police advanced, saying he considered it "to be a de-escalatory thing to do." The police then arrested him, and he was subsequently called by the Federal Bureau of Investigation (FBI), which asked him for details about protesters they described as "anybody planning to go to Delaney Hall with not the right intentions." The Intercept characterized this as the FBI trying to "flip" protesters into informants.

As troopers pushed protesters down the street past Delaney Hall, ICE agents watching from the facility advanced on protester supplies containing aid and food and began "trashing everything in sight." Shortly after, a convoy of vehicles containing ICE agents and DHS officers left the facility behind the riot line. After vehicles left the facility, riot police retreated and protesters began regrouping, with some chanting "Whose streets? Our streets!"

Protesters also confronted conservative influencer Cam Higby that night, and Higby pepper sprayed protesters during a confrontation.

After the skirmishes, one ICE vehicle was visible with a concrete block atop its smashed windshield, and one protester was charged with criminal mischief for smashing car windows by the NPD. The following morning, pepper spray was still able to be smelled in the air.

Sherrill censured out of state protesters, saying "To the people coming from out of state to create chaos and dangerous situations: you should not be here." She also said of the protesters "I do not know why these individuals attacked or what they wanted to accomplish." The DHS accused protesters of being part of a "coordinated campaign of violence against our ICE law enforcement." New Jersey Attorney General Jennifer Davenport accused protesters of throwing tear gas canisters at police prior to when dispersal orders were issued, which The Nation characterized as "a plainly ludicrous claim, since no protester would have been able to procure tear gas ahead of the action."

The political left has been critical of Sherrill's response, calling her actions a betrayal and viewing them as cooperation with ICE. After May 29, one protester's sign read "we asked Mikie Sherrill for help, and she tear gassed us." Status Coup journalist Jordan Chariton said "this is why Democrats continue to lose the faith of the American people. This is why even with Trump in power, Democrats have such low favorability ratings in Congress." The political director of the American Civil Liberties Union New Jersey said the NJSP's actions were "an unnecessary response to free speech and the right to peaceful protest," accusing police of "[mimicking] the dangerous and overly militarized tactics of the federal government." Senior Slate writer Aymann Ismail said Sherrill had escalated the situation.

Also on May 29, former Border Patrol officer Gregory Bovino — who led heavy-handed responses to the Operation Metro Surge protests — posted on X saying "ICE Agents at Delaney, hang in there" and to "Give them hell," attaching an image of himself making a gesture described by news editor Charles R. Davis as a Nazi salute.

==== May 31 ====
External May 31 footage
- Police run towards protesters before kettle — Status Coup
- Police begin the kettle — Status Coup
- Police begin the kettle — Mercado Media
- Police tighten the kettle — Status Coup
- Police order press to leave the kettle — Status Coup
- Police in altercation with journalist — Mercado Media

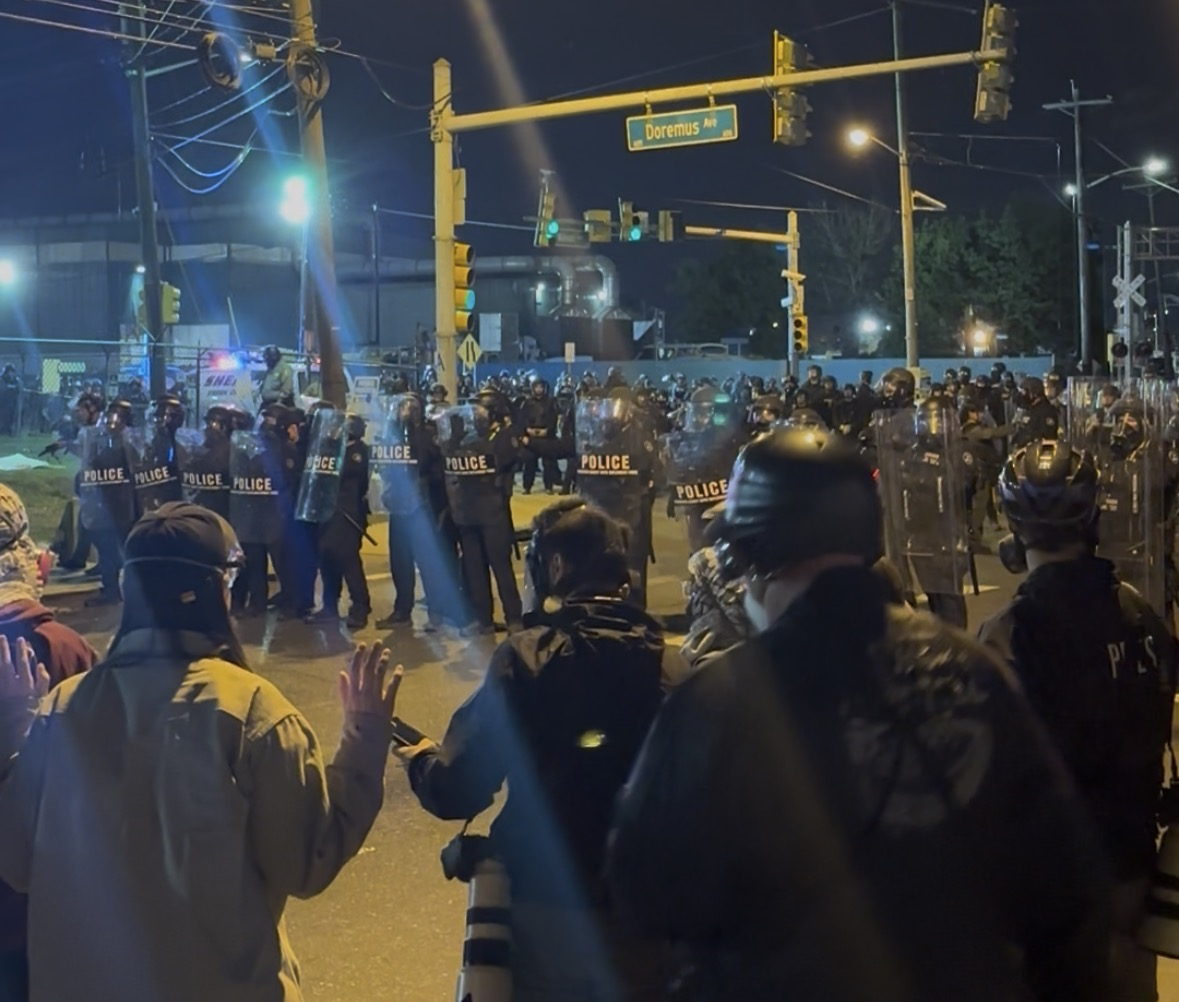
- NJSP in riot gear outside the facility shortly before kettling and arresting 61 protesters and journalists, May 31, 2026
- NJSP kettle protesters and journalists
- NJSP arrest a protester sitting down inside the kettle
- Protesters sing We Shall Not Be Moved during the kettle, May 31, 2026

On the morning of Sunday May 31, Newark mayor Ras Baraka announced an overnight curfew imposed by the Newark Police Division (NPD) in half-mile radius surrounding Delaney Hall between the hours of 9:00pm and 6:00am. Sherrill supported the curfew, saying "violent, chaotic clashes hurt everyone. They put the lives of both protesters and law enforcement in danger. They take the focus away from the people inside Delaney Hall and their families. And they raise the temperature with ICE." At around the same time, the Department of Homeland Security (DHS) posted on X saying the area around the facility had been secured and that they "WON'T BACK DOWN."

An hour before the curfew, military-grade armored vehicles arrived on the scene. At 8:30pm, the New Jersey State Police (NJSP) issued a verbal warning about the curfew in English and Spanish, prompting many to disperse. Shortly after, a line of NJSP riot police with riot shields blocked every exit on the street. At around 10pm, hundreds of riot police began running and surrounded over 61 peaceful protesters and members of the press in a kettle. Some members of the media reported being run out of the area.

Inside the kettle, a senior officer emerged from behind the shields and said "Listen up. If you are press, you got the opportunity right now — and that's it — to leave. If you don't leave out here in an orderly fashion, you are coming with us." He then pointed at someone in the group and snapped "You are not press."

After the announcement, protesters began chanting "Press don't leave!" After members of the press were escorted from the kettle, they were chased away by police until they were about 100 feet (30 meters) from the kettle. The NPD then ordered press to go even further down the road from where they were recording the kettle, prompting objections and a confrontation. Over an officer's radio, a voice said "If they refuse to move, push them back yourselves."

Everyone who remained in the kettle was arrested, making for 61 total arrests. During the arrests, riot police tightened the kettle, "cramming journalists and protesters closer together." Multiple members of the press were denied exit, including a conservative commentator who ended up with a black eye. At least three journalists in the kettle were arrested and spent a full day in custody while lawyers were denied access to see them. One of the arrested journalists, wearing a blue vest with the word "press" and an ID from his company dangled around his neck, was a member of the National Press Photographers Association. He was arrested by officers after being told his credentials were not verified. The Guardian later asked the governor's office and mayor's office what "verified" credentials meant and did not receive a response. Another of the arrested journalists was injured and taken to a hospital, where he said two arrested protesters were also being treated for injuries from the arrests. One journalist claimed they were charged with felony rioting and resisting arrest. The Freedom of the Press Foundation member said after the incident, "at least three of those arrested ended up in the hospital. Do I really need to explain why press cameras needed to be rolling?"

The New Jersey Office of the Public Defender (OPD) said all of the complaints they examined included fourth-degree rioting and resisting arrest felony charges, which carry a maximum sentence of 18 months in prison. The people arrested were taken to the Essex County Correctional Facility and held for over 24 hours because the NPD was slow to process them. The OPD said this was "unnecessary and really not something that happens very often," and the office said charging with felonies was a "big reach" based on the "kind of conduct we were seeing from protesters on the ground." A lawyer in the OPD said all the complaints he examined by police used "boilerplate language listing the offenses said to be committed by the crowd collectively, without offering detail on what any individual is accused of doing." He said "The police have not made out the barest minimum of probable cause," and the office said these cases were typically charged via summons rather than an arrest warrant.

Eighteen press freedom organizations co-signed a public condemnation of the arrests, including the American Society of Journalists and Authors (ASJA); Coalition For Women In Journalism (CFWIJ); Committee to Protect Journalists (CPJ); The Deadline Club; The Free Press (CBS News); Freedom of the Press Foundation (FPF); International Women's Media Foundation (IWMF); Investigative Reporters and Editors (IRE); National Press Photographers Association (NPPA); National Press Club (NPC), including the National Press Club Journalism Institute; New York Press Club (NYPC); New Jersey Society of Professional Journalists; PEN America; Radio Television Digital News Association (RTDNA); Reporters Without Borders (RSF); Society of Environmental Journalists (SEJ); and Society of Professional Journalists (SPJ). The letter alleged First Amendment violations by law enforcement and demanded the dropping of charges against journalists arrested. The committee to Protect Journalists said "This type of behavior has no place in a democracy." The Free Press said arrests of journalists were intended to "chill coverage" of abuses during the arrests. Reporters Without Borders said "these attacks are unconstitutional repression typical of an authoritarian regime."

Shortly after the arrests, New Jersey Attorney General Jennifer Davenport issued a statement thanking police for "de-escalating" the situation and saying those arrested were "armed" with helmets, shields, and gas masks. DHS retweeted a post on X bragging about kettling the protesters. Baraka lifted the curfew the next day.

The OPD, representing roughly 40 out of the 61 people arrested, said over half of arrestees were approached by Federal Bureau of Investigation (FBI) agents for questioning after the FBI obtained arrestee telephone records and address information from criminal complaints from the arrests. The OPD claimed friends and family of arrestees were approached, and the FBI also arrived outside their apartments for knock and talks. The OPD argued this violated their right to legal representation.

Governor Sherrill defended the police response at the protests. When a caller during a phone-in likened the state police response to Operation Metro Surge federal crackdowns in Minneapolis, Sherrill denied the comparison, saying "Nobody [was] certainly killed in this instance" (referring to the killings of Renée Good and Alex Pretti). The next day, protesters carried signs critical of Governor Sherrill, accusing her of making things worse and "lying about Delaney Hall." Protesters also chanted "Hey, Mikie, WTF?"

Baraka released a public statement condemning the actions of police over the weekend, saying the NJSP "kind of resembled what ICE was doing in the first place" and characterizing their behavior as "overly aggressive, unnecessary and in some cases, unconstitutional."

== Core functions ==
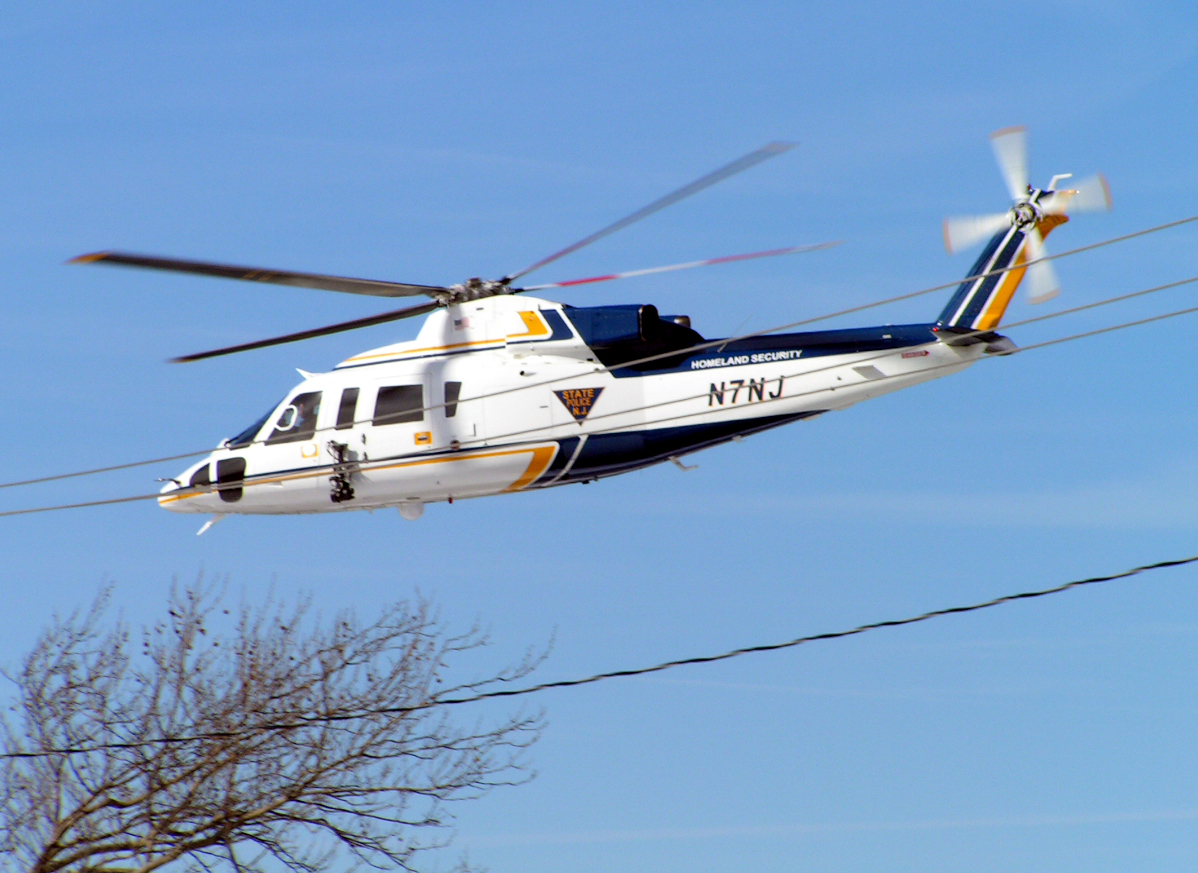
A NJ State Police helicopter in 2005

The New Jersey State Police is responsible for general police services, general highway and traffic enforcement, statewide investigation and intelligence services, emergency management, support for state and local law enforcement efforts, maintenance of criminal records and identification systems and regulation of certain commerce such as firearms ownership.

Many municipalities in southern and north-western New Jersey lack local police departments, therefore the state police have the primary responsibility for providing police services to these towns for a yearly assessed nominal fee paid to the state government. The New Jersey State Police is also charged with the responsibility of protecting the Governor of New Jersey and Lieutenant Governor of New Jersey, as well as the President of the New Jersey Senate and the Speaker of the New Jersey General Assembly.

Training for recruits takes place at the State Police Academy located in Sea Girt, New Jersey. The curriculum consists of ten units of study that increase in difficulty and complexity over the 24 weeks of training.

NJSP is one third of the participants of a traffic management center called STMC (Statewide Traffic Management Center) located in Woodbridge, NJ. STMC is also the home to New Jersey Department of Transportation and the New Jersey Turnpike Authority. The STMC is staffed 24/7 and is responsible for the coordination and logistics of statewide resources during major incidents within the State of New Jersey.

== Equipment ==
=== Current equipment ===
Name	Type	Caliber	Origin	Notes
Glock 45 Gen6	Pistol	9mm	Austria	Standard Issue. Equipped with Aimpoint Macro Red Dots and weapon mounted flashlights.
Benelli M4	Shotgun	12 Gauge	Italy	Standard Issue
Colt M4 Enhanced Patrol Rifle	Patrol Rifle	5.56mm	United States	Troopers assigned to local municipality barracks, Technical Emergency And Mission Specialists (TEAMS) Unit, and Homeland Security.

=== Previously issued equipment ===
- Glock 17 Gen4 (2016–2025)
- Glock 19 Gen4 (2016–2025)
- SIG Sauer P229 9mm (2014–2016)
- SIG Sauer P228 9mm (2000–2014)
- Heckler & Koch P7 (-2000)
- Ruger Security Six .357 Magnum (1982-)
- Benelli M1 shotgun (before 2024)

== Rank structure ==
Title	Insignia
Colonel (Superintendent)	
Lieutenant Colonel (Deputy Superintendent)	
Major	
Captain	
Lieutenant	
Sergeant First Class	
Detective Sergeant First Class	
Staff Sergeant	
Sergeant / Detective Sergeant	
Trooper I / Detective I	
Trooper II / Detective II	

== Uniform ==
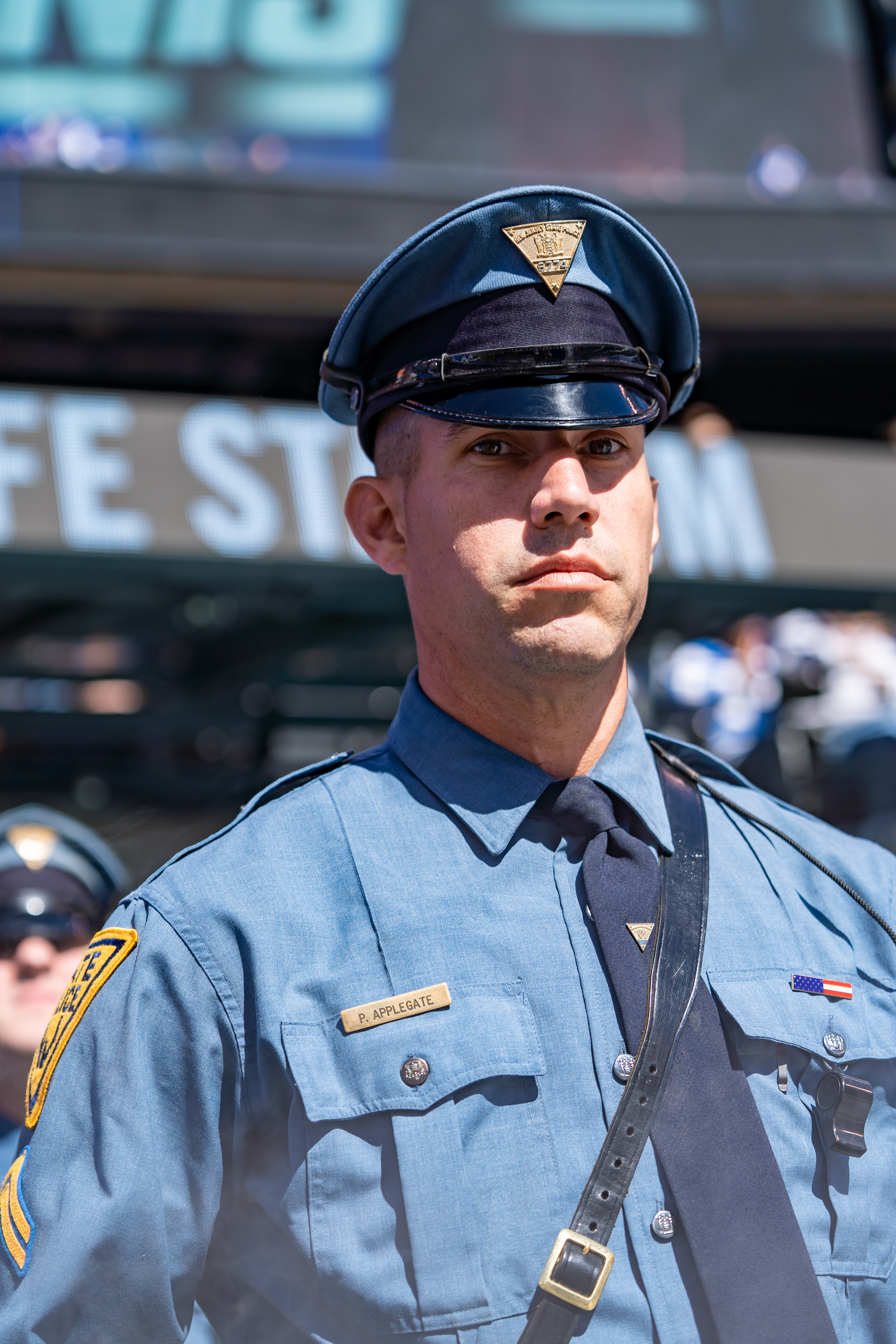
Trooper in uniform at a New York Giants football game

In addition to its distinctive triangular badge, Troopers wear a distinctive uniform for regular patrol duties, which is normally reserved for "Class A" functions in nearby state police forces (Delaware, New York, and Pennsylvania). The uniform originated from Schwarzkopf's time in the U.S. Army Cavalry. The winter uniform consists of a French blue Army-style coat, known as a blouse, with brass buttons, and gold triangular patches, with "N.J." on the right lapel and "S.P." on the left. The blouse is worn over a dress shirt, light blue for sergeants and below, white for lieutenants and above, and a navy blue necktie. Navy blue trousers or riding breeches bearing a gold stripe on each side completes the uniform. During the summer, the blouse is replaced with a long-sleeve blue shirt, while a necktie is still worn. A saucer-shaped hat (as opposed to a Stetson hat in New York and Maryland or the Campaign hat in Delaware and Pennsylvania) is worn, with two straps—one going over the crown, giving the uniform a distinctive, imposing appearance. The NJSP is one of only five state police forces that do not wear a badge on their uniform shirts; the Troopers' badge is only worn on their hat. For this reason, it is unusual to see a Trooper without his/her cover on. Enlisted Troopers wear their applicable rank on the sleeves while officers wear their rank on shoulder epaulets. Additionally, both winter and summer uniforms are worn with the full Sam Browne belt, if a belt-mounted sidearm is worn, unusual for a North American police agency's patrol uniform due to cited safety concerns. The full Sam Browne belt was adopted by Col. Schwarzkopf, as the belt gave the wearer a proper "brace" (known by General of the Armies John Pershing as the "West Point Brace;" appropriate at the time since Pershing and Schwarzkopf were both graduates).

== Current organization ==
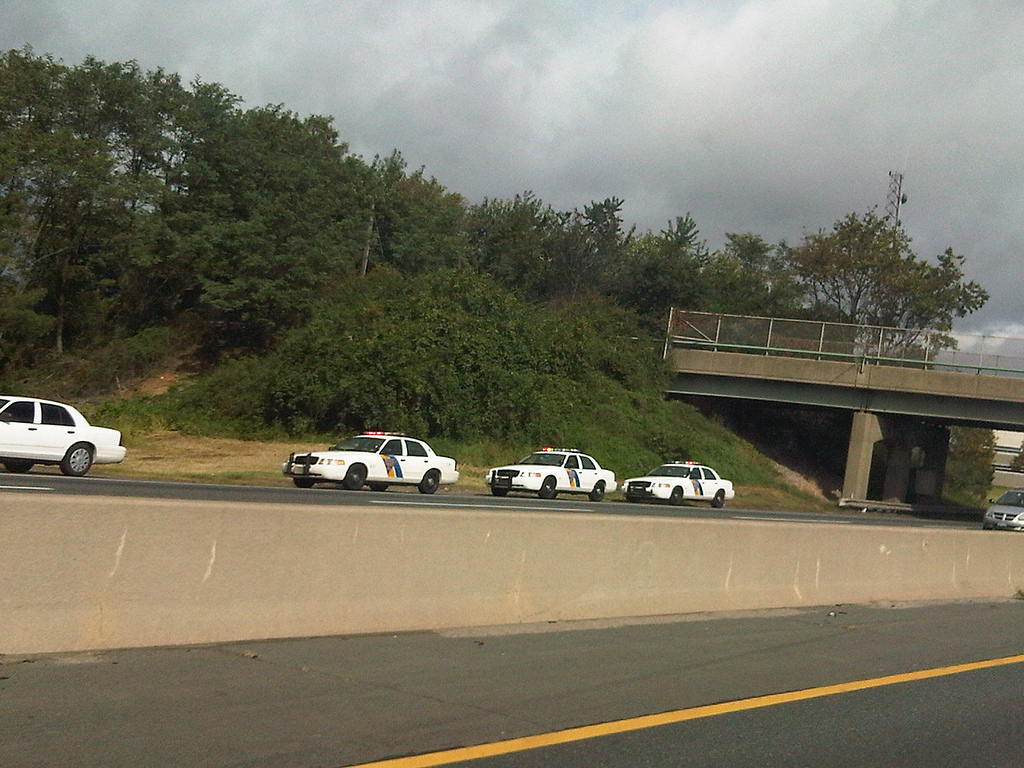
State Police cars parked on the shoulder of the New Jersey Turnpike

The current organization of the New Jersey State Police is:

- Office of the Superintendent, which is currently held by Lt. Col. (Ret.) Jeanne Hengemuhle .
- Administration Branch, which consists of the Administration Section, Information Technology Section, and the Division Human Resources Section
- Homeland Security Branch, which consists of the Emergency Management Section and the Special Operations Section.
- The Investigations Branch which consists of the Intelligence Section and the Special Investigations Section
- The Operations Branch, which consists of Field Operations Sections which are further divided into the following four troops:
  - Troop A: Southern New Jersey (including the Atlantic City Expressway)
  - Troop B: Northern New Jersey
  - Troop C: Central New Jersey
  - Troop D: New Jersey Turnpike, Garden State Parkway (Note: The Parkway was formerly patrolled by Troop E before its merger with Troop D.)

This department is a member of the New York-New Jersey Regional Fugitive Task Force.

== Line of duty deaths ==
As of 2026, 83 officers of the NJSP have been killed in the line of duty.

== Demographics ==
As of 2021, the demographics of the New Jersey State Police were as follows:

- Male: 65%
- Female: 35%
- Non-Binary: 0-3%
- White: 68%
- African-American/Black: 17%
- Hispanic: 11%
- Asian: 3%
- Two or More Races: 1%
- Native American/American Indian: 0%
- Alaskan Native/Native Hawaiian: 0%

== Law enforcement accreditation ==
The New Jersey State Police, as of July 2007, received a coveted law enforcement accreditation after more than a year of intense reviews and grading. The Commission on Accreditation for Law Enforcement Agencies (CALEA) bestowed the honor at a meeting of their commissioners in Montreal, Quebec.

The award is the culmination of a two-year process that included on-site inspections from a national team representing the commission. Assessors examined files, conducted panel interviews of staff members, inspected facilities, and performed ride-a-longs with troopers.

== In popular culture ==
The novel Expressway (1973) by Elleston Trevor, writing under the pseudonym "Howard North," is set during a busy 4th of July weekend, and depicts a group of New Jersey State Troopers trying to keep a lid on crime and traffic problems during that period. It was adapted into a TV movie titled Smash-Up on Interstate 5, changing the setting from a New Jersey turnpike to a California freeway, and changing the police from New Jersey State Troopers to officers of the California Highway Patrol.

Bruce Springsteen's album Nebraska (1982) contains the dark song "State Trooper" in which a traveller on the New Jersey Turnpike, a desperate man who has committed unknown crimes, hopes that he won't be pulled over by a State Trooper. This song was used in The Sopranos.

New Jersey Turnpike ridin' on a wet night 'neath the refinery's glow, out where the great black rivers flow
License, registration, I ain't got none but I got a clear conscience 'Bout the things I done
Mister state trooper, please don't stop me
Please don't stop me, please don't stop me!

In the 2009 film Paul Blart: Mall Cop, Kevin James plays a mall security guard who dreams of becoming a New Jersey State Trooper. In the beginning of the film, he is taking the entry course in the police academy and several training instructors are seen as well as some officers in dress uniforms in the background.

== See also ==
- List of law enforcement agencies in New Jersey
- State Police (United States)
- State Patrol
- Highway Patrol
