= Robert W. Greene =

American journalist

- Born: Robert William Greene, Sr. July 12, 1929; New York City, U.S.
- Died: April 10, 2008 (aged 78); Smithtown, New York, U.S.
- Occupation: Journalist

Robert William Greene Sr. (July 12, 1929 – April 10, 2008) was a pioneering investigative journalist, who uncovered corruption in Arizona after a journalist, Don Bolles, was murdered there and twice helped Newsday win the Pulitzer Prize for Public Service. He spent 37 years as a reporter and editor at Newsday.

== Biography ==
=== Early life ===
He was born on July 12, 1929, in Jamaica, Queens. He won his first Pulitzer Prize in 1970, for exposing land scandals on Long Island. Greene's daughter, Lea Greene, was murdered in 1989 during a break-in at her home.

=== Education ===
Greene attended Fordham University for two years.

=== Career ===
Greene worked for The Jersey Journal for many years as a reporter. Prior to working for Newsday, he worked as an investigator for the New York City Anti-Crime Committee. He joined Newsday in 1955. While working here, he worked various editing positions. Greene was most famous for his investigative work in what became known as the Arizona Project. The Arizona Project revealed how The Arizona Republic reporter, Don Bolles, was killed in a car bombing. Greene was a member of the Investigative Reporters and Editors, a national organization he helped start. He retired from Newsday in 1992. Upon retiring, he then began teaching courses in journalism at Hofstra University and State University of New York at Stony Brook.

=== Awards and honors ===
- 1970- Pulitzer Prize for Newsday under Greene for his work exposing land scandals where politicians were investing in properties and increasing property values.
- 1974- Pulitzer Prize for his work on "The Heroin Trail"

== Family ==
Greene was the son of Francis, a lawyer, and Mary Clancy Greene. He was married to his wife Kathleen and together they had a son and four grandchildren. Their son's name is Robert Jr. The family lived in Kings Park, New York.

=== Death ===
Greene died on April 10, 2008, aged 78 in Smithtown, New York. The cause of his death was from heart failure. Survivors include Greene's wife, Kathleen Greene, son, Robert Greene Jr., and great nephew, Caleb Greene. Robert Greene Jr. said one of his father's last wishes was to see a journalism boot camp for high school journalists established at Stony Brook University, where the award-winning journalist had most recently been teaching courses, and in 2009, Stony Brook established the Robert W. Greene Summer Institute for High School Journalists.
