= James Knowles =

James Knowles may refer to:

- James Sheridan Knowles (1784–1862), Irish dramatist and actor
- James Thomas Knowles (1806–1884), English architect
- James Thomas Knowles (1831–1908), English architect and editor of The Nineteenth Century
- James Knowles (aviator) (1896–1971), World War I ace
- James Knowles (footballer, born 1881) (1881–1923), English footballer
- James Knowles (lexicographer) (1759–1840), Irish schoolteacher and lexicographer, father of James Sheridan Knowles
- Jim Knowles (American football) (born 1965), defensive coordinator at Tennessee
- Jim Knowles (football manager), manager of Tranmere Rovers, 1936–1939
- Jimmy Knowles (baseball) (1856–1912), baseball player
- James Knowles (murderer), Ku Klux Klan member responsible for the lynching of Michael Donald
- James Knowles III (born 1980), mayor of Ferguson, Missouri
- James Hinton Knowles, British missionary to Kashmir
- Jimmy Knowles (footballer) (born 2002), English footballer playing for Accrington Stanley F.C.
