= Richard Neal (disambiguation) =

Richard Neal is a United States representative from Massachusetts's 1st congressional district, formerly numbered as the 2nd district.

Richard Neal may also refer to:

- Richard Neal (American football) (1947–1983), American football defensive end
- Richard I. Neal (1942–2022), U.S. Marine Corps general
- Richard Neal (police officer) (1940–2021), police commissioner of Philadelphia, Pennsylvania, 1992–1998

== See also ==
- Dick Neal (disambiguation)
- Richard Neile (1562–1640), English bishop
- Richard Neill (1875–1970), American actor
- Richard FitzNeal (died 1198), churchman and bureaucrat in the service of Henry II of England
