= Camden County Police Department =

- Abbreviation: CCPD
- Motto: Service Before Self

Agency overview
- Formed: May 1, 2013
- Preceding agency: Camden Police Department

Jurisdictional structure
- Operations jurisdiction: Camden, New Jersey, USA
- Foreground: Camden County, New Jersey, with the City of Camden highlighted. Background: New Jersey, with Camden County highlighted.
- Area: 11.4 square miles (30 km^{2})
- Population: 77,344
- Governing body: Camden County Board of Chosen Freeholders
- General nature: Local civilian police

Operational structure
- Headquarters: 800 Federal St. Camden, NJ 08103
- Officers: 401
- Ambassadors: 70-100
- Agency executive: Gabriel Rodriguez, Chief of Police

Facilities
- Mobile observation platforms: Sky Patrol

Website
- camdencountypd.org

The Camden County Police Department (CCPD) is a county police department providing law enforcement services to the city of Camden, Camden County, New Jersey and as of October 1, 2024 Woodlynne, New Jersey; replacing its police department due to staffing shortage. The Camden County Police Department was formed on May 1, 2013. It is the successor to the Camden Police Department.

Then-chief Scott Thomson used the disbanding and replacement to transform the department's policies. Camden's new department has been called "a model" of how to reform police departments. It is sometimes referred to as the Metro Division even though, unlike many other metropolitan police forces in the United States, it presently does not patrol outside of the city. As a "county police" force, the department is available to all municipalities in Camden County on a voluntary basis; however, no other municipalities within Camden County have announced plans to join the county police district.

Journalist Ryan Cooper described Camden's County Police as an example of community policing following the example of Nordic countries.

== Background ==
In January 2011, the city department laid off 168 of the department's 370 officers when contract negotiations stalled and the city was facing a budget shortfall. Camden experienced a spike in homicides, and the city police department wanted to hire more patrol officers but couldn't afford to, "partly because of generous union contracts." According to CNN the corruption had also "rendered the existing agency unfixable." On August 2, 2011, the City of Camden and Camden County announced that the city police department would be disbanded in favor of a new county police force. Well-known law enforcement executive John Timoney was retained to develop an organizational and functional plan for the department.

The creation of the county police force in place of the city force was expected to save between $14 and $16 million annually out of the $60 million budget of the city police department. Unlike the city police department it replaced, the new "county" department was not initially unionized. Savings were expected to come from reducing the fringe benefits that had been required under the city's union contract.

The move was endorsed by the Mayor of Camden, Dana Redd, who indicated that the new police department would be more cost-effective, and that the high absentee rate of city officers had affected the former department's ability to keep the city safe. An official of the Camden Fraternal Order of Police, which represented city police officers, described the plan as "union busting" and called it "a recipe for disaster" that would replace experienced city officers with new personnel unfamiliar with the city. A community group known as the Citizens' Community Committee for Public Safety, along with the Camden Fraternal Order of Police, criticized the plan as being political, not practical. The mayor's political opponents also criticized the disbandment of the city's department.

== Establishment of county department ==
In 2012, the entire city police department was laid off and required to apply for a position with the new county police department. The application process included a 50-page form, psychological testing, and an interview process. Many employees were angry. Then-chief Scott Thomson saw it as a way to "hit the reset button" and completely change how policing worked in Camden; he characterized the city force at the time as "apathetic, lethargic and corrupt". He envisioned transforming how Camden officers saw themselves from "Warrior" to "Guardian."

The new department took over primary responsibility for policing the City of Camden on May 1, 2013. 155 officers reapplied and were hired for the new department, while 65 officers refused to reapply. The members of the new "county" police force had lower salaries, along with fewer benefits, than they had received from the city. The new department reached its full complement of 401 sworn officers on June 7, 2013, when 92 recruits were commissioned. The new force doubled the size of the previous city force.

Thomson announced that officers would no longer be judged on how many tickets they wrote or arrests they made but on relationships they developed in the community and whether citizens felt safe enough to sit on their front steps or allow their children to ride their bikes in the street. Thomson told the New York Times in 2017 that "aggressive ticket writing" was a sign that officers weren't understanding the new department, saying "handing a $250 ticket to someone who is making $13,000 a year can be life altering." On new recruits' first day, they knock on doors in the neighborhood they're assigned to and introduce themselves.

The initial strategy was to have as many officers walking and biking the streets as possible to discourage drug traffickers; as citizens felt safer and began occupying public spaces again, a critical mass of well-intentioned citizens was sufficient to keep the drug traffickers away and police pulled back on their presence. Thomson also adopted new policies on use-of-force and "scoop and go", which instructs officers to load injured people into their cruisers to take them to the hospital if calling for an ambulance would cause a delay. The use-of-force policy, which the department had drafted with help from New York University Law School’s Policing Project and which was supported by the New Jersey ACLU and the Fraternal Order of Police, was called by experts the "most progressive" such policy to date, according to the Washington Post in 2019.

As part of the overall strategy for the city, abandoned buildings being used as drug houses were torn down. On October 1, 2013, the results of a vote by County Police officers to unionize were announced. By a margin of two votes, the New Jersey Fraternal Order of Police (NJFOP) was selected to represent the officers. The previous month, superior officers voted to be represented by the NJFOP. After the implementations both complaints of excessive force and violent crimes decreased. In 2019 Bloomberg reported that excessive force complaints had dropped by 95%. In 2020 CNN reported the violent crime rate had dropped by 42%.

== Sky Patrol ==
In June 2013, the department deployed a mobile observation platform called "Sky Patrol," which contains surveillance cameras and thermal imaging cameras and can be elevated 35 feet (11 m) into the air to help monitor crime. It was procured with $135,000 in forfeited funds. The maker of the system, FLIR Systems, claims that it can enable a single officer to see more than three-quarters of a mile (1.2 km) and oversee an area that would normally require five officers. A spokesman for the Camden County Prosecutor acknowledged that the system could see into homes. Criminal lawyers and civil libertarians have raised concerns that use of the system may conflict with citizens' expectation of privacy.

== Ambassadors ==
On June 20, 2013, the Camden County Board of Chosen Freeholders approved the addition of a private force of civilian ambassadors to provide a security presence and serve as the eyes and ears of the police department in Camden's downtown shopping district. A contract was entered with the private security firm AlliedBarton to provide 70 to 100 ambassadors when state funds become available.

== Crime in Camden ==
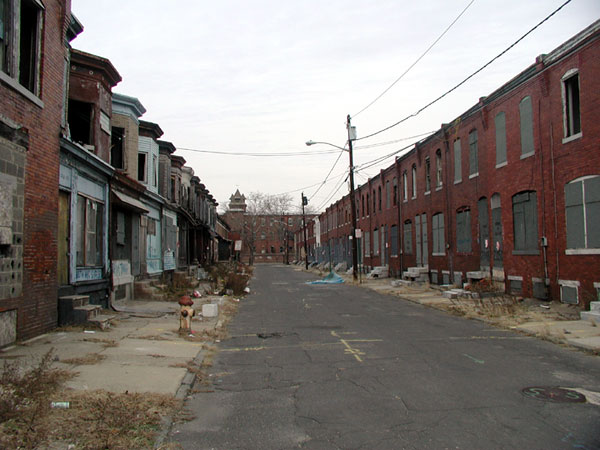
Urban decay in Camden

For many years, Camden had one of the highest homicide rates in the nation. However, crime in Camden has fallen considerably since 2012.

In 2004, 2005, and 2009, Camden was ranked America's "most dangerous city" by CQ Press, which ranks cities based on reported murder, rape, robbery, aggravated assault, burglary, and motor vehicle theft data.

In 2008, Camden had 2,333 violent crimes for every 100,000 residents, compared to the national rate of 455.

On October 29, 2012, the FBI announced Camden was ranked first in violent crime per capita of cities with over 50,000 residents, surpassing Flint, Michigan. That year, there were 67 homicides in Camden.

By 2019, homicides had declined to 25, a 63% decrease. This coincided with wide-ranging reforms by the new police department.

By 2022, overall crime rates had declined even further still, although the murder rate had increased slightly, to its 2016 levels, after falling in both 2020 and 2021, as the city (and country more generally) reopened following the height of both the COVID-19 pandemic, and persistent tensions surrounding the 2020 presidential election; the overall count of non-violent crimes committed within city limits also returned to its 2019 levels by the end of 2022, somewhat offsetting the continued drop in violent crime in the city generally under its new police force that kept overall crime rates near 50-year lows.

== Misconduct ==
On October 28, 2014, Officer Ashley Bailey was fired and arrested on corruption charges involving a $1.2 million illegal drug ring. She was sentenced in January 2018 to eight years in the state prison with no chance of parole earlier than five years.
