= Camden Police Department (defunct) =

- Abbreviation: CPD

Agency overview
- Dissolved: 2013
- Superseding agency: Camden County Police Department

Jurisdictional structure
- Operations jurisdiction: Camden, New Jersey, USA
- Area: 11.4 square miles (30 km^{2})
- Population: 77,344
- General nature: Local civilian police

Operational structure
- Headquarters: Camden, New Jersey
- Agency executive: Scott Thomson, Chief of Police

Website
- Camden Police site

The Camden Police Department (CPD) was the primary civilian law enforcement agency in Camden, New Jersey, until it was dissolved on May 1, 2013, when the Camden County Police Department Metro Division took over full responsibility for policing the city of Camden.

== Crime in Camden ==
Camden consistently ranked among the cities in the United States with the highest crime rate based on FBI statistics. In 2008, Camden had 2,333 violent crimes for every 100,000 residents, compared to the national rate of 455. Camden was ranked America's "most dangerous city" in 2004, 2005, and 2009 by CQ Press, which ranks cities based on reported murder, rape, robbery, aggravated assault, burglary, and motor vehicle theft data.

== History ==
=== 1996 audit ===
In 1996, public criticism of mismanagement and corruption in the Camden Police Department, coupled with high crime rates led state and city administrations to order an audit. The department had previously been audited in 1962, 1982, and 1986. The audit found that Camden had a higher rate of index crimes than any other major city in New Jersey, with a domestic violence incident rate nearly three times the national average. In their investigation, the audit team reported that information provided by the Camden police was often inconsistent or incomplete. The final report included 75 recommendations and was released in March 1996. In the two years after the audit, 90% of the recommendations had been implemented and the city had saved over $500,000.

=== Drug enforcement corruption probe ===
In 2010, a federal investigation alleged that former Camden Police Officer Kevin Parry and four other officers planted drugs during illegal searches, pocketed the money, and framed suspects. Kevin Parry pleaded guilty in the case, admitting a role in charges being overturned or dismissed in 185 drug cases. Lawsuit settlements totaling $3.5 million were paid to 88 victims. Three other Camden officers, Jason Stetser, Antonio Figaro, and Dan Morris also pleaded guilty and were sentenced to prison over the scandal.

=== Budget shortfall ===
In 2005, the Camden Police Department was operated by the state. In 2011, it was announced that a new county police department would be formed, which would only patrol areas inside the city.

For two years, Camden experienced its lowest homicide rate since 2008. Camden also reorganized its police disbandment that same year. In 2011, Camden's total budget was $167 million and the budget for the Camden police was $65 million, while the total tax revenue for the city of Camden was only $24 million. Financial aid from the state had supplemented the city's funds, but that was discontinued. Camden was rated No. 5 nationwide for homicides with approximately 87 murders per 100,000 residents in 2012. The city added crime-fighting tactics like surveillance cameras, better street lighting, and curfews for children. Although they added these tactics, the number of murders had risen again. As a last resort, officers were only authorized to use handguns and handcuffs.

Robberies, property crimes, nonfatal shooting incidents, violent crimes, and aggravated assaults have declined since 2012. In November 2012, Camden began the process of terminating 273 officers to later hire 400 new officers, out of the 2,000 applicants that have already submitted letters of interest to the county, to have a fresh start of a larger, non-unionized group to safeguard the nation's poorest city. The city's officers rejected a contract proposal from the county that would have allowed approximately all 260 Camden county's police officers to Camden Police Metro Division, to only 49% of them to be eligible to be rehired once the 141-year-old department becomes disbanded.

In January 2011, the department laid off 168 of the department's 370 officers when contract negotiations stalled and the city was facing a budget shortfall. Camden experienced a spike in homicides, and the city police department wanted to hire more patrol officers but couldn't afford to partly due to generous union contracts. According to CNN the corruption had also "rendered the existing agency unfixable." On August 2, 2011, the City of Camden and Camden County announced that the city police department would be disbanded in favor of a new county police force. Well-known law enforcement executive John Timoney was retained to develop an organizational and functional plan for the department.

The creation of the county police force in place of the city force was expected to save between $14 and $16 million annually out of the $60 million budget of the city police department. Unlike the city police department it replaced, the new "county" department was not initially unionized. Savings were expected to come from reducing the fringe benefits that had been required under the city's union contract.

The move was endorsed by the Mayor of Camden, Dana Redd, who indicated that the new police department would be more cost-effective, and that the high absentee rate of city officers had affected the former department's ability to keep the city safe. An official of the Camden Fraternal Order of Police, which represented city police officers, described the plan as "union busting" and called it "a recipe for disaster" that would replace experienced city officers with new personnel unfamiliar with the city. A community group known as the Citizens' Community Committee for Public Safety, along with the Camden Fraternal Order of Police, criticized the plan as being political, not practical. The mayor's political opponents also criticized the disbandment of the city's department.

=== Disbandment ===
On August 2, 2012, the city of Camden and Camden County announced that the department would be disbanded in favor of a new county police department, the Camden County Police Department. The new department took over for the Camden Police Department on May 1, 2013. In mid-March 2013, Camden residents would have noticed the first changes once the first group of officers became employed, and were in an eight-week field of training on the Camden streets. Although the homicide rate averaged 48 since 2008, in April 2013 the city reported 57 homicides in a population of 77,000, compared to 67 homicides in 2012. Like other county-wide police forces in the nation, this new department will be available to any other municipality in the county who wishes to disband its police forces and join the county police district.

== Special Operations squad ==
The Special Operations squad coordinated specialized resources to aid police in daily field activities and special occurrences. The CPD operated the following forces:

- K-9 Unit
- S.W.A.T. team
- Special Victims Unit
- Domestic Violence Unit
- Auto Squad
- Detective Bureau
- HIDTA
- Anti-Crime Partnership
- Marine Bureau
- Mounted Horse Unit
- Smash Team Unit
- Tactical Negotiations Unit (TNT)
- Patrol Division North
- Patrol Bureau South
- Patrol Unit Central
