= Delrish Moss =

Delrish Moss is currently the Police of Chief for the Miramar Police department. He’s a former law enforcement Captain with the Florida International University Police Department.

Previously, in March 2016, Moss was appointed as the Chief of Police of Ferguson Police Department (Missouri) of Ferguson, Missouri. When Moss was officially sworn in on May 9, 2016, he became the first permanent African American chief in Ferguson. Ferguson is a suburb of St. Louis where the 2014 shooting of Michael Brown served as a catalyst for the Black Lives Matter movement. He resigned from this position in October 2018 to return to Miami.

== Early life and education ==
Moss was born in Miami, Florida. He graduated from Miami High School in 1982. Growing up in Overtown, he witnessed violence in the community and was once frisked by a Miami police officer for no apparent reason. Moss says his motivation to eventually become a police officer was that he "wanted to teach police how to treat people."

== Career ==
In 1984, Moss worked as a public service aide for Miami Police Department and decided to pursue a career in law enforcement. Within three years, he was a patrolman on the streets of Miami's historically black communities, Overtown, Liberty City, Allapattah and Coconut Grove. He was promoted to homicide detective in 1989. In 1995, then-Police Chief Donald Warsaw convinced Moss to become a spokesman for the city.

In that role, Moss caught national attention when he spoke for the police department while Little Havana suffered violence and fires in 2000 after federal agents took Elian Gonzalez. Moss handled communications in 2005, when Miami Commissioner Arthur Teele Jr. killed himself in the Miami Herald building. Police Chief John Timoney added Moss to his executive team in 2009. In 2011, Moss was promoted to major by Police Chief Manuel Orosa. Moss led the Miami Police Department's Public Information/Community Relations division, reporting directly to the Chief of Police. Orosa credited Moss for contributing to the improved relationship between Miami's African-American communities and the police department. Moss was active in community outreach, moving important relationships from tense to productive.

Moss has over 30 years of experience. He was appointed to the Police Chief position in Ferguson over 53 other applicants.

Moss was sworn in just weeks after a federal judge approved Ferguson's agreement with the United States Department of Justice, created to resolve racial bias in the town's criminal justice system. Moss focused his effort in Missouri to implement reforms, some of which were mandated by the U.S. Department of Justice.

He served as president of the Miami Police Athletic League and is a member of the NAACP.
