= Ella Jones =

Mayor of Ferguson, Missouri, USA

12th Mayor of Ferguson
- Incumbent
- Assumed office June 17, 2020
- Preceded by: James Knowles III

Personal details
- Born: 1955 (age 70–71)
- Party: Democratic
- Education: University of Missouri–St. Louis (BA)

Ella Jones (born 1955) is an American chromatographer, pastor, and politician who serves as the 12th mayor of Ferguson, Missouri. A former member of the Ferguson City Council, Jones is the first African-American and woman elected mayor of the city.

== Education ==
Jones earned a Bachelor of Arts degree in chemistry from the University of Missouri–St. Louis.

== Career ==
Prior to entering politics, Jones was a high-pressure liquid chromatographer. She worked at the Washington University School of Medicine and KV Pharmaceutical before becoming a sales director with Mary Kay. In April 2015, Jones was elected to the Ferguson City Council, where she represented the city's first ward. In February 2020, Jones was selected to serve on the United States Environmental Protection Agency Local Government Advisory Committee.

In the 2017 municipal election, Jones ran for mayor, receiving 42.77% of the vote. It was the city's first election after the shooting of Michael Brown and subsequent Ferguson unrest.

In the June 2, 2020, mayoral election, Jones defeated fellow council member Heather Robinett. Jones succeeded incumbent James Knowles III, a Republican who was unable to seek re-election due to term limits. On June 17, 2020, Jones was sworn in as the first black and female mayor of Ferguson. On April 4 2023, Jones was re-elected as mayor of Ferguson, winning a second term by 21 votes.

She is also a pastor in the African Methodist Episcopal Church.

== Electoral history ==
2020 Ferguson Mayoral Election
Party	Candidate	Votes	%
Democratic	Ella Jones	1,504	53.9%
Democratic	Heather Robinett	1,286	46.1%

== Personal life ==
Jones moved to Ferguson, Missouri with her husband, Tim. Tim Jones died in 2013. Jones has one daughter.

== See also ==
- List of first African-American mayors
