= Dick Neal =

Dick Neal is the name of:

- Dick Neal Sr. (1906–1986), English footballer
  - Dick Neal Jr. (1933–2013), his son and fellow footballer

== See also ==
- Richard Neal (disambiguation)
