= James Knowles III =

American Mayor of Ferguson, Missouri

James W. Knowles III
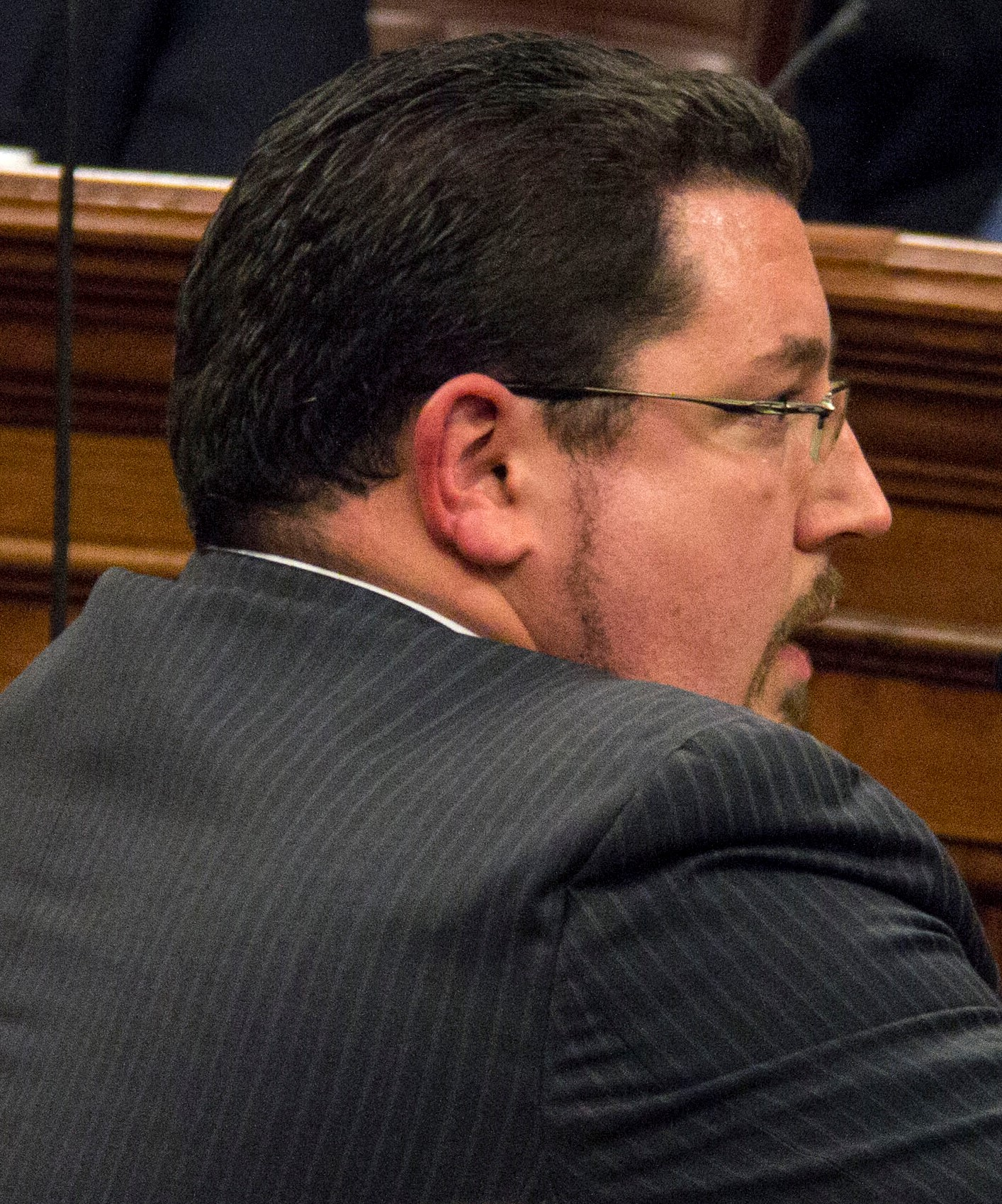

11th Mayor of Ferguson
- In office April 11, 2011 – June 17, 2020
- Preceded by: Brian Fletcher
- Succeeded by: Ella Jones

Personal details
- Born: July 20, 1979 (age 47) Ferguson, Missouri, U.S.
- Party: Republican
- Spouse: Lisa
- Children: 2
- Education: Truman State University (BA); University of Missouri–St. Louis (MPP)

James Wallace Knowles III (born July 20, 1979) is an American politician who served as the 11th Mayor of the city of Ferguson, Missouri, from April 2011 to June 2020.

== Early life and education ==
Knowles received bachelor's degrees in political science and criminal justice from Truman State University in Kirksville, Missouri in 2002. He graduated from the University of Missouri–St. Louis in 2008 with a master's degree in public policy administration.

== Career ==
Knowles is a former chairman of the Missouri Young Republicans. Knowles was a staff member for former Missouri state Senator and Democrat Ted House. He is a former employee of the Ferguson Police Department, serving nearly four years in the department's communications division.

Knowles served on the Ferguson city council prior to becoming mayor. Knowles was elected mayor in the nonpartisan election on April 5, 2011, winning 49% of the vote. He defeated two challengers, Pearce Neikirk, a realtor, and former Ferguson mayor Steve Wegert. Voter turnout for the April 2014 mayoral election was extremely low at just 12 percent. Knowles publicly expressed disappointment with the low voter turnout at an April 2014 city council meeting.

=== Mayor of Ferguson ===
Knowles became the youngest mayor in Ferguson's history when he took office at the age of 31. He was also believed to be one of youngest mayors in Missouri at the time. Knowles has defended the Ferguson Police Department in the aftermath of the shooting of Michael Brown in August 2014. He denied that Ferguson had a history of racism in an interview with MSNBC in 2014. An effort to recall Knowles was filed with the city on March 13, 2015. Knowles was re-elected mayor on April 4, 2017, with 57% of the vote.

Knowles was unable to run for re-election in 2020 due to term limits. He was succeeded by Ella Jones, the first black mayor of Ferguson in the city's history.

== Electoral history ==
2017 Ferguson Mayoral Election
| Party | Candidate | Votes | % |
|---|---|---|---|
| Nonpartisan | James W. Knowles, III | 2,133 | 57.23 |
| Nonpartisan | Ella Jones | 1,594 | 42.77 |

2014 Ferguson Mayoral Election
| Party | Candidate | Votes | % |
|---|---|---|---|
| Nonpartisan | James W. Knowles, III | 1,314 | 100 |

2011 Ferguson Mayoral Election
| Party | Candidate | Votes | % |
|---|---|---|---|
| Nonpartisan | James W. Knowles, III | 1,111 | 49.18 |
| Nonpartisan | Pearce Neikirk | 600 | 26.56 |
| Nonpartisan | Steven Wegert | 548 | 24.26 |
