= Richard Neal (police officer) =

American police officer (1940–2021)

Neal, c. 1992

Richard Neal Sr. (March 11, 1940 – December 11, 2021) was an American police officer who served as commissioner of Philadelphia, Pennsylvania, from 1992 to 1998.

== Biography ==
Neal was born in South Philadelphia. graduated from Edward W. Bok Technical High School in 1957. He worked at first at a sheet metal company in South Philadelphia, and joined the Police Department in 1962. After serving 36 years on the Philadelphia police force (including six years as Commissioner), Neal resigned under political pressure. He was replaced by John Timoney, former first deputy commissioner in New York City. Neal was subsequently hired as a security consultant by Drexel University and the Penn's Landing Corporation, a Philadelphia development group.

Neal meet his wife Delores when they were in junior high school, and they subsequently married in October 1962. They started their married life in the West Oak Lane section of Philadelphia and raised their two sons’ Richard Jr. and Jason in the Mount Airy section of Philadelphia.

On December 11, 2021, Neal died due to a stroke at Bryn Mawr Hospital, Pennsylvania, at the age of 81.

Police appointments
Preceded by Willie L. Williams	Commissioner of Philadelphia Police Department; 1992–1998	Succeeded by John Timoney
