= John Timoney (police officer) =

American police chief

John F. Timoney
- Timoney c. 1998
- Born: July 2, 1948; Dublin, Ireland
- Died: August 16, 2016 (aged 68); Miami, Florida, U.S.
- Police career
- Service years: Miami PD: 2003–2010; Philadelphia PD: 1998–2002; New York PD: 1967–1996
- Rank: 2003 – Chief of Police, Miami; 1998 – Commissioner, Philadelphia; 1995 – First Deputy Commissioner; 1994 – Chief of Department; 1992 – Deputy Chief; 1990 – Inspector; 1988 – Deputy Inspector; 1985 – Captain; 1983 – Lieutenant; 1980 – Sergeant; 1969 – Police Officer; 1967 – Police Trainee
- Other work: Law enforcement and security consultant

John Francis Timoney (July 2, 1948 – August 16, 2016) was an American policeman and law enforcement executive. He served as Chief of the Miami Police Department from 2003 to 2010. He was previously Commissioner of the Philadelphia Police Department (1998–2002) and held a variety of positions with the New York Police Department (1967–96), including its Chief of Department (senior sworn/uniformed position) and First Deputy Commissioner (second position). He worked for the Ministry of the Interior of Bahrain as a police consultant. Timoney drew both international praise and criticism for his handling of mass protests.

== Early life ==
Born Seán Francis Timoney on July 2, 1948, in Dublin, Ireland, he was brought up on Winetavern Street in The Liberties area of the city. He attended St. Audoen's National School on Cook Street.

In 1961, his family immigrated to New York City and settled in the Washington Heights, Manhattan. His father, Ciarán, died in 1966. while John and his younger brother (also named Ciarán) were attending Cardinal Hayes High School in the Bronx. In 1967, a month after Timoney's high school graduation, his mother and sister Marie returned to Ireland, but the two brothers remained, sharing an apartment and both working to support themselves. That summer, after passing the civil service exam, Timoney joined the New York Police Department as a police trainee. He changed his name from Seán to John at some point.

== Career ==
=== New York City ===
Since he was not yet 21, Timoney spent his first 18 months at NYPD assigned to clerical duties in the 17th Precinct before he started a six-month training program at the police academy, in February 1969. He was finally sworn in as a full-fledged police officer in July 1969 and was assigned to the 44th Precinct in the same Bronx neighborhood as his high school.

During his eight years as a patrol officer in the 44th Precinct, Timoney earned his bachelor's degree in American history from John Jay College of Criminal Justice in 1974, as well as a master's degree from Fordham University, also in American history. For some time, he considered becoming a high school history teacher, but ultimately decided otherwise. In June 1977, the NYPD transferred him to the Narcotics Division of the Organized Crime Control Bureau. Although formally based in the Bronx, the nature of this assignment allowed Timoney to follow cases throughout the city. He worked on a relatively entrepreneurial basis to penetrate complex drug organizations, assemble cases, and coordinate operations with various patrol precincts, detective squads, and specialized units.

Timoney took the NYPD Sergeant's exam twice, in 1973 and 1979. However, the department was going through a period of overall force reduction. That atmosphere, combined with his relatively brief tenure on the force, lack of veteran's preference points, and middling scores, delayed his promotion until 1980. Once a newly minted sergeant, Timoney was assigned to the 32nd Precinct, in Central Harlem.

In 1981, Timoney was awarded an NYPD scholarship to pursue a second master's degree (with a paid one-year leave of absence) in urban planning at Hunter College. In his 2010 biography, Timoney describes this as a turning point in his career, bringing him into contact with several influential academics (including Donna Shalala) and the entire field of public policy. Although he initially returned to duty as a sergeant in Harlem's 25th Precinct, only four months later he was reassigned as a research analyst for NYPD Chief of Operations Patrick V. Murphy, working on the review, revision, and dissemination of operational policies and procedures. During this time, Timoney worked particularly on the issues of high-speed police chases and police use of deadly force. When Murphy was promoted to first deputy commissioner in 1984 by incoming Commissioner Ben Ward, Timoney continued to work for the new Chief of Operations, Robert J. Johnston, Jr.

Timoney took the captain's exam in January 1985 and was promoted in the summer of that year and assigned as the executive officer of the 48th Precinct. He did not get along with the commanding officer there, but a quick transfer opportunity brought him to the 14th Precinct (Midtown South). There, he handled several high-profile issues, including a focus on cleaning up quality-of-life crimes in Bryant Park and overseeing security for the 40th anniversary United Nations General Assembly. After ten months as 14th Precinct Executive Officer, he was made Commanding Officer of the 5th Precinct (Chinatown, Little Italy and the Lower East Side), which was considered an assignment for high-potential NYPD leaders. In September 1987, Timoney was transferred again, this time to police headquarters, as Commanding Officer of the Chief of Department's Office (under Deputy Chief Tom Walsh).

In 1994, Timoney was promoted to Chief of Department after leading NYPD's Office of Management Analysis and Planning. A year later he became First Deputy Commissioner where he oversaw the merger of the New York Police Department with the Transit & Housing Police Departments. When Bill Bratton resigned in 1996, he recommended Timoney to replace him as NYPD chief. Instead Mayor Rudy Giuliani passed him over and selected Howard Safir as the next chief.

=== Philadelphia ===
In March 1998, Philadelphia mayor Ed Rendell appointed Timoney as Philadelphia Police commissioner. Timoney served through the end of 2001. His career marked a turnaround in Philadelphia's increasing homicide rate but had controversy. Critics challenged his handling of protests during the 2000 Republican National Convention, particularly his use of undercover agents to infiltrate protest groups.

After leaving the Philadelphia police, Timoney returned to consulting and worked for a security firm in New York. He also served as a security adviser for the 2002 World Economic Forum in New York.

=== Miami ===
Timoney did not stay in the private sector for long. He was a candidate for Los Angeles Police Department chief but was edged out by his former boss Bill Bratton. Instead, Timoney replaced Raul Martinez as the chief of the Miami Police Department.

Timoney took office on January 2, 2003, inheriting a department with a reputation for shooting civilians. During his first 20 months as Chief of Police, in contrast, not a single officer of the Miami police force fired a shot, winning Timoney a reputation as "one of the most progressive and effective police chiefs in the country."

Miami was particularly eager to put Timoney in place because of the upcoming Free Trade Area of the Americas summit. Timoney organized a group of 2,500 police officers from various local, state, and federal jurisdictions to manage the protests. His controversial tactics included extensive use of "pepper spray, rubber bullets, bean bag rounds, Tasers, electrified shields and batons" and observers recorded several instances of police firing "less-lethal" bullets at non-violent demonstrators.

At one point, Timoney was reported to have personally cursed a demonstrator, yelling, "Fuck you! You're bad!" A documentary on the protests, The Miami Model, interviewed several people stating that they were urged to commit crimes during the protests by police agents.

Although the ACLU protested these perceived abuses, ultimately filing seven lawsuits, its executive director praised Timoney as "probably one of the most professional, competent and experienced police chiefs the city of Miami ever had". In 2009, Timoney named Delrish Moss, a department spokesman and expert in community relations, to his executive staff. (Note: In 2016, following the controversial shooting of Michael Brown, and widespread accusations of racial proviling and discrimination, Moss, an African-American, was named Chief of the Ferguson Police Department.)

In August 2007, Timoney became embroiled in a controversy over his use of a Lexus SUV, which an area dealer allowed him to drive without cost, using a Florida dealer plate, for approximately one year. Immediately upon the swearing in of Mayor Tomas Regalado in November 2009, Timoney dispatched his resignation letter, effective January 2010.

=== Bahrain ===
In December 2011, Timoney was hired by the Ministry of the Interior of Bahrain. The appointment came during the pro-democracy Bahraini uprising, leading to speculation from The New York Times that he had been hired to teach his "Miami model" of protest dispersal, involving "heavy use of concussion grenades, pepper spray, tear gas, rubber bullets and baton charges." Timoney stated in an interview with NPR's Robert Siegel that protests in Bahrain were banned and forcibly dispersed because of traffic concerns created by narrow streets, which made safe protest, anywhere in the capital of Manama, impossible. This explanation was echoed the following day by the Ministry of the Interior's official Twitter feed.

The Guardian reported widespread criticism of Timoney's "reliance" on tear gas, noting three deaths that occurred among the protesters since he had joined the Ministry; its headline described Timoney as "notorious." However, the story also noted his supporters' argument that his "record for turning failing police departments around" made him ideal to control the perceived excesses of Bahraini security forces.

Timoney justified the use of tear gas by Bahraini police as a nonlethal method of crowd dispersal by saying that its use is justified in the face of a rise in violent attacks on policemen: "Police have been using tear gas to create distance between them and gangs of rioters that have been on a very steady basis, day after day, assaulting police officers with Molotov cocktails and also with bricks, nails and other things." He pointed out that he has "seen police using great restraint after tremendous provocation night after night." While admitting that tear gas had its problems, he claimed that it is "a more desirable weapon than, for example, using live rounds to defend yourself." He emphasized that tear gas is not lethal and says that the authorities "have thousands of police officers out there on a daily basis. They are smelling and touching that gas themselves. We've had nobody come in with poison or respiratory problems." A senior member of Bahrain's parliament praised Timoney for "changing a lot in the culture of the Ministry of Interior" and contributing to Bahrain's security reform.

Another Guardian journalist, Matthew Cassel, reported that he himself had been tear-gassed, shot with rubber bullets, and chased by police who sought to confiscate his equipment while covering the Miami protests; he argued that Timoney's hiring demonstrated that the ruling Al Khalifa family was "more concerned with maintaining absolute power as they continue to lose further legitimacy, rather than implementing any real reforms to move past the country's political crisis." The Bahrain Centre for Human Rights also expressed its "concern" about the hiring, noting "Timoney's past human rights violations."

== Personal ==
Timoney and his wife Noreen wed in 1971. She was once a director of finance and administration at ABC in New York, but when her husband's career blossomed, she became an independent business consultant to devote more time to managing home and family. She serves as president of the Miami Women's Club. They have two adult children, Christine and Seán.

Timoney was an avid runner and competed in at least 14 marathons. Timoney died in Miami on August 16, 2016, of lung cancer, aged 68.

== Bibliography ==
- Timoney, John F. (2010). Birch, Eugenie L.; Wachter, Susan M. (eds.). Beat Cop to Top Cop: A Tale of Three Cities. The City in the Twenty-First Century. Philadelphia, Pennsylvania: University of Pennsylvania Press. ISBN 978-0-8122-4246-1.
- Walsh, Elsa (March 5, 2007), "Miami Blue: The Testing of a Top Cop", The New Yorker, pp. 46–53
- Cullen, Jim (1995), "Chief John F. Timoney: The Path from Dromahair" (PDF), Leitrim Guardian: 35–36

== Notes ==
Police appointments
| Preceded by Raul Martinez | Chief of Miami Police Department; 2003–2010 | Succeeded by Miguel A. Exposito |
| Preceded by Richard Neal | Commissioner of Philadelphia Police Department; 1998–2002 | Succeeded by Sylvester Johnson |
