= James Knowles (footballer, born 1881) =

English footballer

Personal information
- Full name: James Henry Knowles
- Date of birth: 1881
- Place of birth: Bolton, England
- Date of death: 1923 (aged 41–42)
- Position: Inside forward

Senior career*
Years	Team	Apps	(Gls)
1902–1903	Bolton Wanderers	3	(3)
1903–1907	Heywood United		
1907	Turton		
Total		3	(3)
- * Club domestic league appearances and goals

James Henry Knowles (1881–1923) was an English footballer who played in the Football League for Bolton Wanderers.
