= Ferguson, Missouri =

City in St. Louis County, Missouri, United States

- City
- City of Ferguson
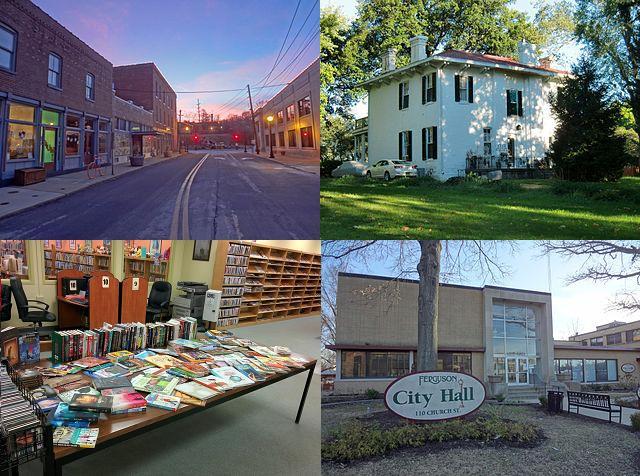
- Ferguson's Church Street in 2012, the Wildwood House in 2012, the Ferguson Municipal Library in 2014, and the Ferguson City Hall in 2012

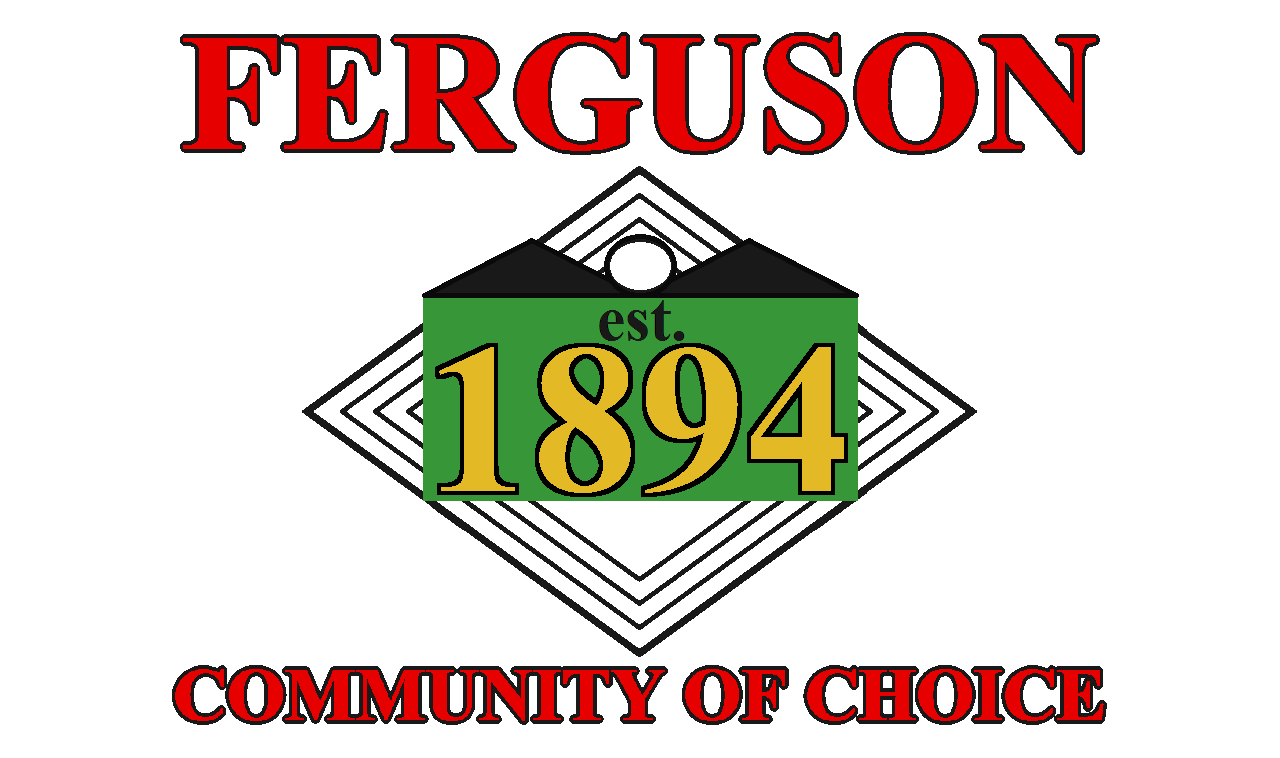
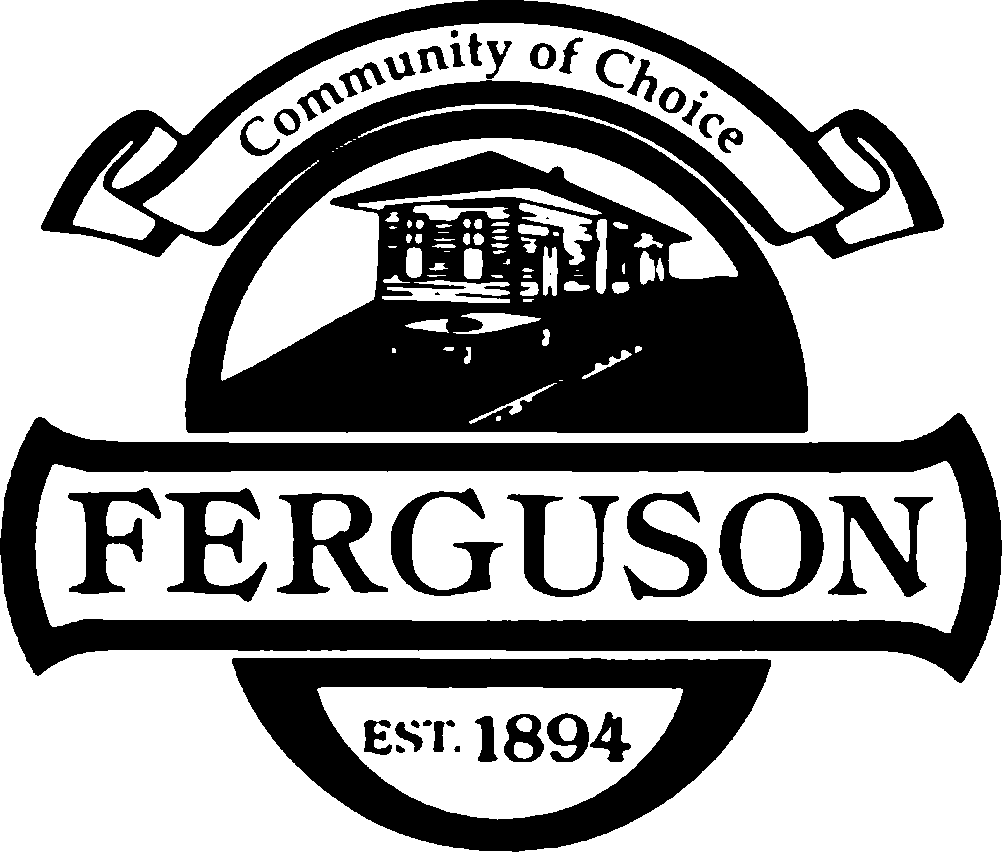
- Flag Seal
- Etymology: William B. Ferguson
- Nickname: "Community of Choice"
- Motto: "Proud Past. Promising Future!"
- Location within St. Louis County (left) and Missouri (right)
- Coordinates: 38°44′40″N 90°18′18″W
- Country: United States
- State: Missouri
- County: St. Louis
- Townships: Ferguson, Norwood
- Incorporated: 1894

Government
  - Mayor: Ella Jones (D)

Area
  - Total: 6.18 sq mi (16.00 km^{2})
  - Land: 6.17 sq mi (15.98 km^{2})
  - Water: 0.0077 sq mi (0.02 km^{2})
- Elevation: 554 ft (169 m)

Population (2020)
  - Total: 18,527
  - Density: 3,003.2/sq mi (1,159.55/km^{2})
- Demonym: Fergusonian
- Time zone: UTC-6 (Central (CST))
  - Summer (DST): UTC-5 (CDT)
- ZIP Code: 63135
- Area code: 314
- FIPS code: 29-23986
- GNIS feature ID: 2394760
- Website: City of Ferguson

Ferguson is a city in St. Louis County, Missouri, United States. It is part of the Greater St. Louis metropolitan area. Per the 2020 census, the population was 18,527, and is predominantly Black.

== History ==
What is now the city of Ferguson was founded in 1855, when William B. Ferguson deeded 10 acres (4.0 ha) of land to the Wabash Railroad in exchange for a new depot and naming rights. The settlement that sprang up around the depot was called Ferguson Station. Ferguson was the first railroad station connected directly to St. Louis. The station is a focal point of the city's history and is depicted on the city flag, designed in 1994.

Ferguson's first schoolhouse was built in 1878. Ferguson was incorporated as a city in 1894.

Emerson Electric moved its headquarters to Ferguson during the 20th century.

Ferguson made frequent worldwide headlines for months following the 2014 killing of Michael Brown Jr. by a police officer and the ensuing civil unrest. The United States Department of Justice investigation which followed resulted in large legal fees for the town, in excess of $300,000 a year. The investigation determined that the shooting was justified.

Ferguson elected its first Black and first female mayor, Ella Jones, on June 2, 2020.

== Demographics ==
The population of Ferguson grew rapidly during the late nineteenth century. In 1880 the population of the then Ferguson Station was 185 people. By 1890 the population was recorded as being 750 and only four years later it had increased to 1200.

The population of Ferguson continued to grow rapidly during the first six decades of the twentieth century, from 1,015 people in 1900 to 22,149 people in 1960, an average growth rate of 5% per year.

The ethnic composition of Ferguson has shifted, however. In 1970, 99% of the population of Ferguson was white and 1% Black. In 1980, the proportion of white residents went down to 85%, whereas the proportion of Black residents rose to 14%. In 1990, residents of Ferguson who were identified in the U.S. Census as white comprised 73.8% of the total, while those identified as Black made up 25.1%. The remainder, 1.1%, identified with other racial categories. In the 2000 U.S. Census, the city shifted to majority African American at 52.4% of the population (52.30% non-Hispanic African American).

=== Racial and ethnic composition ===
Ferguson city, Missouri – Racial and ethnic composition Note: the US Census treats Hispanic/Latino as an ethnic category. This table excludes Latinos from the racial categories and assigns them to a separate category. Hispanics/Latinos may be of any race.
Race / Ethnicity (NH = Non-Hispanic)	Pop 2000	Pop 2010	Pop 2020	% 2000	% 2010	% 2020
White alone (NH)	9,903	6,093	3,926	44.20%	28.74%	21.19%
Black or African American alone (NH)	11,718	14,252	13,302	52.30%	67.22%	71.80%
Native American or Alaska Native alone (NH)	23	78	29	0.10%	0.37%	0.16%
Asian alone (NH)	150	102	96	0.67%	0.48%	0.52%
Native Hawaiian or Pacific Islander alone (NH)	4	4	8	0.02%	0.02%	0.04%
Other race alone (NH)	29	25	114	0.13%	0.12%	0.62%
Mixed race or Multiracial (NH)	351	389	685	1.57%	1.83%	3.70%
Hispanic or Latino (any race)	228	260	367	1.02%	1.23%	1.98%
Total	22,406	21,203	18,527	100.00%	100.00%	100.00%

=== 2020 census ===
Historical population
Census	Pop.	Note	%±
1880	185		—
1890	750		305.4%
1900	1,015		35.3%
1910	1,658		63.3%
1920	1,874		13.0%
1930	3,798		102.7%
1940	5,724		50.7%
1950	11,573		102.2%
1960	22,149		91.4%
1970	28,759		29.8%
1980	24,740		−14.0%
1990	22,286		−9.9%
2000	22,406		0.5%
2010	21,203		−5.4%
2020	18,527		−12.6%
U.S. Decennial Census; 2010 2020

As of the 2020 census, Ferguson had a population of 18,527. The median age was 36.5 years. 25.5% of residents were under the age of 18 and 14.4% of residents were 65 years of age or older. For every 100 females there were 80.8 males, and for every 100 females age 18 and over there were 75.1 males age 18 and over.

There were 7,460 households in Ferguson, including 5,272 families. Of all households, 33.0% had children under the age of 18 living in them, 26.0% were married-couple households, 19.9% were households with a male householder and no spouse or partner present, and 46.6% were households with a female householder and no spouse or partner present. About 31.1% of all households were made up of individuals and 10.7% had someone living alone who was 65 years of age or older.

There were 8,887 housing units, of which 16.1% were vacant. The homeowner vacancy rate was 3.1% and the rental vacancy rate was 16.9%.

100.0% of residents lived in urban areas, while 0.0% lived in rural areas.

Racial composition as of the 2020 census
Race	Number	Percent
White	3,965	21.4%
Black or African American	13,367	72.1%
American Indian and Alaska Native	45	0.2%
Asian	99	0.5%
Native Hawaiian and Other Pacific Islander	9	0.0%
Some other race	243	1.3%
Two or more races	799	4.3%

=== American Community Survey ===
The 2016–2020 5-year American Community Survey estimates show that the median household income was $37,376 (with a margin of error of +/- $5,435) and the median family income was $44,123 (+/- $8,219). Males had a median income of $29,652 (+/- $2,440) versus $27,351 (+/- $3,102) for females. The median income for those above 16 years old was $28,414 (+/- $2,545). Approximately, 21.4% of families and 23.6% of the population were below the poverty line, including 41.2% of those under the age of 18 and 8.1% of those ages 65 or over.

=== 2010 census ===
As of the 2010 U.S. census, there were 21,203 people, 8,192 households, and 5,500 families residing in the city. The population density was 3,425.4 inhabitants per square mile (1,322.6/km^{2}). There were 9,105 housing units at an average density of 1,470.9 per square mile (567.9/km^{2}). The racial makeup of the city was 67.4% Black, 29.3% white, 0.5% Asian, 0.4% Native American, 0.4% from other races, and 2.0% from two or more races. Hispanic and Latino of any race were 1.2% of the population.

There were 8,192 households, of which 39.1% had children under the age of 18 living with them, 29.6% were married couples living together, 31.5% had a female householder with no husband present, 6.1% had a male householder with no wife present, and 32.9% were non-families. 28.2% of all households were made up of individuals, and 7.4% had someone living alone who was 65 years of age or older. The average household size was 2.56 and the average family size was 3.12.

The median age in the city was 33.1 years. 28.7% of residents were under the age of 18; 10.4% were between the ages of 18 and 24; 25.2% were from 25 to 44; 25.3% were from 45 to 64; and 10.3% were 65 years of age or older. The gender makeup of the city was 44.8% male and 55.2% female.

== Geography ==
According to the United States Census Bureau, the city has a total area of 6.20 square miles (16.06 km^{2}), of which 6.19 square miles (16.03 km^{2}) is land and 0.01 square miles (0.03 km^{2}) is water.

=== Climate ===
Ferguson has a borderline humid subtropical-continental climate. Winters are cold, while summers are hot and humid. The record high is 115 °F, and the record low is −19 °F.

Climate data for Ferguson, MO
Month	Jan	Feb	Mar	Apr	May	Jun	Jul	Aug	Sep	Oct	Nov	Dec	Year
Record high °F (°C)	77 (25)	85 (29)	92 (33)	93 (34)	98 (37)	105 (41)	115 (46)	110 (43)	104 (40)	94 (34)	86 (30)	79 (26)	115 (46)
Mean daily maximum °F (°C)	38 (3)	44 (7)	55 (13)	67 (19)	76 (24)	85 (29)	90 (32)	88 (31)	80 (27)	68 (20)	54 (12)	42 (6)	66 (19)
Mean daily minimum °F (°C)	21 (−6)	27 (−3)	36 (2)	47 (8)	57 (14)	66 (19)	71 (22)	69 (21)	60 (16)	48 (9)	37 (3)	26 (−3)	47 (8)
Record low °F (°C)	−19 (−28)	−18 (−28)	−5 (−21)	20 (−7)	31 (−1)	43 (6)	51 (11)	47 (8)	32 (0)	21 (−6)	1 (−17)	−16 (−27)	−19 (−28)
Average precipitation inches (mm)	2.14 (54)	2.28 (58)	3.60 (91)	3.69 (94)	4.11 (104)	3.76 (96)	3.00 (76)	2.98 (76)	2.96 (75)	2.76 (70)	3.71 (94)	2.86 (73)	37.85 (961)
Average snowfall inches (cm)	7.4 (19)	4.8 (12)	3.3 (8.4)	0.6 (1.5)	0 (0)	0 (0)	0 (0)	0 (0)	0 (0)	0 (0)	1.5 (3.8)	4.9 (12)	22.9 (58)

== Economy ==
The City of Ferguson was home to the headquarters of Fortune 500 Company Emerson Electric up until early February 2025, when the Company unveiled "Emerson Tower" as the new Global Headquarters in Clayton, MO.

== Government ==
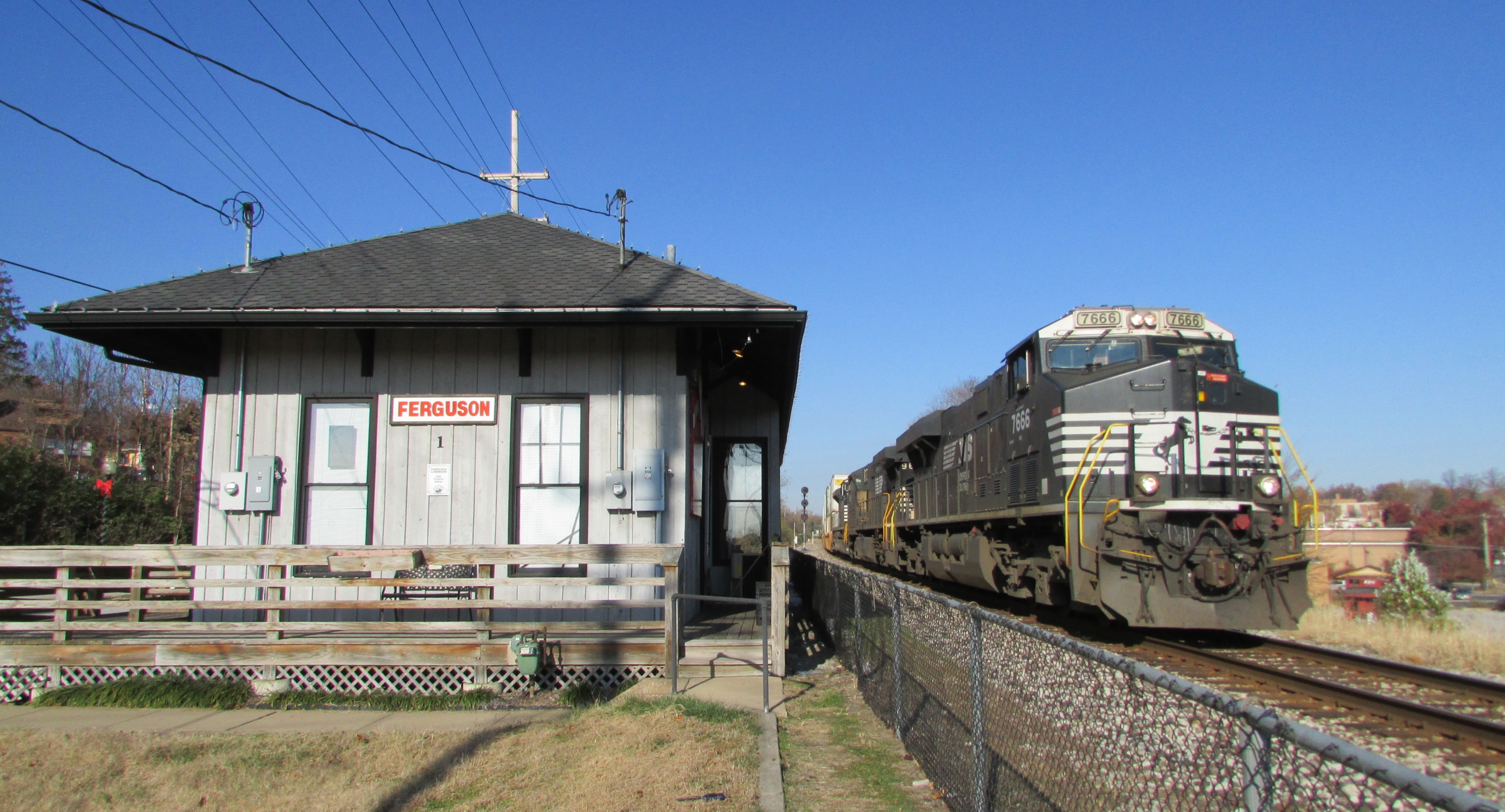
A train rolls past the former Wabash station (now an ice cream parlor) in Ferguson.

The Mayor of Ferguson is directly elected for a three-year term. The Ferguson city council is composed of six members.

James Knowles III was elected mayor for a three-year term in April 2011 and ran unopposed in April 2014. Voter turnout in the April 2014 mayoral election was approximately 12%. In June 2020, Ella Jones (D) became the first African American and first woman to be elected mayor of Ferguson.

The Ferguson Police Department is involved with the following public programs: Business Watch, Community Emergency Response Team (CERT), D.A.R.E. Program, Neighborhood Watch, School Resource Officers, and Riot Patrol.

Ferguson also operates a two-station fire department with a complement of 18 full-time firefighters as well as nine senior management officials. The fire stations operate 24 hours a day.

=== Ferguson Police Department ===
On March 4, 2015, the Ferguson Police Department was criticized by the United States Department of Justice for civil rights violations. The Department of Justice argued that the Ferguson Police Department and the City of Ferguson relied on unconstitutional practices in order to balance the city's budget through racially motivated excessive fines and punishments.

On March 11, 2015, Ferguson police chief Thomas Jackson stated he was willing to resign, likely later that day (though no timeframe was confirmed) if he could get assurances that the Ferguson Police Department would be left in place and would not be dissolved; Fox News said he was not pushed out or fired. His resignation followed City Manager John Shaw who resigned March 10, and Municipal Judge Ronald Brockmeyer, who resigned March 9. Shaw had ultimate oversight over the Police Department and other city departments and was the most powerful civic official in Ferguson. He faced criticism for not doing enough to ameliorate the situation. The week before, three Ferguson Police Department employees were fired for offensive emails mentioned in the Justice Department report.

=== Ferguson Fire Department ===
The Ferguson Fire Department is a Career fire department and provides 24/7 fire and emergency medical services to the City of Ferguson. The department hosts one frontline Rescue Pumpers and one Turntable Ladder across two stations, one in the Northeast of the City (Station No. 2) and one in the City Center (Station No. 1) neighboring the police department and Municipal Courts building. The current Station No. 1 was built in 2015, prior the department's Station No. 1 was housed out of an extension of the City Hall on Church Street. During this time the department's ladder was too large to fit into the station bay and was usually kept outside in the rear parking lot; this extension is now home to FYI Backbay, a Youth Organization.

The department also served the City of Kinloch when the Kinloch Fire Protection District's sole pumper was unavailable up until 2021 when the district added a second pumper into their fleet.

== Michael Brown shooting ==
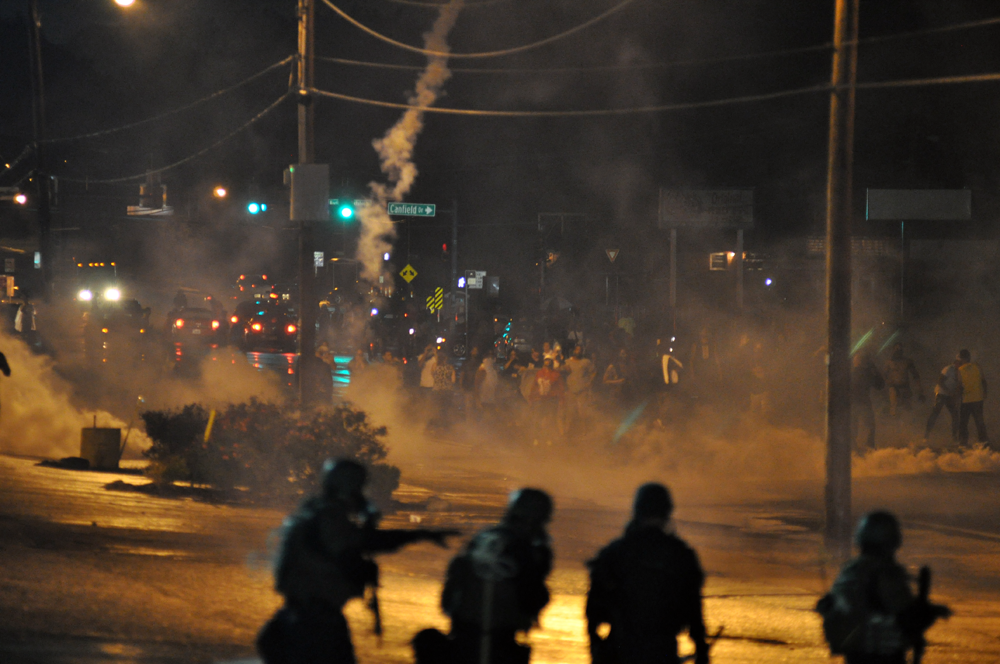
Police officers using tear gas on rioters during the Ferguson unrest

On August 9, 2014, an 18-year-old, Michael Brown, was fatally shot by Darren Wilson with the Ferguson Police Department after an encounter with the officer that led to an altercation and subsequent pursuit. The incident sparked riots and acts of vandalism in Ferguson as well as widespread calls for an investigation into the incident. On August 10, after a day of vigils, there were looting of businesses, arson, vandalism of vehicles, shots fired at firefighters and violent clashes between rioters and police. On August 18, guardsmen from the Missouri National Guard arrived in Ferguson at the request of the Governor of Missouri Jay Nixon, who also ended midnight to 5:00 a.m. curfews that had been imposed. On November 24, a grand jury decided that it would not indict Wilson in the shooting death of Brown. Following the announcement of the grand jury's decision, there was more rioting.

== Education ==
St. Louis Community College-Florissant Valley, which has about 8,000 students, is located in Ferguson.

Much of the community is within the Ferguson-Florissant School District (FFSD). Primary schools (grades K-2) serving sections of Ferguson include Central, Bermuda, Holman, and Walnut Grove. Intermediate schools (grade 3-5) serving sections of Ferguson include Lee-Hamilton, Griffith, and Berkeley. Zoned secondary schools with attendance boundaries that coincide with Ferguson include Johnson-Wabash 6th Grade Center, Ferguson Middle School, and McCluer High School. A portion of Ferguson is instead in the Riverview Gardens School District, and another is in the Hazelwood School District.

The following FFSD public schools are located within the city of Ferguson:

- STEAM Academy at McCluer South-Berkeley (a magnet school for grades 9-12), formerly McCluer South-Berkeley High School
- Ferguson Middle School (7-8)
- Johnson-Wabash 6th Grade Center (formerly Elementary School)
- Griffith Elementary School (3-5)
- Lee-Hamilton Elementary School (3-5)
- Central Elementary School (K-2)

Vogt Elementary School closed in 2019.

The following private schools are located within the city of Ferguson:

- Blessed Teresa of Calcutta School (Roman Catholic Archdiocese of St. Louis)
- Our Lady of Guadalupe School (Roman Catholic Archdiocese of St. Louis)
- Zion Lutheran School

Ferguson is also home to the Challenger Learning Center – St. Louis, which provides a space education program.

The Ferguson Municipal Public Library is one of several independent community libraries in St. Louis County and is a member of the Municipal Library Consortium of St. Louis County.

== Notable people ==
This list may include persons born in the community, past residents, and current residents.

- General Ralph Eberhart, USAF, Commander of the North American Aerospace Defense Command during the September 11 attacks
- Michael McDonald, Grammy Award-winning singer
- Henry Miller, also known as Sentoryu, mixed martial artist and former sumo wrestler
- Delrish Moss, Miami law enforcement veteran sworn in on May 9, 2016, as the first permanent African-American Police Chief of Ferguson
- Susan Notorangelo, long-distance cyclist
- Enos Slaughter, Hall of Fame-winning St. Louis Cardinals baseball player
- Maury Travis, serial killer
- Harry Tuthill, cartoonist of the syndicated comic strip, The Bungle Family
- Tyron Woodley, American mixed martial artist, former UFC welterweight champion

== See also ==
- List of cities in Missouri
