= Law enforcement agency =

Government agency responsible for the enforcement of the laws

A law enforcement agency (LEA) is any government agency responsible for law enforcement within a specific jurisdiction through the employment and deployment of law enforcement officers and their resources. The most common type of law enforcement agency is the police, but various other forms exist as well, including agencies that focus on specific legal violations or are organized and overseen by certain authorities. They typically have various powers and legal rights to allow them to perform their duties, such as the power of arrest and the use of force.

== Jurisdiction ==
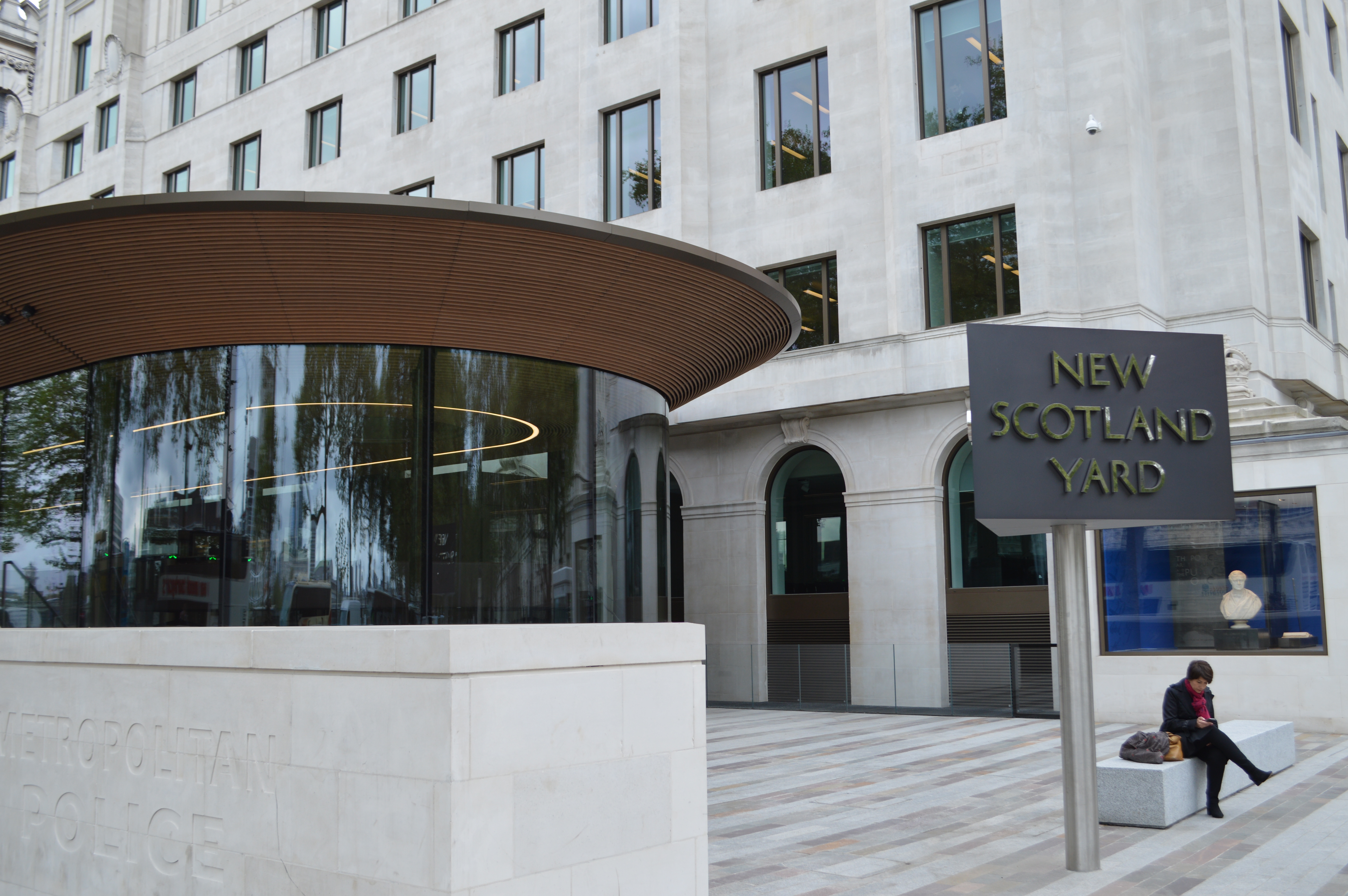
Scotland Yard, headquarters of the Metropolitan Police, the law enforcement agency of London, England

LEAs that have their power restricted in some way are said to operate within a jurisdiction. Jurisdictions are traditionally restricted to a geographic area and territory. An LEA might be able to apply its powers within a state (e.g., the National Police for the entirety of France), within an administrative division (e.g., the Ontario Provincial Police for Ontario, Canada), within a division of an administrative division (e.g., the Miami-Dade Police Department for Miami-Dade County, Florida, United States), or across a collection of states typically within an international organization or political union (e.g., Europol for the European Union).

Sometimes, the jurisdiction of an LEA is determined by the type of violation committed, the specific laws the agency enforces, the affected parties, or the severity of the offense. For example, in the United States, the Postal Inspection Service primarily investigates crimes affecting or misusing the services of the United States Postal Service, such as mail and wire fraud. If a Postal Inspection Service investigation uncovered tobacco smuggling, the Bureau of Alcohol, Tobacco, Firearms and Explosives would be involved, but the Drug Enforcement Administration would not, as even though they investigate drug smuggling, their jurisdiction does not cover specifically tobacco smuggling. In other cases, an LEA's involvement is determined by whether their involvement is requested. The Australian Federal Police, for instance, has jurisdiction over all of Australia but usually takes on complex, serious matters referred to it by another agency; that other agency will undertake its own investigations of less serious or complex matters by consensus.

LEA jurisdictions for a country and its divisions can be at more than one level. An LEA restricted to a jurisdiction is typically referred to as local police or territorial police. The United States has five basic tiers of law enforcement jurisdiction: federal, state, county, municipality, and special jurisdiction (tribal, airport, transit, railroad, etc.). Only the municipal, county, and state levels are involved in direct policing (i.e., uniformed officers with marked cars and regular patrols). In some countries, national or federal police also participate in direct policing, although their focus and responsibilities may vary. In Brazil, there are five federal police forces with national jurisdiction—the Federal Police of Brazil, the Federal Highway Police, the Federal Railroad Police, the Federal Penal Police, and the National Public Security Force. The Highway Police, Railroad Police, and Penal Police are restricted to specific area jurisdictions (the Brazilian Highway System, railways, and prisons respectively), the Federal Police performs various police duties across the country and investigates crimes, and the National Public Security Force is a rapid reaction force deployed to assist state authorities on request.

Some levels of jurisdictions may overlap, resulting in the differentiation of duties. As an example for the US tiers, the Chicago Police Department has jurisdiction over Chicago but not necessarily the rest of Cook County. While the Cook County Sheriff's Office has jurisdiction over Cook County, for the most part they patrol unincorporated areas and operate Cook County Jail, leaving municipalities to municipal police departments. The rest of Illinois, primarily its state highways, is under the jurisdiction of the Illinois State Police. Although they typically avoid each other's responsible areas, overlapping jurisdictions can assist each other if necessary, usually in the form of higher-tier agencies assisting lower-tier agencies.

=== Operational areas ===
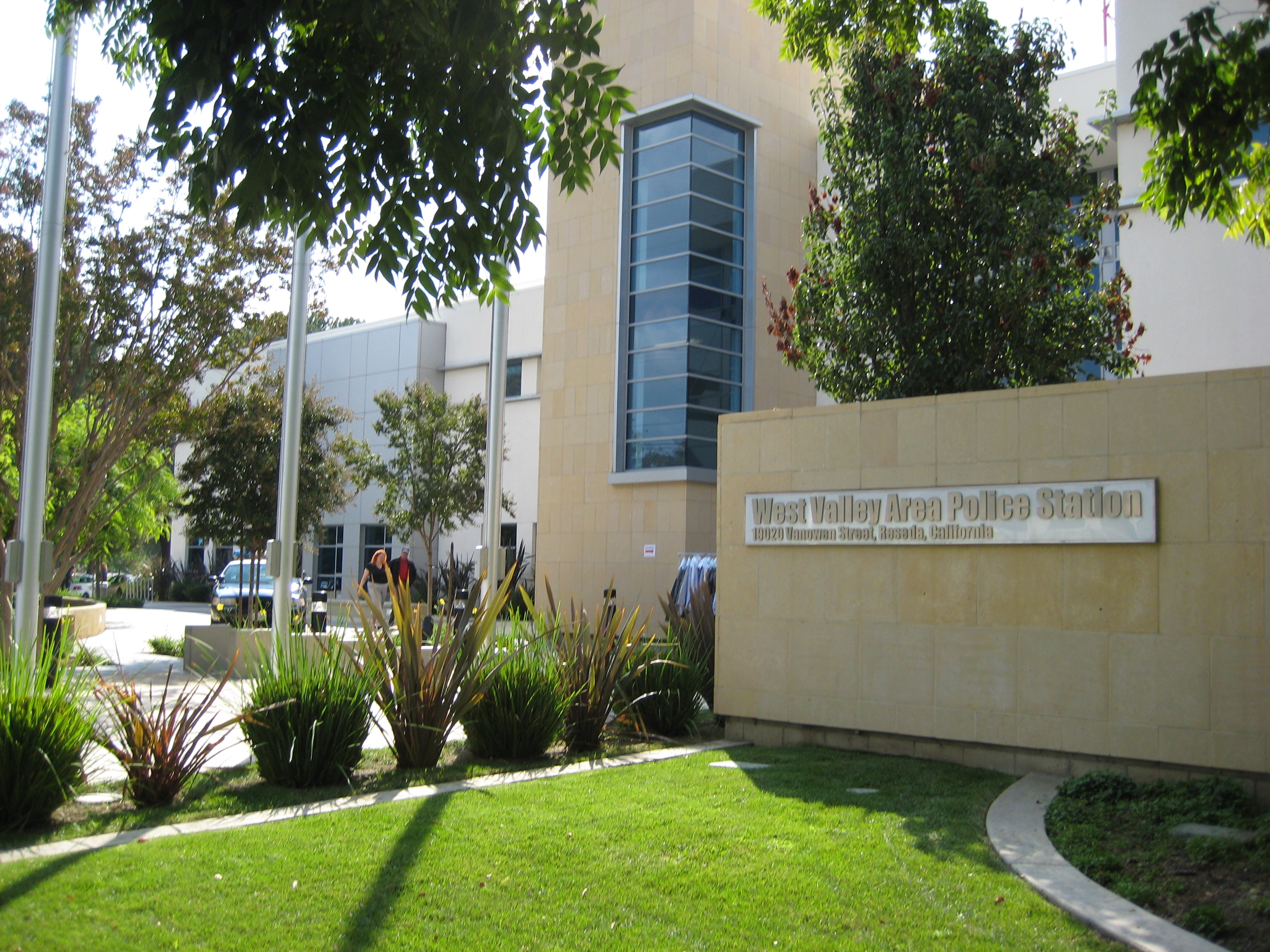
The exterior of the Los Angeles Police Department's West Valley Area Police Station. The LAPD operates approximately 21 such stations divided across Los Angeles; this one covers policing in the San Fernando Valley.

Often, an LEA's jurisdiction will be geographically divided into operational areas for administrative and logistical efficiency reasons. An operational area is often called a command, division, or office. Colloquially, they are known as beats.

While the operational area of a LEA is sometimes referred to as its jurisdiction, the agency typically retains legal authority across all geographic areas in which it operates. However, by policy and mutual agreement, its operations are generally confined to its designated area and do not extend into other operational zones of the agency. For example, since 2019 the frontline or territorial policing of the United Kingdom's Metropolitan Police has been divided into 12 Basic Command Units, each consisting of two, three, or four of the London boroughs, while the New York City Police Department is divided into 77 precincts.

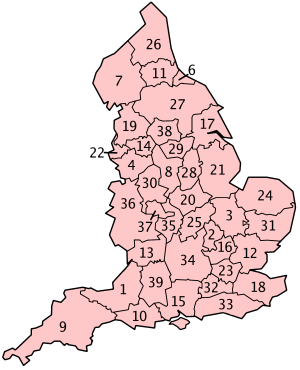
English law enforcement agency territorial divisions

Sometimes, one legal jurisdiction is covered by more than one LEA, which may arise due to administrative and logistical efficiency reasons, policy, or historical reasons. In England and Wales, LEAs called constabularies have jurisdiction over their respective areas of legal coverage, but they do not normally operate out of their areas without formal liaison between them. The primary difference between separate agencies and operational areas within the one legal jurisdiction is the degree of flexibility to move resources between versus within agencies. When multiple LEAs cover the one legal jurisdiction, each agency still typically organizes itself into operations areas. In the United States, within a state's legal jurisdiction, county and city LEAs do not have full legal jurisdictional flexibility throughout the state, and this has led in part to mergers of adjacent police agencies.

=== International and multinational law enforcement agencies ===
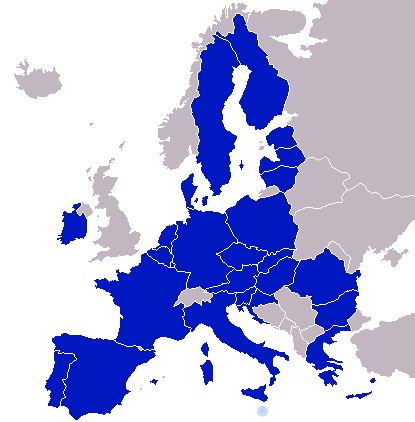
Non executive powers jurisdictional coverage of Europol

Although international LEAs and multinational LEAs are both often termed "international" in official documents, differences exist between the two. An international law enforcement agency has jurisdiction and/or operates in multiple countries and across state borders, such as Interpol and United Nations Police. A multinational law enforcement agency typically operates in only one country, or one division of a country, but is made up of personnel from several countries, such as the European Union Police Mission in Bosnia and Herzegovina. International LEAs are typically also multinational, but multinational LEAs are typically not international. Rather than enforcing laws directly, LEAs that operate across a collection of countries tend to facilitate the sharing of information necessary for law enforcement between those countries.

=== Federal and national law enforcement agencies ===
When an LEA's jurisdiction is for the whole country, it is usually one of two broad types: federal or national.

==== Federal ====
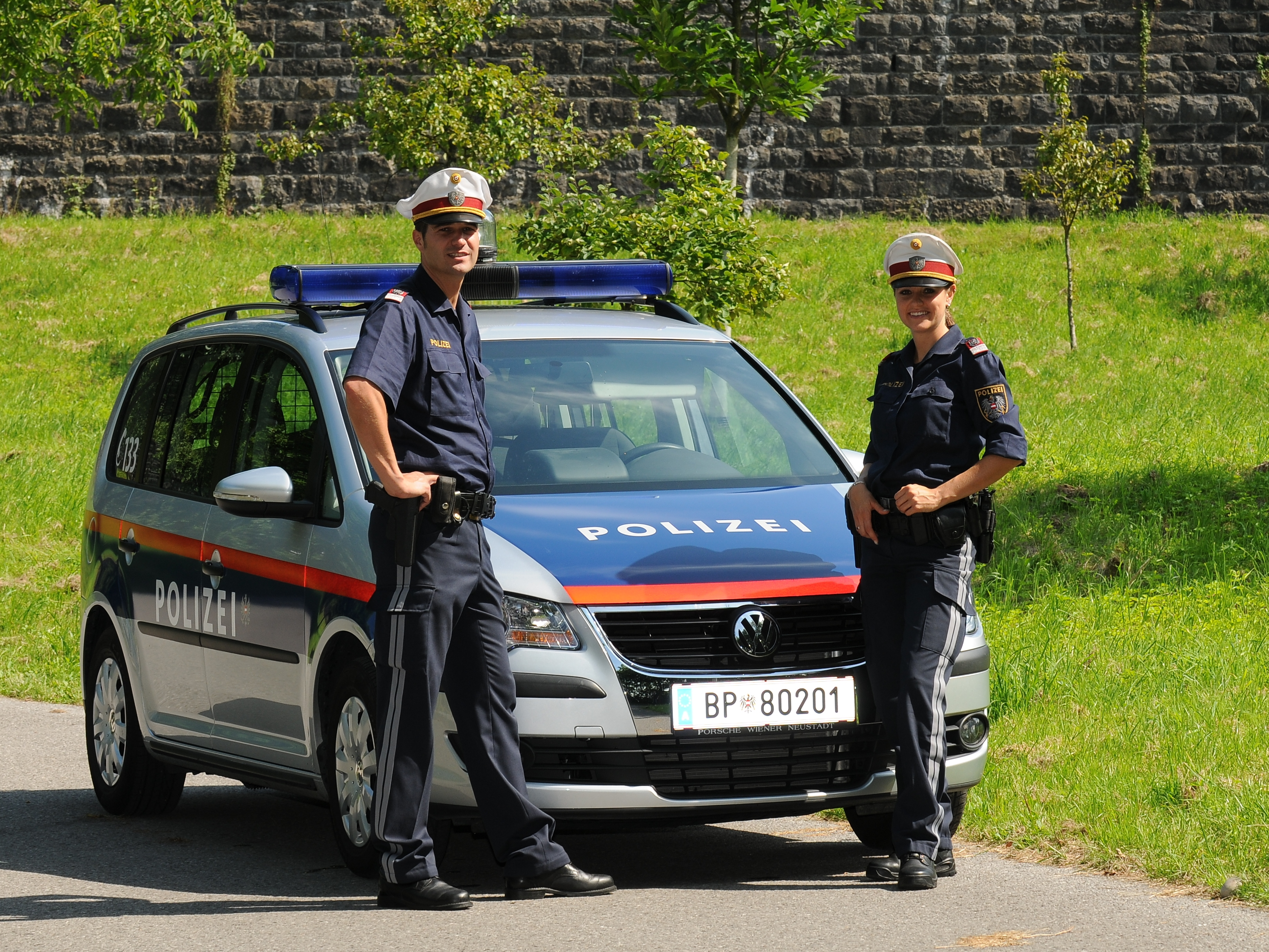
Bundespolizei officers with their police car

When a country has a federal constitution, the LEA responsible for the entire country is referred to as a federal law enforcement agency. The responsibilities of a federal LEA vary from country to country. Federal LEA responsibilities typically include the countering of fraud against the federation, immigration and border control regarding people and goods, the investigation of currency counterfeiting, the policing of airports and protection of designated national infrastructure, national security, and the protection of the country's head of state and other designated very important persons.

A federal police agency is a federal LEA that also has the typical police responsibilities of social order and public safety, as well as federal law enforcement responsibilities. However, a federal police agency will not usually exercise its powers at a divisional level. Such exercising of powers typically involves specific arrangements between the federal and divisional governing bodies.

Examples of federal law enforcement agencies include the following:

- Argentine Federal Police (Argentina)
- Australian Federal Police (Australia)
- Federal Police of Brazil (Brazil)
- Royal Canadian Mounted Police (Canada)
- Bundespolizei (Germany)
- Mexican Federal Police (Mexico)
- Federal Bureau of Investigation, United States Marshals Service (United States)
- Federal Investigation Agency, National Cyber Crimes Investigation Agency (Pakistan)
- Central Bureau of Investigation (India)

A federated approach to a country's organization does not necessarily indicate how law enforcement agencies are organized within the country. Some countries, such as Austria and Belgium, have a relatively unified approach to law enforcement but still have operationally separate units for federal law enforcement and divisional policing. The United States has a highly fractured approach to law enforcement agencies generally, and this is reflected in American federal law enforcement agencies.

===== Relationship between federal and federated divisions =====
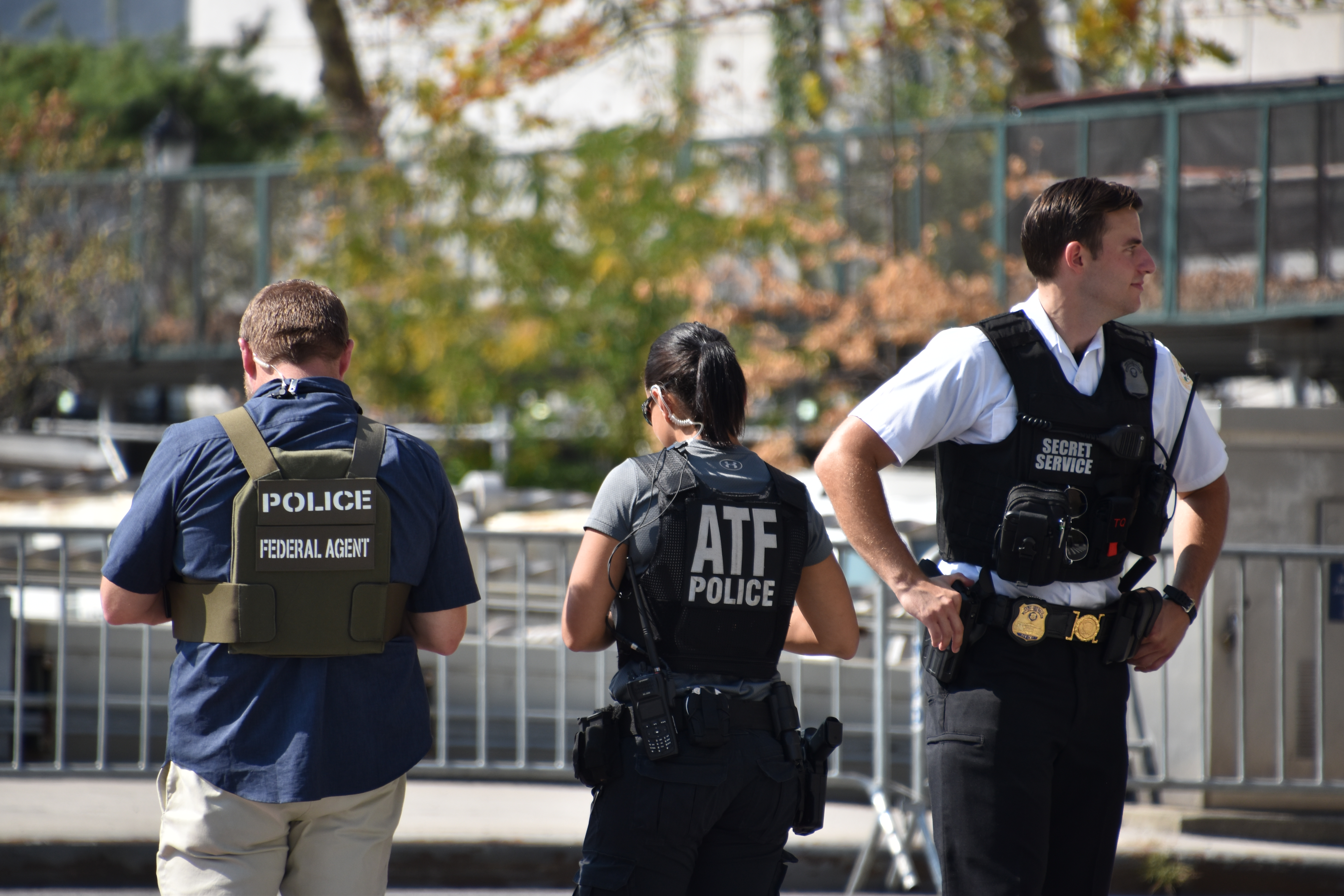
American federal law enforcement agents working together. Each federal LEA in the U.S. has a different focus and jurisdiction; for example, the Bureau of Alcohol, Tobacco, Firearms and Explosives (agent in center) investigates crimes involving alcohol, tobacco, and weaponry.

In a federation, there will typically be separate LEAs with jurisdictions for each division within the federation. A federal LEA will have primary responsibility for laws that affect the federation as a whole and that have been enacted by the governing body of the federation.

Typically, federal LEAs have relatively narrow police responsibilities; the individual divisions within the federation usually establish their own police agencies to enforce laws within the division. However, in some countries federal agencies have jurisdiction in divisions of the federation. This typically happens when the division does not have its own independent status and is dependent on the federation. The Royal Canadian Mounted Police (RCMP) is one such federal agency that also acts as the sole police agency for Canada's three territories: the Northwest Territories, Nunavut, and Yukon.

Federal LEA members may also be given jurisdiction within a federation's division for laws enacted by the division's governing bodies either by the relevant division or by the federation's governing body. For example, the Australian Federal Police is a federal agency and has the legal power to enforce the laws enacted by any Australian state, but it will generally only enforce state law if there is a federal aspect to investigate.

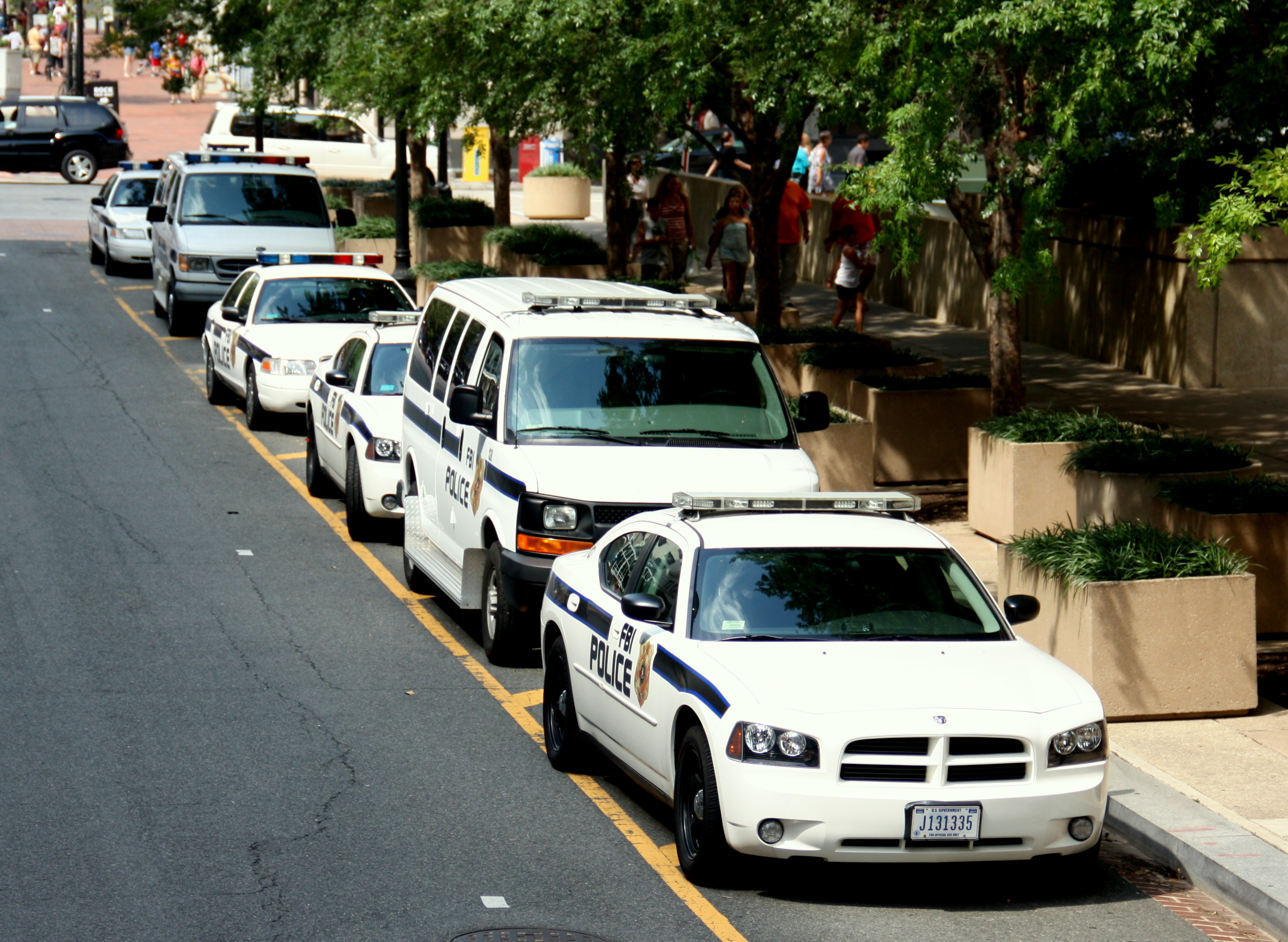
FBI Police cars outside a Federal Bureau of Investigation facility. The FBI Police is responsible for protecting, and has jurisdiction over, facilities owned and operated by the FBI.

In federal polities, actions that violate laws in multiple geographical divisions within the federation or are deemed to be serious are escalated to a federal LEA. In other cases, specific crimes deemed to be serious are escalated; for example, in the United States, the FBI investigates all kidnapping cases regardless of whether they involve the crossing of state lines. Some countries provide law enforcement on land and in buildings owned or controlled by the federation by using a federal LEA; for example, the U.S. Department of Homeland Security is responsible for some aspects of federal property law enforcement.

==== National ====
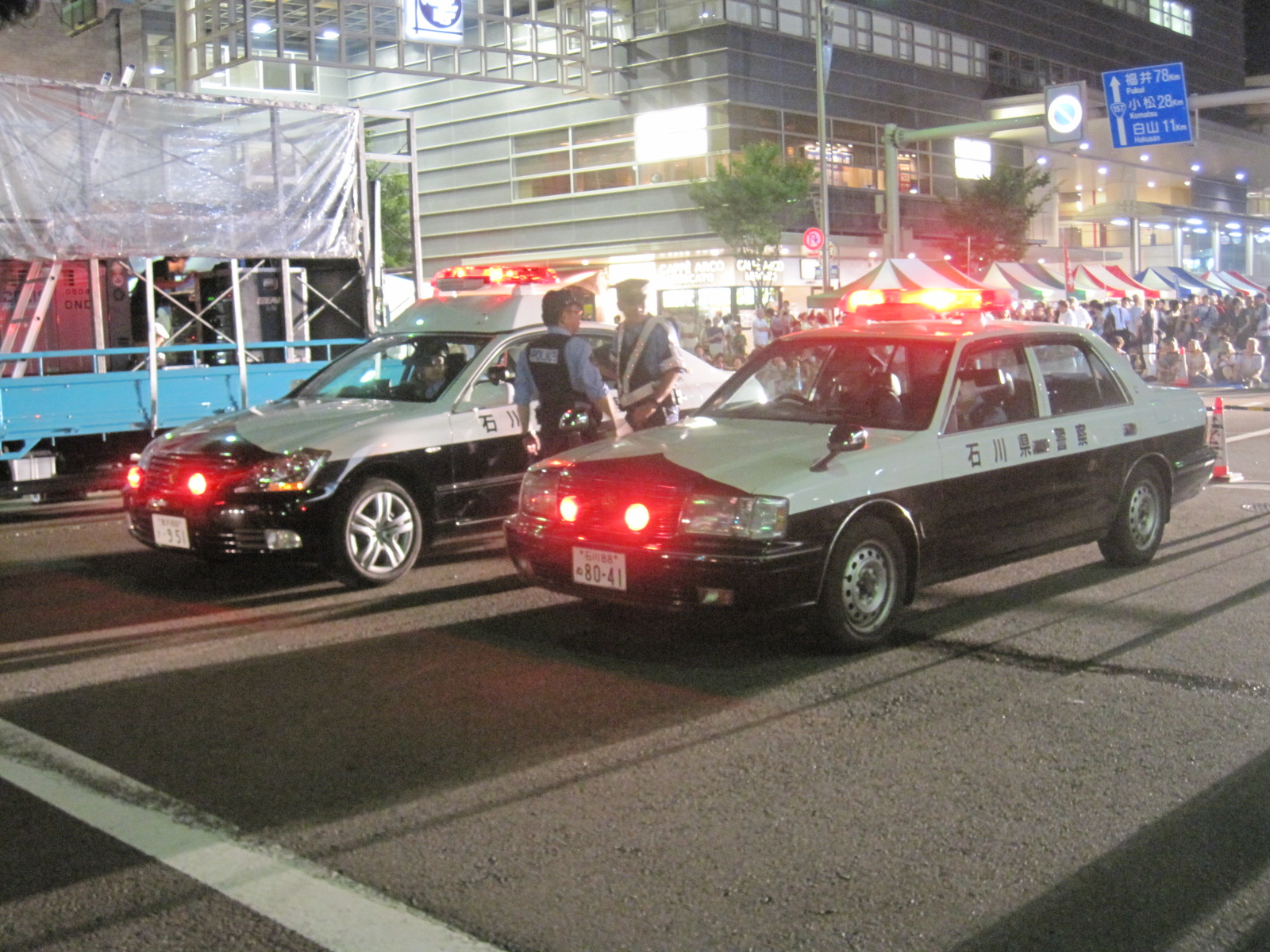
Ishikawa Prefectural Police officers with their police cars. Japanese police are managed and coordinated by the National Police Agency, and divided into agencies for their respective prefectures.

A national law enforcement agency is an LEA in a country that does not have divisions capable of making their own laws. A national LEA has the combined responsibilities that federal LEAs and divisional LEAs would have in a federated country. National LEAs are usually divided into operational areas.

To help avoid confusion over jurisdictional responsibility, some federal LEAs, such as the US Federal Bureau of Investigation (FBI), explicitly state that they are not a national law enforcement agency.

A national police agency is a national LEA that also has the typical police responsibilities of social order and public safety as well as national law enforcement responsibilities. Examples of countries with non-federal national police agencies are New Zealand, Italy, Albania, Indonesia, France, Ireland, Japan, Netherlands, Malaysia, the Philippines, and Nicaragua.

=== State law enforcement agencies ===
State police, provincial police, or regional police are a type of subnational territorial police force found in nations organized as federations, typically in North America, South Asia, and Oceania, because each of their state police is mostly at the country level. These forces typically have jurisdiction over the relevant sub-national jurisdiction and may cooperate in law enforcement activities with municipal or national police where either exist.

== Types ==
LEAs can be responsible for the enforcement of laws affecting the behavior of people or the general community (e.g., New York City Police Department), the behavior of commercial organizations and corporations (e.g., Australian Securities and Investments Commission), or for the interests of the country as a whole (e.g., United Kingdom's His Majesty's Revenue and Customs). In most countries, the formal term law enforcement agency includes agencies other than police agencies. The term law enforcement agency is often used in the United States to refer to police agencies; however, it also includes agencies with peace officer status or agencies which prosecute criminal acts. A county prosecutor or district attorney is considered to be the chief law enforcement officer of a county.

=== Police ===
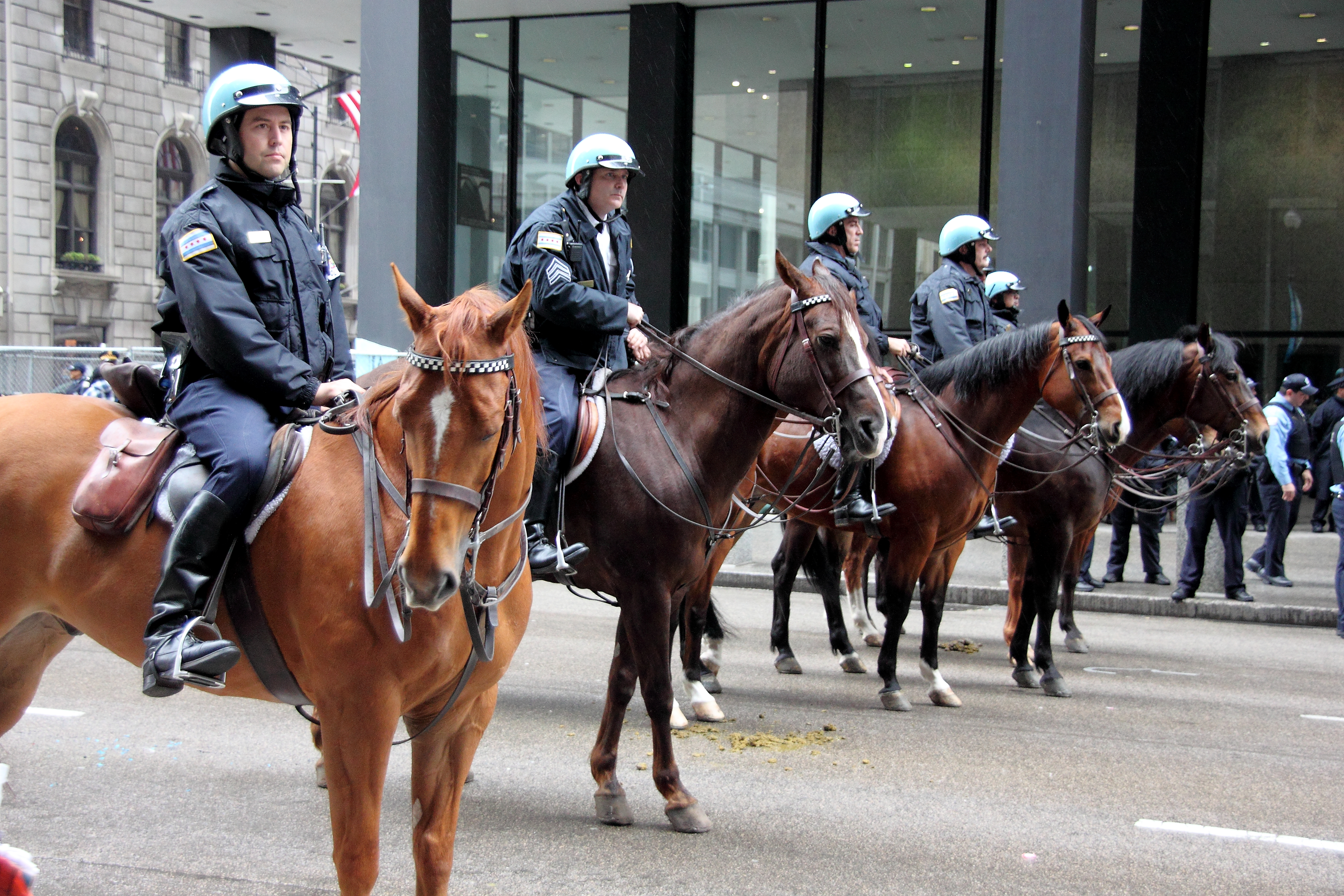
Chicago Police Department officers on horseback

Many law enforcement agencies are police agencies that have a broad range of powers and responsibilities, some of which relate to social order and public safety rather than law enforcement. The understanding that police agencies encompass more than just law is recognized formally by scholars and academics as well as by general society. A police agency's jurisdiction for social order and public safety will normally be the same as its jurisdiction for law enforcement.

=== Military ===
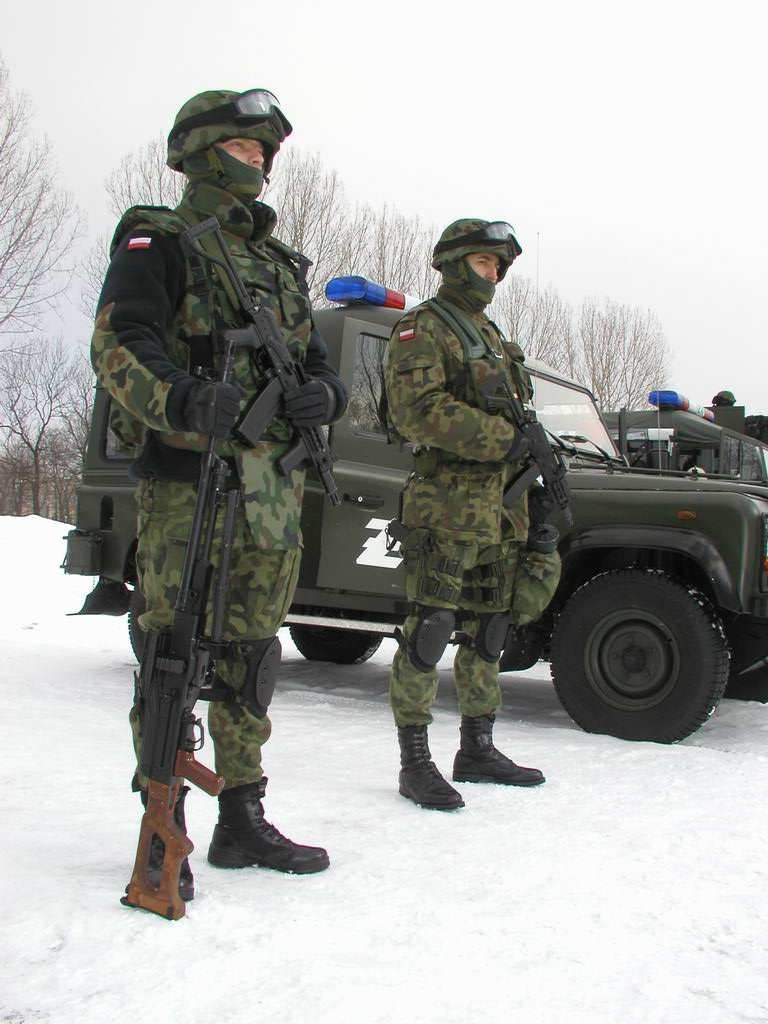
Polish Military Gendarmerie officers with their vehicle

Military organizations often have law enforcement units, generally referred to as military police. This may refer to:

- a section of the military solely responsible for policing the armed forces (referred to as provosts)
- a separate section of the armed forces responsible for policing in the armed forces and in the ministry of defence (such as the Żandarmeria Wojskowa)
- a section of the military solely responsible for policing the civilian population (such as the Romanian Gendarmerie)
- the preventative police, with military status, of a state (such as the Brazilian Military Police)

The exact usage and meaning of the terms military police, provost, security forces, and gendarmerie vary from country to country.

Non-military law enforcement agencies are sometimes referred to as civilian police in contexts where they need to be distinguished from military police. However, they may still possess a military-like structure and protocol.

=== Other ===
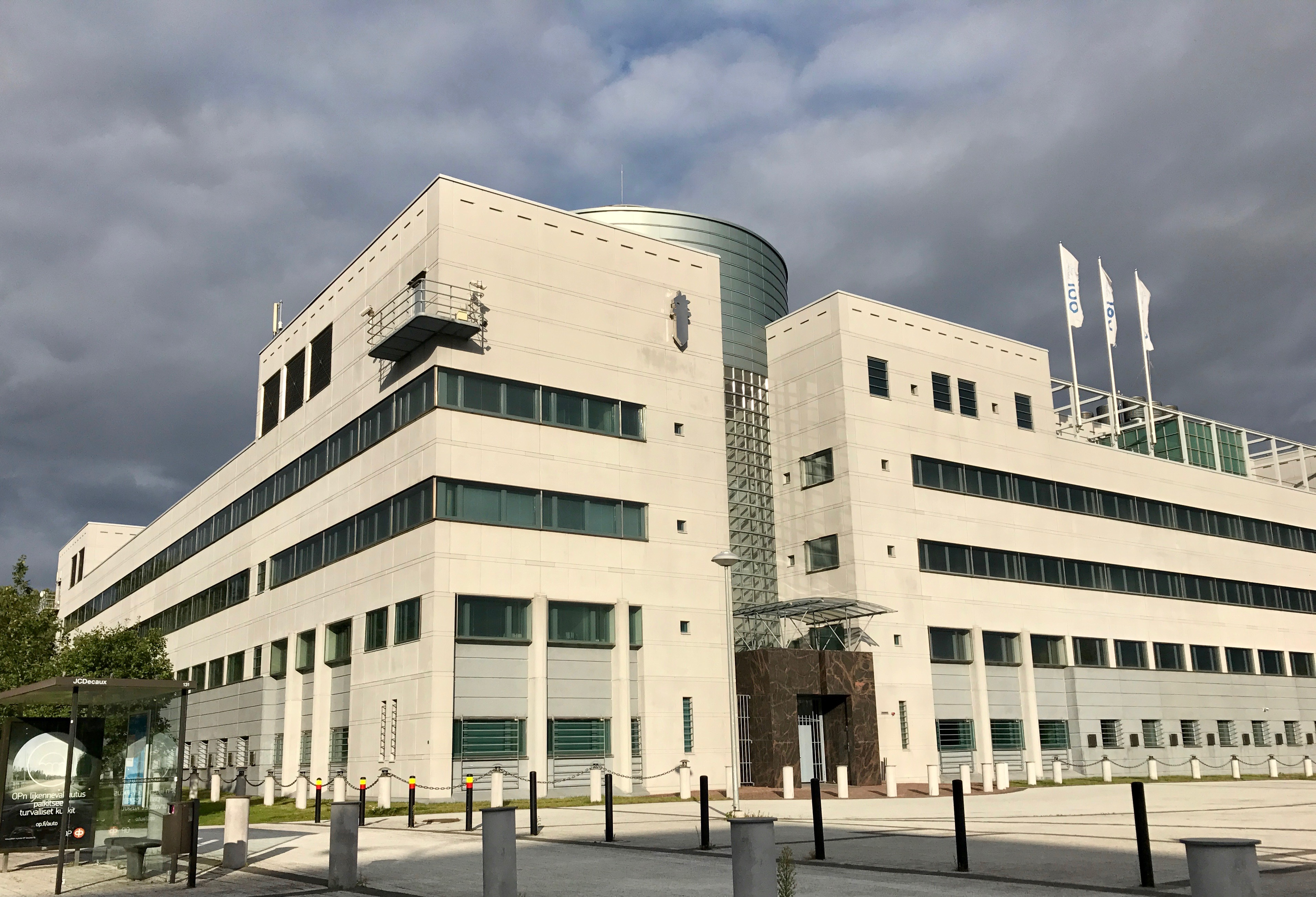
The National Bureau of Investigation (NBI) headquarters building in Tikkurila, Vantaa, Finland

Other responsibilities of LEAs typically involve assisting subjects in avoiding non-compliance with a law, in remaining safe and secure, and after a safety impacting event. These include:

- policing
  - social order
    - public incident mediation
    - pre-empting anti-social behaviour
    - dangerous event public logistics
  - public safety
    - general search and rescue
    - crowd control
    - police presence in public areas
- regulation
- services and facilities
- disaster victim identification
- education and awareness campaigns
  - victim prevention and avoidance
  - law compliance
  - public safety

Many LEAs have administrative and service responsibilities, often as their major responsibility, as well as their law enforcement responsibilities. This is typical of agencies such as customs or taxation agencies, which provide services and facilities to allow subjects to comply with relevant laws as their primary responsibilities.

==== Private ====
Private police are law enforcement bodies that are owned or controlled by non-governmental entities. Private police are often utilized in places where public law enforcement is seen as being under-provided. For example, the San Francisco Patrol Special Police was formed to increase security in San Francisco during the California gold rush and protected the homes and businesses of private clients until February 2024.

===== Railroad police =====
In Canada and the United States, many railroad companies have private railroad police, such as the BNSF Police Department, Canadian National Police Service, Canadian Pacific Kansas City Police Service, or Union Pacific Police Department, among others. The Canadian National Police Service and Canadian Pacific Kansas City Police Service operate in both countries while the others operate only in the US.

==== Regulatory ====
Many LEAs are also involved in the monitoring or application of regulations and codes of practice. See, for example, Australian Commercial Television Code of Practice, building code, and code enforcement. Monitoring of the application of regulations and codes of practice is not normally considered law enforcement. However, the consistent non-compliance by a subject with regulations or codes of practice may result in the revocation of a license for the subject to operate.

=== Religious ===
An LEA can be responsible for enforcing secular law or religious law such as Sharia or Halakha. The significant majority of LEAs around the world are secular, and their governing bodies separate religious matters from the governance of their subjects. Religious law enforcement agencies, such as Saudi Arabia's Mutaween or Iran's Guidance Patrol, exist where full separation of government and religious doctrine has not occurred and are generally considered police agencies, typically religious police, because their primary responsibility is for social order within their jurisdiction and the relevant social order being enforced with government law.

=== Internal affairs ===
An LEA will often have a specific internal unit, such as the US FBI's Office of Professional Responsibility, to ensure that the LEA is complying with relevant laws. In some countries and regions, specialized or separate LEAs, such as the New South Wales Independent Commission Against Corruption or the Ontario Special Investigations Unit, are established to ensure that other LEAs comply with laws and to investigate potential violations of laws by law enforcers.

== Establishment and constitution ==
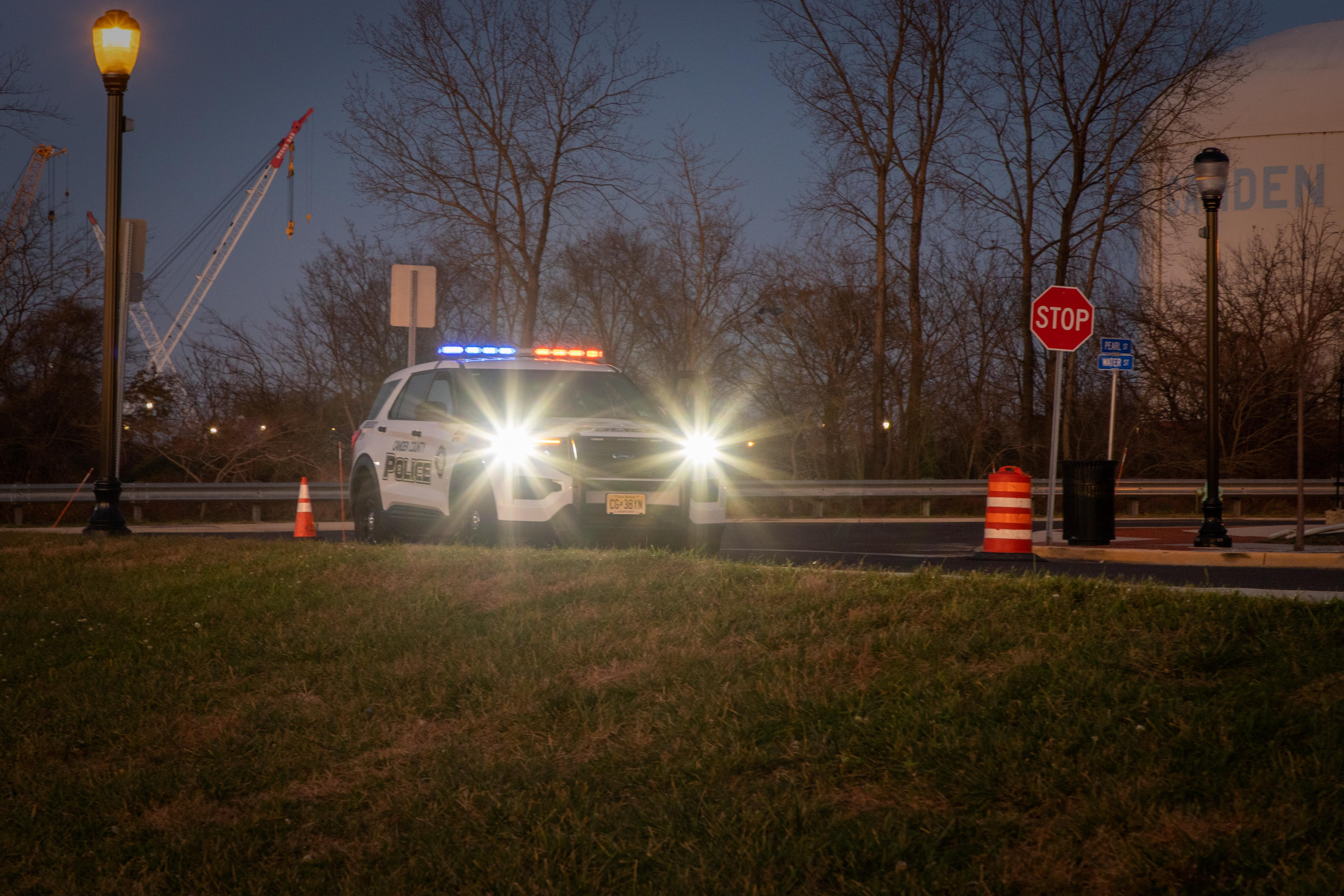
A Camden County Police Department vehicle. The Camden County Police Department was formed in 2013 as a reformation of the Camden Police Department, and has jurisdiction over the entirety of Camden County, New Jersey.

Typically, an LEA is established and constituted by the governing body it is supporting, and the personnel making up the LEA are from the governing body's subjects.

For reasons of either logistical efficiency or policy, some divisions within a country will not establish their own LEAs but will instead make arrangements with another LEA, typically from the same country, to provide law enforcement within the division. For example, the Royal Canadian Mounted Police (RCMP) is a federal agency and is contracted by most of Canada's provinces and many municipalities to police them, even though law enforcement in Canada is constitutionally a divided responsibility. This arrangement has been achieved by formal agreement between those provinces and municipalities and the federal government, reducing the number of agencies policing the same geographical area.

In circumstances where a country or division within a country cannot establish stable or effective LEAs, the country might invite other countries to provide personnel, experience, and organizational structure to constitute an LEA, such as the Regional Assistance Mission to the Solomon Islands, which has a Participating Police Force working in conjunction with the Solomon Islands Police Force. In circumstances where the United Nations is already providing an administrative support capability within the country, the United Nations may directly establish and constitute an LEA on behalf of the country, such as when the United Nations Transitional Administration in East Timor operated in Timor-Leste from 1999 to 2002; related is the United Nations Police, which helps provide law enforcement during United Nations peacekeeping missions.

== Powers and law exemptions ==
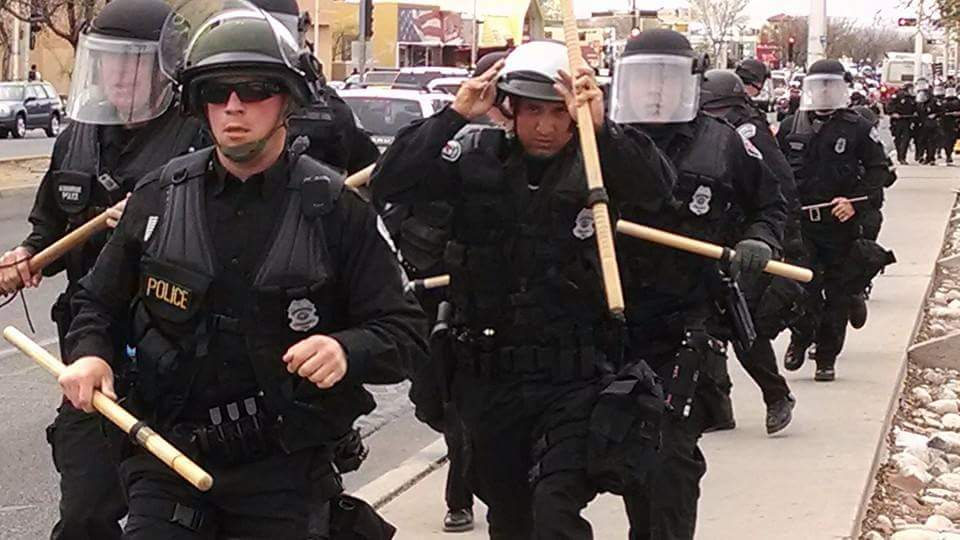
Albuquerque Police Department riot officers in 2014. Among the powers of LEAs are the use of force to conduct arrests and quell violence and unrest.

To enable an LEA to prevent, detect, and investigate non-compliance with laws, the LEA is endowed with powers by its governing body that are not available to non-LEA subjects of a governing body. Typically, an LEA is empowered to varying degrees to:

- collect information about subjects in the LEA's jurisdiction
- intrusively search for information and evidence related to the non-compliance with a law
- seize evidence of non-compliance with a law
- seize property and assets from subjects
- direct subjects to provide information related to the non-compliance with a law
- arrest and detain subjects, depriving them of their liberty, but not incarcerate subjects, for alleged non-compliance with a law
- lawfully deceive subjects

Usually, these powers are only allowed when there is probable cause that a subject is not complying with a law. For example, to undertake an intrusive search, an LEA typically must convince a judicial officer that an intrusive search is necessary to help detect or prove that a specified subject is non-compliant with a law. The judicial officer, if they agree, will then issue a legal instrument, typically called a search warrant, to the LEA, which must be presented to the relevant subject if possible.

=== Lawful deception and law exemption ===
Because subjects who do not comply with laws will often seek to avoid detection by an LEA, LEAs are given lawful exemption to undertake secret activities that explicitly do not comply with a law other subjects must comply with. Secret activities by an LEA are often referred to as covert operations.

To deceive a subject and carry out its activities, an LEA may be lawfully allowed to secretly:

- Create and operate false identities and personalities and organizations, often referred to as undercover operations or assumed identities, e.g., the Australian Federal Police by virtue of Part 1AC of the Crimes Act 1914.
- Allow and assist the illicit movement of licit and illicit substances and wares, sometimes partially substituted with benign materials, often referred to as controlled operations, e.g., Australia's LEAs by virtue of Part 1AB of the Crimes Act 1914.
- Listen to and copy communications between subjects, often referred to as telecommunications interception or wiretapping when the communication medium is electronic in nature, e.g., the U.S. Federal Bureau of Investigation by virtue of United States Code 18 Title 18 Part I Chapter 119 Section 2516.
- Intrusively observe, listen to, and track subjects, often referred to as technical operations, e.g., Australian LEAs by virtue of the Surveillance Devices Act 2004.
- Collect information about and evidence of non-compliance with a law and identify other non-complying subjects.

Lawful deception and use of law exemption by an LEA is typically subject to very strong judicial or open civil overview. For example, the Australian Federal Police's controlled operations are subject to open civil review by its governing body, the Parliament of Australia.

=== Other exemptions from laws ===
Law enforcement agencies have other exemptions from laws that allow them to operate in a practical way. For example, many jurisdictions have laws that forbid animals from entering certain areas for health and safety reasons. LEAs are typically exempted from these laws to allow dogs to be used for search and rescue, drug search, explosives search, chase and arrest, and other uses. Members of LEAs may be permitted to openly display firearms in places where this is typically prohibited to civilians, violate various traffic laws in the course of their duties, or detain persons against their will. These exemptions extend to international organizations such as Interpol, an international organization that is essentially stateless but must operate from some physical location. Interpol is protected from certain laws of the country where it is physically located.

== See also ==
- List of anti-corruption agencies
- Code enforcement
- List of law enforcement agencies grouped by sub category
  - List of protective service agencies
  - List of secret police organizations
  - List of specialist law enforcement agencies
- Outline of law enforcement
- Specialist law enforcement agency
- Traffic police
- State police
- Sheriff
- Police
- Police foundation
