= Ferguson Police Department =

Law enforcement agency of the city of Ferguson, Missouri, United States

Coordinates: 38°44′27″N 90°18′11″W

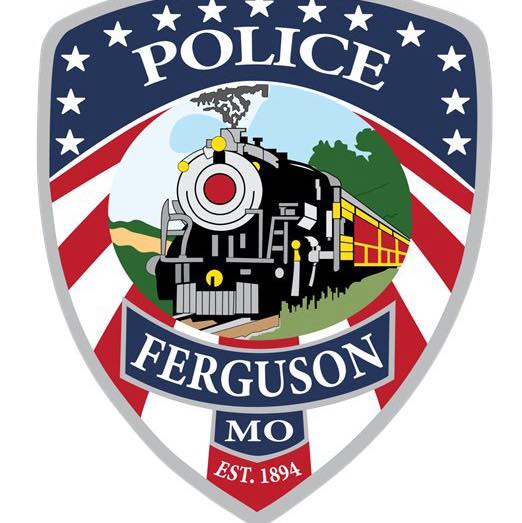

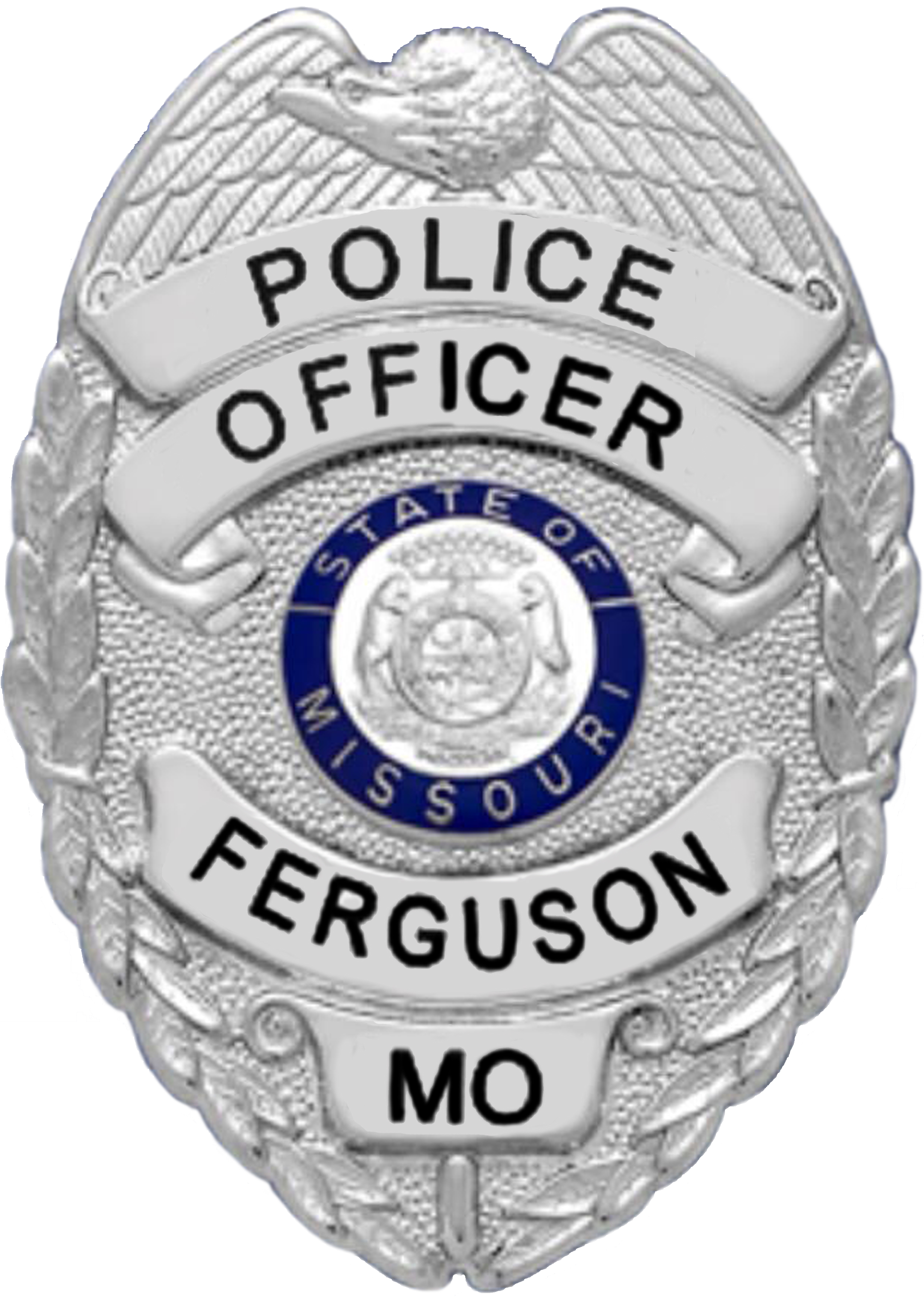
- Abbreviation: FPD

Agency overview
- Formed: 1894
- Employees: 62
- Annual budget: $9,808,993 USD (2024)

Jurisdictional structure
- Operations jurisdiction: Ferguson, Missouri, United States
- Map of Ferguson Police Department's jurisdiction
- Population: 18,143 (2024)
- Legal jurisdiction: Ferguson, Missouri
- Governing body: City council
- General nature: Local civilian police

Operational structure
- Headquarters: 222 S. Florissant Road
- Sworn members: 45
- Unsworn members: 17
- City Manager responsible: John Hampton
- Agency executive: Troy Doyle, Chief of Police
- Parent agency: Ferguson, Missouri

Facilities
- Detention centers: Ferguson Detention Center 222 S. Florissant Road
- Marked and Unmarkeds: 100 +
- K-9s: 3

Website
- Official website

The Ferguson Police Department (FPD) is a law enforcement agency serving Ferguson, Missouri.

Chief Troy Doyle was appointed as the chief of police of Ferguson Police on Mar 27, 2023 by Interim City Manager John Hampton, and is Ferguson's fifth African-American chief of police.

A federal investigation by the United States Department of Justice initiated in the aftermath of the 2014 Ferguson unrest, found that the Ferguson police department routinely stereotyped and discriminated against African American residents in violation of the Constitution.

== Organization ==
The Ferguson Police Department includes sixty including fifty - two officers and fifteen civilian support staff. The officers are all police academy graduates and certified peace officers by the Missouri Department of Public Safety.

Three supervisors as well as the chief are graduates of the FBI National Academy. Many officers have bachelors or advanced degrees. All officers participate in advanced continuous training in numerous areas of law enforcement.

In addition to uniformed patrols of policemen and criminal investigation detectives, the department is supplemented with four K-9 officers, a bicycle patrol, and a traffic unit. The department has its own correctional facility, maintains evidence and property, and on-site indoor firearms range.

The department's relationship with the community is enhanced by commitment of personnel to the positions of community relations, business liaison, Drug Abuse Resistance Education, and school resource officers.

== Rank structure ==
Title	Insignia
Chief of Police	
Assistant Chief	
Captain	
Lieutenant	
Sergeant	
Police corporal	
Police Officer	

== Equipment ==
=== Vehicles ===
- Dodge Chargers
- Chevy Tahoes
- Dodge Durangos
- Ford Crown Victoria Police Interceptor Limited numbers still active
- Humvee (Until 2015)

=== Weapons ===
- SIG Sauer P229 .40-caliber semiautomatic handgun
- AR-15 rifle
- Taser conducted electrical weapon

=== Body cameras ===
In late August 2014, Ferguson police officers began wearing body-mounted video cameras donated by Safety Visions and Digital Ally. Fifty cameras were donated.

On December 1, 2014 President Barack Obama announced that the federal government will spend US$75 million on body cameras for law enforcement officers, as one of the measures taken in response to the shooting in Ferguson.

== Incidents ==
=== 2009 Henry Davis incident ===
In September 2009, officers mistakenly arrested Henry Davis based on an outstanding warrant for another man with the same name. While in custody, Davis was beaten by four officers. Davis was charged with "property damage" supposedly for bleeding on the officers' uniforms. Davis had been arrested on suspicion of driving under the influence. Davis later pleaded guilty to two reduced charges and filed a lawsuit against the officers and the department. On July 28, 2015, an appeals court ruled that Davis could continue his excessive-force suit against the Ferguson Police Department.

=== Hiring issue ===
Between July 2009 and December 2010, the department hired a police officer who had previously been fired from the St. Louis County Police Department after being accused of assaulting two minors, one a 12-year-old girl, with his service weapon. The officer was acquitted of the charges in 2010. A state commission found the man had committed "a criminal act".

=== 2011 death of Jason Moore ===
In September 2011, a Ferguson police officer used a TASER device on Jason Moore. After Moore ran down the street yelling and pounding on cars, the officer used the TASER device on him. When Moore tried to get up from the ground, the officer used the TASER twice more and Moore then stopped breathing. He died of a heart attack. His family filed a wrongful death lawsuit against the Ferguson Police Department for the death. On November 4, 2016, a federal jury awarded $3 million to the family. Although the city initially appealed the jury verdict, it later agreed on February 1, 2017 to pay the full amount to settle the lawsuit and end the case.

=== 2014 shooting of Michael Brown and unrest ===
On August 9, 2014, Michael Brown, an unarmed teenager, was fatally shot by Ferguson police officer Darren Wilson after Brown failed to heed directions to stop and started charging Officer Wilson. Brown attacked the officer, fracturing the officer's skull and struggle for control of the officer's service weapon. Brown was shot while facing the officer according to FBI reports. Chief of Police Tom Jackson claimed in a news conference that Brown had been a suspect in a "strong-arm" robbery, but later stated that the robbery was not connected to Officer Wilson's interaction with Brown. The later Department of Justice investigation later described Officer Wilson as having heard the description of the robbery and suspect before he encountered Brown, although Officer Wilson could not recount the specifics of what he heard.

Both peaceful protests and civil disorder began following Brown's shooting and lasted for several days. Police grappled with establishing curfews and maintaining order, inciting further unrest. On August 10, a day of memorials began peacefully, but some crowd members became unruly after an evening candlelight vigil. Local police stations assembled approximately 150 officers in riot gear.

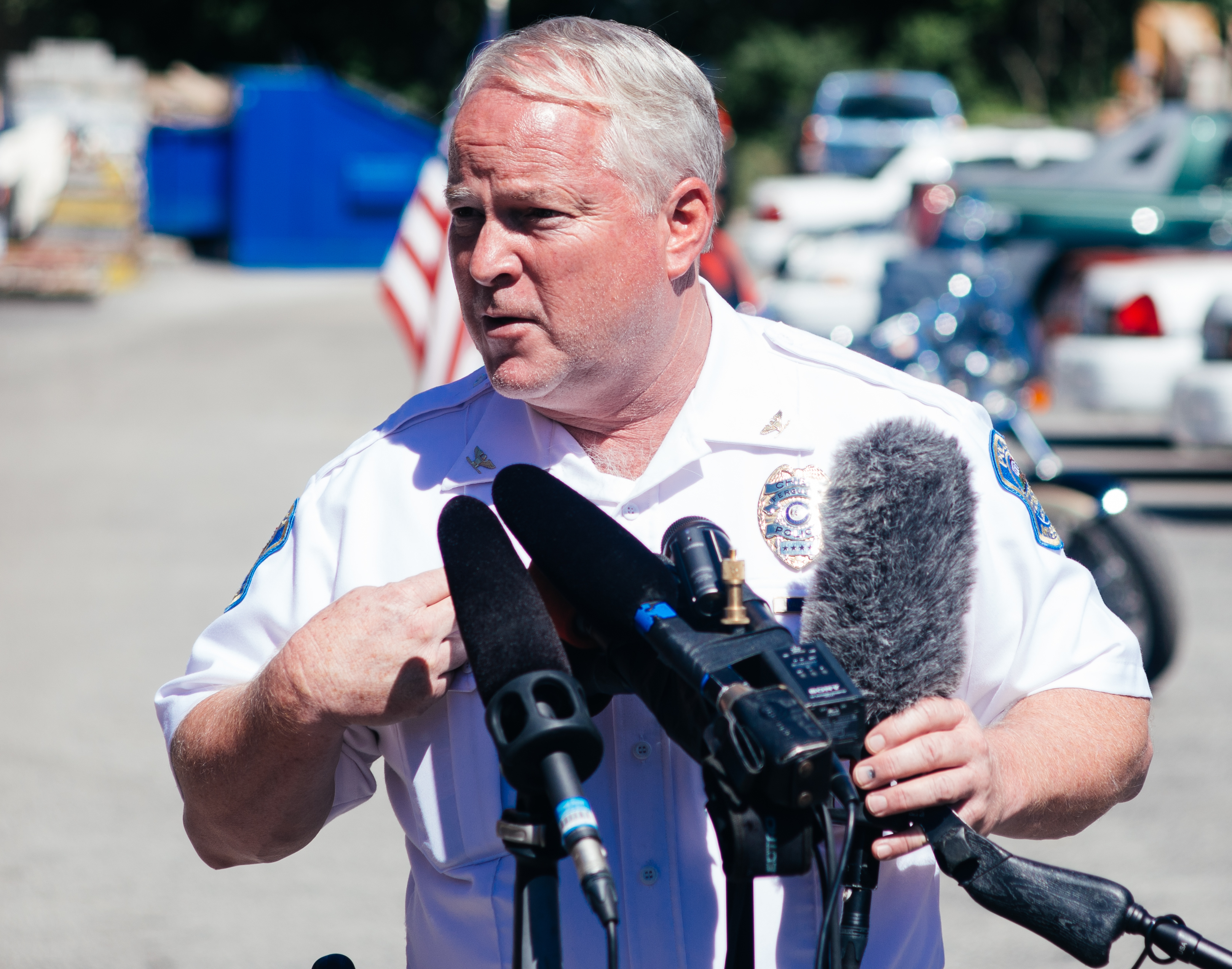
Tom Jackson at a press conference in Ferguson, Missouri

Chief of Police Tom Jackson drew criticism for his department's release of information about Brown's death, which was described by the Associated Press as "infrequent" and "erratic", as well as for the aggressive response to the unrest.

Jackson said that his top priority in Ferguson was race relations and committed to reach across the racial, economic, and generational divides in the community to find solutions, and said he welcomed the Justice Department training on racial relations between police and the residents, in which two-thirds of the residents are black and all but three of the police force's fifty-three officers are white.

Six weeks after the incident, a press relations firm released a video in which Jackson apologized to Brown's family for taking too long to remove Brown's body from the street, and to the peaceful protesters who felt they couldn't exercise their Constitutional rights, saying that "For any mistakes I've made, I take full responsibility". He also said that he was truly sorry for the loss of their son. An attorney for Brown's family responded that the apology came at a time in which trust in Jackson "has reached an irreversible low".

On October 24, Amnesty International published a report detailing human rights abuses by Ferguson police. The report cited the use of lethal force in Brown's death, racial discrimination and excessive use of police force, imposition of restrictions on the rights to protest, intimidation of protesters, the use of tear gas, rubber bullets, and long range acoustic devices, restrictions imposed on the media covering the protests, and lack of accountability for law enforcement policing protests.

A grand jury declined to indict Wilson which led to further protests, some of which were violent. This incident and the aftermath resulted in world-wide criticism of police tactics and highlighted racism in the United States. The U.S. Department of Justice concluded Wilson shot Brown in self-defense.

=== Justice Department investigation and report ===
In September 2014, the United States Justice Department initiated a civil rights investigation to examine concerns about the Ferguson Police Department's practices, as well as reviewing its internal investigations of use of force during the preceding four years. Jackson said he welcomed the investigation. The DOJ investigation concluded that police officers in Ferguson routinely violated the constitutional rights of the city's residents by applying racial stereotypes and discriminating against African-Americans. Internal City of Ferguson e-mails indicated that town officials have been viewing the department as a revenue source.

An article in The Washington Post highlighted key insights gleaned from the report, which they describe as "scathing", including:

- The city's practices were shaped by revenue rather than by public safety needs.
- A single missed, late or partial payment of a fine could mean jail time.
- Arrest warrants were "almost exclusively" used as threats to push for payments.
- The 67% of African Americans in Ferguson account for 93% of arrests made from 2012–2014.
- The disproportionate number of arrests, tickets and use of force stemmed from "at least in part, because of unlawful bias," rather than black people committing more crime.
- Officers used canines in law enforcement, but in every dog bite incident reported, the person bitten was Black.
- From October 2012 to October 2014, every time a person was arrested for "resisting arrest," that person was Black.

The Los Angeles Times published a piece addressing a municipal code called "manner of walking along roadway" described in the report. This code is designed to require pedestrians to walk on the sidewalks or on the side of the road, but according to the report, Ferguson police used the code to harass Blacks, with African Americans accounting for 95% of "manner of walking along roadway" charges from 2011 to 2013. The town imposes the highest fines in the region for violations of "manner of walking."

VOX summarized key findings in the report, including police and municipal officials sending racist emails, police arresting Black residents when they were trying to care for loved ones who were hurt, officers abusing their power and disregarding the law as part of the department's culture while supervisors supported them, and the police department's using race to dictate who would be stopped and the level of force used against them.

Chief Jackson resigned on March 11, 2015, following the release of the Justice Department report and the firing of five Ferguson city officials and police officers. His resignation became effective March 19, when Lieutenant Colonel Al Eickhoff took over as acting chief. The decision to let Jackson resign rather than be fired is controversial, particularly since his contract was to expire in March anyway and his resignation guaranteed him one year of pay and one year's continuation of his paid health insurance.
