= List of law enforcement officers killed in the line of duty in Canada =

This is a list of law enforcement officers killed in the line of duty in Canada. Unlike its neighbour, the United States, Canada lacks a complete database like that of the Officer Down Memorial Page. As a result, this list will never be fully complete, and can only include those deaths that are documented in one way or another. As such, deaths that lack documentation such as numerous law enforcement deaths prior to Confederation, and those law enforcement officers who died in the Halifax Explosion and Lower Canada Rebellion cannot be included. Additionally, due to the dynamic nature of this list, it requires regular edits to keep it up to date. This list also includes those who died in the line of duty outside of Canada, excluding peacekeeping missions and wars.

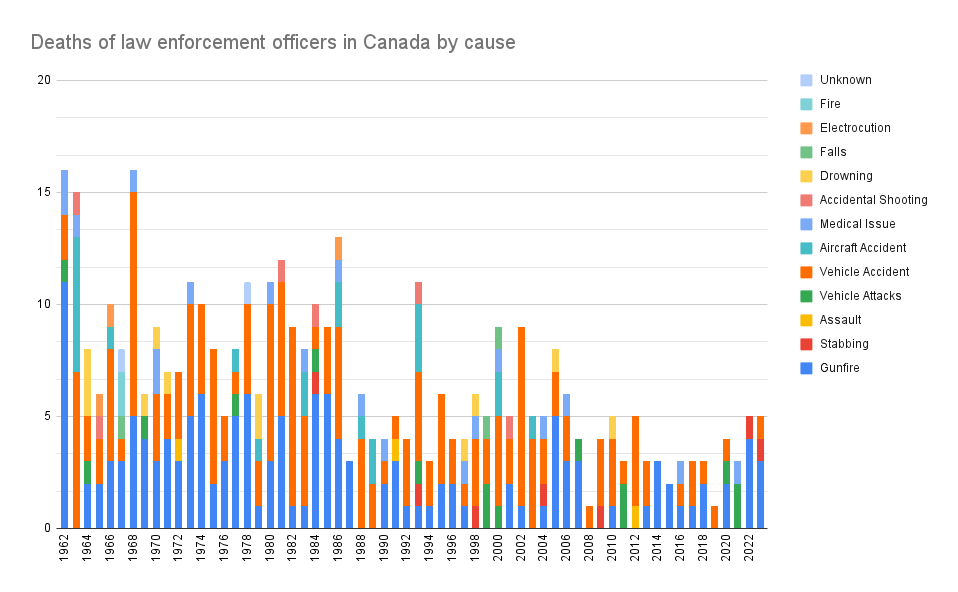
Stacked bar chart of Canadian law enforcement deaths in the line of duty from 1962 through 2023.

== Police in Canada ==
For the most part, law enforcement in Canada fall under three categories; Federal, Provincial, and Municipal. The RCMP, the Canadian Forces Military Police, Canadian Pacific Police Service and the Canadian National Police Service, are Canada's four federal police forces. There are also various civil law enforcement agencies including Parks Canada Park Wardens and Fisheries and Oceans Canada Fishery Officers. Provincially maintained law enforcement can be different from province to province. Large police forces such as the Ontario Provincial Police and the Sûreté du Québec can have a broad range of duties including frontline policing. Other provincial law enforcement like the Alberta Sheriffs perform more specialized services including highway patrol, prisoner transport, and fugitive apprehension. There are 138 municipal police forces in Canada, with varying size from the Toronto Police Service with 5,500 officers to Luseland, Saskatchewan's police service with only one officer.

== List ==
=== Prior to 1900 ===
Prior to 1900

Name and rank	Agency	Location	Date	Details
High County Constable John Fisk	Constable for King Township	Lake Ontario	October 7, 1804	Fisk was transporting a prisoner on board the HMS Speedy when the ship sank during a fierce storm
Constable Timothy C. Pomeroy	Constable for Middlesex County	Bayham Township, Upper Canada (present-day Ontario)	September 16, 1829	Shot and killed by Cornelius Burleigh while investigating a possible chicken thief.
Village Constable Charles Richards	Constable for Port Robinson	Port Robinson, Province of Canada (present-day Ontario)	October 2, 1854	Shot by robbery suspect while attempting to arrest him
Constable Jeremiah Dunn	Royal Newfoundland Constabulary	Harbour Grace, Crown Colony of Newfoundland (Dominion of Newfoundland) (present day Newfoundland and Labrador)	October 22, 1861	Killed by a crowd of people hurling stones while trying to arrest a drunk man
Constable Mathew Gardner	Halifax Regional Police	Halifax, Colony of Nova Scotia (present-day Nova Scotia)	November 5, 1861	Fatally stabbed
Inspector of Fisheries William Gibbard	Fisheries and Oceans Canada	Lake Huron between Manitoulin Island and Killarney, Province of Canada	July 28, 1863	Pushed overboard the steamship Ploughboy
Constable John Lawson	British Columbia Provincial Police	Kootenay District, Colony of British Columbia (present-day British Columbia)	May 27, 1867	Shot and killed by horse thief Charles "one ear" Brown
Chief Constable Charles Calpin	Terra Nova Constabulary	Bay Roberts, Crown Colony of Newfoundland (Dominion of Newfoundland) (present day Newfoundland and Labrador)	August 9, 1870	Accidentally shot himself
Constable George Clarke	Quebec Provincial Police	Quebec City, Quebec	August 31, 1875	Murdered by a drunken carter outside a hotel
Sub Constable John D. Nash	NWMP	Fort Macleod, N.W.T. (present-day Alberta)	March 11, 1876	Crushed by logs he was hauling in a horse accident
Sergeant Lazare Doré	Quebec Provincial Police	Beauce, Quebec	September 29, 1877	Shot and killed while pursuing a criminal
Constable Marmaduke Graburn	NWMP	Cypress Hills, N.W.T. (present-day Alberta or Saskatchewan)	November 17, 1879	Murdered by unknown assailants
Constable John Morrison	Constable for Russell County	Bearbrook, Ontario	June 27, 1880	Shot in the face and killed by a suspect who is believed to have fled to Brazil
Constable Claudius S. Hooley	NWMP	Belly River near Fort Macleod, N.W.T. (present-day Alberta)	July 24, 1880	Drowned along with four horses in the Belly River
Sergeant Thomas Fennessey	Royal Newfoundland Constabulary	Betts Cove, Crown Colony of Newfoundland (Dominion of Newfoundland) (present day Newfoundland and Labrador)	January 27, 1884	Died in an accident
Constable George Pearce Arnold	NWMP	Duck Lake, N.W.T. (present-day Saskatchewan)	March 26, 1885	Died in the Battle of Duck Lake during the North-West Rebellion
Constable George Knox Garrett	NWMP	Duck Lake, N.W.T. (present-day Saskatchewan)	March 26, 1885	Died in the Battle of Duck Lake during the North-West Rebellion
Constable Thomas James Gibson	NWMP	Duck Lake, N.W.T. (present-day Saskatchewan)	March 26, 1885	Died in the Battle of Duck Lake during the North-West Rebellion
Constable David Latimer Cowan	NWMP	Fort Pitt, N.W.T. (present-day Saskatchewan)	April 15, 1885	Died in the Battle of Fort Pitt during the North-West Rebellion
Corporal Ralph Bateman Sleigh	NWMP	Cut Knife, N.W.T. (present-day Saskatchewan)	May 2, 1885	Died in the Battle of Cut Knife, during the North-West Rebellion
Constable Patrick Burke	NWMP	Cut Knife, N.W.T. (present-day Saskatchewan)	May 3, 1885	Died in the Battle of Cut Knife, during the North-West Rebellion
Corporal William Hay Talbot Lowry	NWMP	Cut Knife, N.W.T. (present-day Saskatchewan)	May 3, 1885	Died in the Battle of Cut Knife, during the North-West Rebellion
Constable Frank Orlando Elliott	NWMP	Near Battleford, N.W.T. (present-day Saskatchewan)	May 14, 1885	Died in a rebel attack during the North-West Rebellion
Constable Alfred Perry	NWMP	Belly River near Lethbridge, N.W.T. (present-day Alberta)	June 8, 1889	Washed off his horse and drowned during high waters while trying to ford
Constable George Quiqueran Rene Saveuse DeBeaujeu	NWMP	Lake Winnipeg, Manitoba	September 8, 1890	Drowned when a police boat capsized in a storm
Constable Harry Oliver Morphy	NWMP	Lake Winnipeg, Manitoba	September 8, 1890	Drowned when a police boat capsized in a storm
Constable William T. Reading	NWMP	Fort Calgary, N.W.T. (present-day Alberta)	December 14, 1890	Horse accident
Constable William Pope	London Police Service	London, Ontario	January 7, 1891	Died in a wagon accident
Constable James Herron	NWMP	St. Mary River near Kipp, N.W.T. (present-day Alberta)	March 2, 1891	Cst. James Herron was found after being lost in a blizzard lying down with his revolver with a gunshot through his head. It wasn't determined whether it was suicide, murder, or an accident.
Constable John Robert Davey	Cornwall Police Service	Cornwall, Ontario	September 6, 1892	Fatally shot while trying to break up a gunfight at a circus
Detective Henry H. Phair	London Police Service	London, Ontario	October 19, 1892	Killed during a struggle with two gunmen
Constable Robert Rankin	Chatham Police Service	Jericho, Ontario	January 25, 1893	Beat to death with a club, an axe, and a hoe by a freedman wanted for relations with a girl and his two brothers
Constable William Lindsay	Comber Police	Comber, Ontario	May 3, 1894	Killed by a drunken disgruntled farmer by a shot to the abdomen
Constable Alexander Wright	Brockville Police Service	Brockville, Ontario	September 19, 1895	Died by a heart attack during a pursuit
Sergeant Colin Campbell Colebrook	NWMP	Kinistino, N.W.T. (present-day Saskatchewan)	October 29, 1895	Killed by an escaping prisoner
Constable Oscar Alexander Kern	NWMP	Short Creek, near Estevan, N.W.T. (present-day Saskatchewan)	April 7, 1896	Drowned while on patrol
Constable John Radolph Kerr	NWMP	Minichinas Hills, N.W.T. (present-day Saskatchewan)	May 28, 1897	Killed while trying to apprehend the killer of Cst. Colebrook
Corporal Charles Horne Stirling Hockin	NWMP	Minichinas Hills, N.W.T. (present-day Saskatchewan)	May 29, 1897	Killed while trying to apprehend the killer of Cst. Colebrook
Sergeant William Brock Wilde	NWMP	North-West Territories (present-day Alberta)	November 10, 1896	Sgt. Wilde was killed by Blood Indian outlaw Charcoal, who was later captured and hanged for his murder
Constable John Hickey	Brantford Police Service	Brantford, Ontario	June 29, 1897	Seriously injured in a tram accident in 1895, succumbed to his injuries in 1897
Constable Michael Toohey	London Police Service	London, Ontario	June 24. 1898	Shot while arresting Marion Brown, who had escaped jail in Texas

=== 1900–1950 ===
1900–1950

Name and rank	Agency	Location	Date	Details
Special Constable Stick Sam	NWMP	Kaskawulsh River, Yukon	July 29, 1903	Drowned while on patrol
Staff Sergeant Arthur F.M. Brooke	NWMP	Siksika 146, N.W.T. (present-day Alberta)	September 26, 1903	Drowned while fording the Bow River on the Blackfoot Reserve
Constable James Barron	Hamilton Police Service	Hamilton, Ontario	October 27, 1903	Attacked by three men while inspecting a disturbance in a backyard. Fatally shot below the heart.
Provincial Constable William Irving Jr.	Ontario Provincial Police (Sudbury District)	Webbwood, Ontario	June 17, 1904	Shot by a concealed gun while escorting a suspect off a train
Constable Joseph Russell	NWMP	Near Cape Fullerton, N.W.T. (present-day Nunavut)	July 5, 1905	Drowned while on duty
Constable Thomas Robert Jackson	NWMP	Near Maple Creek, Saskatchewan	June 8, 1906	Drowned while fording Six Mile Creek
Corporal Alexander Gardner Haddock	NWMP	Yukon River near Ogilvie, Yukon	June 14, 1906	Drowned while on patrol
Assistant Surgeon Walter Stafford Flood	NWMP	Churchill, Manitoba	November 29, 1906	Died from exposure
High County Constable Archibald Pow	Woodstock Police Service	Beachville, Ontario	March 13, 1907	Died of a heart attack during a buggy crash
Constable John Acton	Toronto Police Service	Toronto, Ontario	March 27, 1908	Jumped by thugs behind a hotel. Died of complications.
Constable George Ernest Willmett	NWMP	Frank, Alberta	April 12, 1908	Murdered by burglar duo Fritz Ebert and Mathias Jasbec
Sergeant Ralph Morton L. Donaldson	NWMP	Marble Island, N.W.T. (present-day Nunavut)	August 14, 1908	Drowned during a walrus attack on his police boat
Special Constable Isaac Decker	British Columbia Provincial Police	near Ashcroft, British Columbia	June 28, 1909	While posted on the Thompson River to search for train robbers, S/Cst. Decker ordered two brothers on a boat to come ashore. During an altercation, S/Cst. Decker fired, killing David Haney, but was shot and killed by William Haney. Despite an intensive search, William Haney was never found.
Constable John Hallworth Jr.	Canadian Pacific Police Service	Fort William, Ontario	August 12, 1909	Shot with buckshot during a railroad strike. Died during an operation to remove it.
Special Constable Samuel Carter	NWMP	55 miles west of Fort McPherson, Northwest Territories	February 14, 1911	Part of the Dawson-McPherson Lost Patrol, died of exposure, starvation and exhaustion
Inspector Francis Joseph Fitzgerald	NWMP	55 miles west of Fort McPherson, Northwest Territories	February 14, 1911	Part of the Dawson-McPherson Lost Patrol, died of exposure, starvation and exhaustion
Constable George Frances Kinney	NWMP	55 miles west of Fort McPherson, Northwest Territories	February 14, 1911	Part of the Dawson-McPherson Lost Patrol, died of exposure, starvation and exhaustion
Constable Richard O'Hara Taylor	NWMP	55 miles west of Fort McPherson, Northwest Territories	February 14, 1911	Part of the Dawson-McPherson Lost Patrol, died of exposure, starvation and exhaustion
Constable John Beattie	Winnipeg Police Service	Winnipeg, Manitoba	April 13, 1911	Accidentally electrocuted
Constable Francis Walter Davies	NWMP	Brooks, Alberta	June 3, 1912	Killed while attempting an arrest
Constable Robert George MacIntosh	Canadian Pacific Police Service	Calgary, Alberta	September 4, 1912	Shot while inspecting rail boxes, suspect was never found
Constable Lewis Byers	Vancouver Police Department	Vancouver, British Columbia	March 25, 1912	Killed by a gunshot to the heart
Lance Corporal John Baker	Canadian Forces Military Police	Toronto, Ontario	December 1, 1912	Struck by a vehicle
Corporal Maxwell George Bailey	NWMP	Grassy Lake, Alberta	April 23, 1913	Killed while apprehending a suspect
Constable Mathew Hamilton	Stratford Police Service	Stratford, Ontario	May 13, 1913	Killed by a falling piece of timber while responding to a church fire.
Chief John A. McCarthy Jr.	Stratford Police Service	Stratford, Ontario	May 13, 1913	Killed by a falling piece of timber while responding to a church fire.
Constable James Archibald	Vancouver Police Department	Vancouver, British Columbia	May 28, 1913	Found by police after failing to return to station with 3 gunshots in a vacant lot.
Acting Sergeant Paul Smith	Lethbridge Police Service	Lethbridge, Alberta	June 10, 1913	Accidentally electrocuted
Constable Michael James Fitzgerald	NWMP	Near the head of the White River, Yukon	August 27, 1913	Drowned while travelling to his new post
Constable John McMenomy	Vancouver Police Department	Vancouver, British Columbia	November 1, 1913	Died by accidental electrocution
Detective Richard Levis	Vancouver Police Department	Vancouver, British Columbia	August 27, 1914	Shot point-blank with a sawed-off shotgun by stabbing suspect T.T. McKillarney while searching his house
Chief Constable Malcolm MacLennan	Vancouver Police Department	Vancouver, British Columbia	March 20, 1917	During a nearly two-day siege, cocaine addict Robert Tait shot his landlord, permanently blinded two police officers, and killed Chief Constable Malcolm MacLennan and 8-year-old George Robb before killing himself after hours of an intense stand-off.
Constable Arthur Duncan	Calgary Police Service	Calgary, Alberta	July 2, 1917	Surprised a burglar during his night patrol and was shot. His killer was never found.
Constable Alexander Lamont	NWMP	Herschel Island, Yukon	February 16, 1918	Died of typhoid fever contracted while helping a sick arctic explorer
Lance Corporal Joseph Tatum	Canadian Forces Military Police	Regina, Saskatchewan	April 30, 1918	On-duty automobile accident
Acting Sergeant Robert McGregor Stewart	Canadian Forces Military Police	Ottawa, Ontario	July 25, 1918	Died in a horse accident
Constable Frank Beevers	Edmonton Police Service	Edmonton, Alberta	October 17, 1918	Killed while attempting to arrest a fugitive wanted for robbery and murder
Detective Frank A. Williams	Toronto Police Service	Toronto, Ontario	November 19, 1918	Shot twice through the heart by Frank McCullough, who was later hanged for his murder.
Sergeant Samuel James Arniel	Kingston Police Force	Kingston, Ontario	April 19, 1919	Died of a heart attack during a struggle with a prisoner
Staff Sergeant George H.L. Bossange	NWMP	Spirit River, Alberta	June 21, 1919	Struck by lightning while on patrol
Constable George Armstrong	Nipigon Police Service	West of Nipigon, Ontario	July 18, 1919	Ambushed and shot while investigating a break-and-enter
Constable William Nixon	Edmonton Police Service	Edmonton, Alberta	August 31, 1919	Shot and killed in the line of duty
County Constable Albert C. Springstead	Constable of Wentworth County	Hamilton, Ontario	November 29, 1919	Beaten to death by prisoner while keeping deathwatch
Corporal Ernest Usher	RCMP	Bellevue, Alberta	August 7, 1920	Killed while trying to apprehend train bandits
Constable Frederick W.E. Bailey	Alberta Provincial Police	Bellevue, Alberta	August 7, 1920	Killed while trying to apprehend train bandits
Special Constable Nick Kyslik	Alberta Provincial Police	Bellevue, Alberta	August 8, 1920	Shot while trying to apprehend train bandits, died the day after
Sergeant Arthur George Searle	RCMP	near Creston, British Columbia	May 15, 1921	Drowned while chasing bootleggers
Constable Richard A. Beard	Napanee Police	Napanee, Ontario	August 28, 1921	Shot and killed by a trio of brothers while on a patrol at night
Constable Frank Henry Sissons	Alberta Provincial Police	Alberta	September 6, 1921	Accidentally shot and killed by fellow police officer
Constable Reginald Pryer	Hamilton Police Service	Hamilton, Ontario	September 12, 1921	Died in a motorcycle accident
Constable George Edward Osgoode	Alberta Provincial Police	Kinuso, Alberta	January 25, 1922	Shot and killed by a bootlegger
Corporal William Andrew Doak	RCMP	Tree River, N.W.T. (present-day Nunavut)	April 1, 1922	Doak was shot and killed in his sleep by 18-year-old Alikomiak, who had escaped his jail cell after being arrested for his involvement in the killing of five natives. After killing Doak, Alikomiak also went on to shoot and kill Hudson's Bay Company worker Otto Binder. Alikomiak was hanged in 1924 for the seven total murders.
Constable Anthony Tierney	Canadian Pacific Police Service	Moose Jaw, Saskatchewan	April 8, 1922	Shot while trying to apprehend a person breaking into a rail car
County Constable William Lorenzo Pickard	Constable for Kent County	Chatham, Ontario	April 17, 1922	Died in the hospital from complications after being shot in the foot by a suspect
Constable William M. Holloway	Guelph Police Service	Guelph, Ontario	May 2, 1922	Died after being struck by a vehicle while on bicycle patrol
Constable Stephen O. Lawson	Alberta Provincial Police	Coleman, Alberta	September 21, 1922	Shot and killed by bootleggers Emilio Picariello and Florence Lassandro as revenge for shooting and injuring Steve Picariello, their son.
Constable Robert McBeath	Vancouver Police Department	Vancouver, British Columbia	October 9, 1922	Shot and killed while arresting Fred Deal for erratic driving
Constable John Robert Smythe	Ontario Provincial Police (Fort Erie)	near Fort Erie, Ontario	December 9, 1922	Died in a car accident
Constable Joseph Trueman	Thorold Police	Thorold, Ontario	December 17, 1922	Cst. Trueman was killed while on night patrol after bootleggers placed a $100 bounty on his head
Constable Charles Nicolay Paris	Drumheller Police Service	Drumheller, Alberta	May 3, 1923	Died in crash while struggling for control of a vehicle with bootlegger Elmo E. Trider.
Constable Fred LeFebvre	North Bay Police Service	west of North Bay, Ontario	May 18, 1923	Cst. LeFebvre was killed by criminal Leo Rogers in a gun battle at the mouth of Mosquito Creek, ~20 km west of North Bay
Sergeant John Urquhart	Ontario Provincial Police (Cobalt)	North Bay, Ontario	May 30, 1923	Killed by criminal Leo Rogers through the door of his house. Rogers was killed by police the following day.
Constable Charles R. Fulton	Halifax Regional Police	Halifax, Nova Scotia	July 14, 1924	The only fatality in a day-long gunfight with bandits
Constable Ian M. MacDonald	RCMP	Indian River east of the Herschel Island detachment, Yukon	August 18, 1924	Drowned
Park Warden Andrew Bower	Parks Canada Park Warden	Waterton Lakes National Park, Alberta	June 6, 1925	Died in a horse accident
Constable Leo Francis Cox	RCMP	La Sarre, Quebec	June 28, 1925	Drowned while on duty
Traffic Officer John E. Waddell	Department of Highways	London, Ontario	September 12, 1925	Shot by chicken thief George Edward Harlton while attempting to arrest him. Harlton was executed in 1929.
Constable Frederick Raynes	Hamilton Police Service	Hamilton, Ontario	November 21, 1925	Died from injuries received in a motorcycle accident
Ontario Game Warden John Billings	Ministry of Natural Resources	near Whitney, Ontario	January 8, 1926	Billings and guide Joe Stringer left to search for a local poacher. When they did not return, a search party found a burnt cabin with charred remains on January 20. Items identified as belonging to the men were found. Despite evidence pointing to the poacher, including shell casings and footprints leading to his cabin, he was acquitted after providing an alibi supported by relatives.
Game Warden S. Clark Russell	Ministry of Natural Resources	Bancroft, Ontario	May 3, 1926	Drowned
Ontario Temperance Act Inspector Thomas H. Constable	Cochrane Police	Haileybury, Ontario	October 15, 1926	Shot outside his home by a bootlegger.
Fisheries Officer Agapit Leblanc	Fisheries and Oceans Canada	Bouctouche, New Brunswick	October 20, 1926	Murdered while investigating illegal smelt fishing. His death has never been solved.
Constable Frederick Rhodes	RCMP	Rae, Northwest Territories	December 16, 1926	Died from injuries received during a fire at the RCMP detachment
Constable Charles W. St. Charles	Madoc Police	near Eldorado, Ontario	December 22, 1926	Died from injuries received after being ambushed by Abraham Robinson and shot in the chest
Traffic Officer William O.K. McGillivary	Department of Highways	Hamilton, Ontario	October 1, 1927	Died in the hospital after a motorcycle accident
Traffic Officer Andrew McKay	Department of Highways	Holland Landing, Ontario	October 11, 1927	Killed in a motorcycle accident
Traffic Officer Leigh W. Metcalfe	Department of Highways	Hamilton, Ontario	October 17, 1927	Died in the hospital after a motorcycle accident
Constable Ernest Sargent	Vancouver Police Department	Vancouver, British Columbia	November 5, 1927	Shot in the stomach by a .38 calibre automatic pistol by well known criminal Leong Chung
Traffic Officer Hiram F. O'Callaghan	Department of Highways	Between Ottawa and Kemptville, Ontario	January 12, 1928	Killed in a motorcycle accident
Constable Norman F. Maker	Peterborough Police	Peterborough, Ontario	May 3, 1928	Shot and killed by David Montgomery point blank with a revolver. Montgomery was later killed by police.
Constable Albert E. Fisher	Toronto Police Service	Toronto, Ontario	November 11, 1928	Died in a motorcycle accident
Chief of Police Edward Lavery	Prescott Police	Brockville, Ontario	November 16, 1928	Lavery died in the hospital following a collision that occurred during a pursuit
Sergeant Richard Henry Nicholson	RCMP	near Molson, Manitoba	December 31, 1928	Killed by William Eppinger while investigating an illegal still operation
Traffic Officer Miles Campbell	Department of Highways	Gloucester, Ontario	June 9, 1929	Died after being struck by a vehicle during a traffic stop
Detective William Clark	Hamilton Police Service	Hamilton, Ontario	June 27, 1929	After a robbery, Charles L. Long holed himself up in the basement of a house armed with a shotgun after a foot pursuit with police. When tear gas and asphyxiating chemicals failed to push Long from his hiding place, Clark and another detective donned gas masks and entered the basement. A fight between Clark and Long ensued in which both were killed.
Constable Thomas I. Kehoe	Bancroft Police	Bancroft, Ontario	July 13, 1929	Died after being struck by a vehicle while on foot patrol
Traffic Officer Almer F.H. Wilson	Department of Highways	Windsor, Ontario	August 26, 1929	Died in the hospital after a motorcycle accident
Park Warden Percy Hamilton Goodair	Parks Canada Park Warden	Tonquin Valley, Jasper National Park, Alberta	September 12, 1929	Died in a Grizzly bear attack
Traffic Officer Fred Bingley	Department of Highways	near Caledonia, Ontario	October 4, 1929	Died in a motorcycle accident while on duty
Sergeant Thomas Kirk	York County Police	Near Thornhill, Ontario	April 17, 1930	Died in a car accident while on duty
Constable James Urquhart	Canadian Pacific Police Service	Vancouver, British Columbia	April 21, 1930	Hit by a freight train
Game Warden Dennis Greenwood	British Columbia Conservation Officer Service	Canal Flats, British Columbia	July 5, 1930	Shot and killed by William Floyd, after witnessing him poaching three deer
Constable James A. McNicoll	Crowland Township Police	Welland, Ontario	September 2, 1930	Shot and killed with a double-barreled shotgun in an ambush after responding to a call about a gun being fired
Constable Roy McQuillin	Toronto Police Service	York, Toronto, Ontario	December 11, 1930	Died after being shot by thieves in a stolen car. John Brockenshire was executed for the murder in 1931.
Constable Donald Ross Macdonell	RCMP	Roughly 12 km east of York Factory, Manitoba	April 19, 1931	Drowned in the Fourteen River while trying to swim to shore after having the ice thaw underneath their tent on the river during the warming spring
Special Constable Norman Massan	RCMP	Roughly 12 km east of York Factory, Manitoba	April 19, 1931	Drowned in the Fourteen River while trying to swim to shore after having the ice thaw underneath their tent on the river during the warming spring
Constable Blair C. Brown	Trenton Police	Between Trenton and Peterborough, Ontario	June 27, 1931	Killed in a car crash while on duty
Constable John F. Montgomery	Ontario Provincial Police (Westboro)	near Ottawa, Ontario	July 31, 1931	Killed in a car crash
Game Warden A. Harrison Eisenhauer	Nova Scotia Game Warden	Kearney Lake, Nova Scotia	December 2, 1931	Beaten to death by men while trying to make an arrest
Chief John W. Burdon	Strathroy Police	near Strathroy, Ontario	December 5, 1931	Died after missing a jump onto a moving truck
Constable Albert J. Nault	Sudbury Police	Sudbury, Ontario	December 21, 1931	Cst. Nault was shot and killed near the railway in a murder that was never solved
Constable Edgar Millen	RCMP	Eagle River, Yukon	January 30, 1932	Killed by Albert Johnson, also known as the Mad Trapper of Rat River
Constable Charles Hefferon	Ontario Provincial Police (Brampton)	Brampton, Ontario	May 12, 1932	Killed in a car collision
Corporal Leonard Victor Ralls	RCMP	Foam Lake, Saskatchewan	July 5, 1932	Killed while attempting to apprehend thieves
Constable Joseph Reilly	Vancouver Police Department	Vancouver, British Columbia	November 27, 1932	Struck and killed in his police car by another vehicle
Constable Joseph De Ferrari	Toronto Police Service	Toronto, Ontario	December 31, 1932	Died after being hit by a car while on his motorcycle
Inspector Lorne James Sampson	RCMP	Saskatoon, Saskatchewan	May 8, 1933	Died after falling of his horse while suppressing a riot
Inspector Joe Carruthers	Calgary Police Service	Calgary, Alberta	June 13, 1933	Shot in the chest after confronting a burglary suspect in an alley. No one has ever been charged for the killing.
Sergeant Joseph Blocksidge	Lethbridge Police Service	near Fort Macleod, Alberta	August 27, 1933	Killed in a car crash
Constable Joseph Farrell	Lethbridge Police Service	near Fort Macleod, Alberta	August 27, 1933	Killed in a car crash
Constable James Reid Mackie	Canadian Pacific Police Service	Lanoraie, Quebec	September 8, 1933	Mackie was shot five times by 28-year-old Paul Thouin while attempting to arrest him for breaking in to a rail car
Constable Joseph Lafleur	Sûreté du Québec (Traffic Service)	Montreal, Quebec	October 9, 1933	Died in a patrol motorcycle accident
Constable Russell Lemon	Ontario Provincial Police (Kitchener)	Toronto, Ontario	March 12, 1934	Struck by a vehicle
Constable Colin C. McGregor	St. Thomas Police	St. Thomas, Ontario	May 7, 1934	Shot while trying to arrest Frank Temple
Constable Daniel Miller	RCMP	Newcastle, New Brunswick	October 14, 1934	Died in a car accident
Constable Edward McMaster	Toronto Police Service	Toronto, Ontario	April 24, 1935	Died in the hospital after an collision with his motorcycle and a van
Corporal Michael Moriarty	RCMP (Lethbridge)	near Rosebud, Alberta	April 25, 1935	Murdered by a farmer, who later died after being pinned by a police car
Constable Edward Knox	Toronto Police Service	Toronto, Ontario	May 10, 1935	Drowned after driving off of the sea wall while patrolling at night during heavy fog
Constable William Wainwright	RCMP (Benito)	Benito, Manitoba	October 5, 1935	Killed by John Kalmakoff, Joseph Posnikoff, and Peter Woiken
Constable John G. Shaw	RCMP (Swan River)	Benito, Manitoba	October 5, 1935	Killed by John Kalmakoff, Joseph Posnikoff, and Peter Woiken
Constable George Campbell Harrison	RCMP (Banff)	Banff National Park East Gate, Alberta	October 8, 1935	Killed by John Kalmakoff, Joseph Posnikoff, and Peter Woiken
Sergeant Thomas Sellar Wallace	RCMP (Banff)	Banff National Park East Gate, Alberta	October 8, 1935	Killed by John Kalmakoff, Joseph Posnikoff, and Peter Woiken
Ranger Danny Corcoran	Newfoundland Rangers	near Harbour Deep, Dominion of Newfoundland (present-day Newfoundland and Labrador)	April 7, 1936	After going missing on his way to Harbour Deep, Ranger Corcoran broke through the ice, soaking his feet and freezing them. When he was discovered he had his feet amputated, from which he contacted tetanus. The tetanus anti-toxin failed to arrive before Corcoran died.
Constable George E.J. Lewis	Sarnia Police	Sarnia, Ontario	May 23, 1936	Shot and killed by armed robber Norman Ryan at a liquor store
Constable Orval E. Storey	Ontario Provincial Police (Owen Sound)	near Owen Sound, Ontario	July 25, 1936	Killed in a motorcycle collision
Constable Bernard Juneau	Sûreté du Québec (Traffic service)	Sherbrooke, Quebec	September 17, 1936	Died in a patrol motorcycle accident
Constable George Henry Howard	Canadian Pacific Police Service	Montreal, Quebec	December 23, 1936	Hit by a train while searching for a package
Constable Robert Mahlig	Canadian National Police Service	Ottawa, Ontario	January 6, 1937	Cst. Mahlig was punched in the head, fracturing his skull and killing him, while escorting a loiterer out of Union Station
J. Léopold Châteauneuf	Sûreté du Québec	Quebec City, Quebec	January 24, 1937	Shot and killed by a criminal
Constable George Edward Horan	RCMP	Near Deseronto, Ontario	March 10, 1937	Hit by a service oil truck in his police car and killed. The driver was fined $6.00
Constable William George Boorman	RCMP	Port Harrison, Quebec	May 26, 1937	Accidentally shot
Sergeant Frederick Davidson	Sudbury Police	Sudbury, Ontario	July 20, 1937	Died in the hospital nine days after being shot six times by duo Victor Gray and Tom Ponomanenko after trying to question them about switching license plates. Gray was later shot and killed by police, and Pononmanenko was hanged in 1938.
Constable Émile Perras	Sûreté du Québec	L'Assomption, Quebec	October 7, 1937	Died after being run over by a criminal while on his patrol motorcycle
Constable David D. Beckett	Windsor Police Service	Windsor, Ontario	November 3, 1937	Died after being run over by his police wagon when a vehicle that had run a red light ran into it
Constable Bartlett Smith	Ontario Provincial Police (Stamford Centre)	near St. David's, Ontario	December 22, 1937	Died in a motorcycle accident
Constable Robert D. Eddington	Ontario Provincial Police (Warren)	Sturgeon Falls, Ontario	January 21, 1938	Died in the hospital after being hit by a truck
Constable Donald C. Shervill	Ontario Provincial Police (Hamilton)	Hamilton, Ontario	February 13, 1938	Died from injuries received in a shooting seven days prior
Detective James Watson	Toronto Police Service	Toronto, Ontario	April 30, 1938	Died from injuries received in a car accident
Inspector William John Service	British Columbia Provincial Police	Prince Rupert, British Columbia	July 4, 1938	Shot twice and killed by Mike Gurvich while in the police office at the Prince Rupert courthouse.
Sergeant Robert Gibson	British Columbia Provincial Police	Prince Rupert, British Columbia	July 4, 1938	Shot twice and killed by Mike Gurvich while in the police office at the Prince Rupert courthouse.
Constable Elmer A. Shepard	Ontario Provincial Police (Kirkland Lake)	Between Matheson and Ramore, Ontario	July 24, 1938	Died in a car accident while on duty
Detective Sergeant Thomas A. Whitelaw	Toronto Police Service	Toronto, Ontario	November 17, 1938	Died from complications relating to an injury received during a foot chase
Corporal Michael Greene	Newfoundland Rangers	near Lamaline, Dominion of Newfoundland (present-day Newfoundland and Labrador)	March 1, 1936	Died when his horse fell through the ice
Constable Willis Edward Rhodeniser	RCMP	Carlyle, Saskatchewan	August 26, 1939	Killed while pursuing a murder suspect
Constable Frederick R.T. Blucher	Ontario Provincial Police (Port Credit)	Port Credit, Ontario	September 30, 1939	Killed in a motorcycle accident
Constable Norman Alfred Gleadow	RCMP	Esterhazy, Saskatchewan	October 11, 1939	Killed by 24-year-old Ernest Flook while trying to arrest him at his home for stealing multiple items from a store near Bredenbury. Flook then took Cst. Gleadow's police car and fled, later being cornered by an RCMP posse near Langenburg where he used Gleadow's revolver to kill himself
Sergeant Arthur Julian Barker	RCMP	Shaunavon, Saskatchewan	March 16, 1940	Shot and killed by his friend Victor Richard Greenlay, who was later diagnosed with Schizophrenia
Constable Frederick Gordon Frank Counsell	RCMP (Lethbridge)	Parkland, Alberta	May 22, 1940	Shot and killed by a man who was suspected in shooting his son.
Constable Harry G. Rapeer	RCMP	Regina, Saskatchewan	May 23, 1940	Died after being run over by a wagon while trying to calm the horses down
Constable Alfred J. Ferguson	Ontario Provincial Police (Rockland)	near Vankleek Hill, Ontario	May 23, 1940	Killed in a motorcycle accident
Constable Gérard Bouchard	Sûreté du Québec	Rimouski, Quebec	June 13, 1940	Killed in a patrol motorcycle accident
Constable Harold H. Dent	Ontario Provincial Police (Rockland)	Navan, Ontario	June 20, 1940	Shot and killed by Finnish transient John Miki
Constable Donald L. Pickell	Ontario Provincial Police (Mimico)	Queen Elizabeth Way, Ontario	July 2, 1940	Died in a motorcycle accident
Sub Inspector Gérard Bourgeault	Sûreté du Québec	Montreal, Quebec	September 11, 1940	Killed in a patrol motorcycle accident
Constable Roland W.J. Allen	Sûreté du Québec	Montreal, Quebec	December 1, 1940	Killed in a car accident while on duty
Constable Wilf Cox	Calgary Police Service	Calgary, Alberta	May 23, 1941	Motorcycle accident
Special Constable Henry Clare Jarvis	RCMP	Iroquois, Ontario	July 15, 1941	Drowned in the Cornwall Canal while on duty
Constable Ovila Roy	Sûreté du Québec	Lévis, Quebec	September 20, 1941	Died in a patrol motorcycle accident
County Constable Harry Fordham	Constable for Elgin County	near Fingal, Ontario	February 2, 1942	Struck and killed by a speeding vehicle
Constable Albert Joseph Chartrand	RCMP	Pasley Bay, N.W.T. (present-day Nunavut)	February 13, 1942	Died of a heart attack on board RCMPV St. Roch while it was stuck in ice
Constable John W. Scott	Toronto Police Service	Toronto, Ontario	August 12, 1942	Killed in a traffic accident while on duty
Constable John Moyes	Peterborough Police	Peterborough, Ontario	September 2, 1942	Died after being struck by a speeding vehicle
Customs Officer George A. Jackman	His Majesty's Customs Newfoundland	St. John's Harbour, Dominion of Newfoundland (present-day Newfoundland and Labrador)	January 18, 1943	Disappeared while searching for a Portuguese ship in St. John's Harbour
Chief Thomas Espy	Pembroke Police	near Petawawa, Ontario	September 16, 1943	Killed in a collision with a military convoy that had their lights blacked out
Constable Charles F. Hainer	Toronto Police Service	Toronto, Ontario	September 18, 1943	Killed in a motorcycle accident while on duty
Acting Sergeant Denis Michael Hector Collins	Canadian Forces Military Police	Mont-Joli, Quebec	December 19, 1943	Accidentally walked into a bomber's propeller
Constable George R. Vanderveer	Sarnia Police	Sarnia, Ontario	March 22, 1944	Died after being struck by a train while on his motorcycle pursuing a suspect
Lieutenant Howard Ross Bradford	Canadian Forces Military Police	Vernon, British Columbia	April 12, 1944	Died in a motorcycle accident while on duty
Constable John Teeves	Guelph Police Service	Guelph, Ontario	January 27, 1945	Cst. Teeves died from injuries he received after being hit by a drunk driver while directing traffic
Constable Robert W. Duncan	Ontario Provincial Police (Bowmanville)	near Port Hope, Ontario	February 21, 1945	Died after falling from a train in uncertain circumstances
Patrolman Henry Raymond Craig	Canadian Forces Military Police	Halifax, Nova Scotia	July 18, 1945	Died in an explosion at the Bedford Magazine
Detective Thomas Stoneman	Ottawa Police Service	Ottawa, Ontario	October 29, 1945	Stoneman was killed by three youths while attempting to locate a stolen vehicle. The vehicle had been used in theft of weapons from the Canadian War Museum. Stoneman and a fellow officer approached three youths who were suspected of having just broken into cars. One of the youths shot Detective Stoneman using a gun stolen from the museum.
Constable Robert A. Wright	Toronto Police Service	Toronto, Ontario	December 22, 1945	Struck by a vehicle and killed while directing traffic
Constable Charlemange Bouchard	Sûreté du Québec	Quebec City, Quebec	July 24, 1946	Killed in a patrol motorcycle accident involving another car
Ranger Michael Collins	Newfoundland Rangers	Stephenville, Dominion of Newfoundland (present-day Newfoundland and Labrador)	August 8, 1946	Died from injuries received in a motorcycle accident
Constable Wilfred James Cobble	RCMP	Lavoy, Alberta	December 4, 1946	Died after being struck by a truck while on duty
Constable Charles Boyes	Vancouver Police Department	Vancouver, British Columbia	February 26, 1947	Killed during a bank robbery
Constable Oliver Ledingham	Vancouver Police Department	Vancouver, British Columbia	February 26, 1947	Killed during a bank robbery
Constable Francis A. Graham	Windsor Police Service	near Windsor, Ontario	September 26, 1947	Died in a car crash while on duty
Constable Douglas Reynolds	Chatham Police	Chatham, Ontario	December 30, 1947	Struck his head on the concrete and died during an altercation with a person, who was later convicted of manslaughter
Constable Merritt C. Gray	Kingston Police Force	Kingston, Ontario	April 29, 1948	Died in a motorcycle crash while on duty
Constable George Yuile	Ontario Provincial Police (Brampton)	Brampton, Ontario	June 11, 1948	Died in a car crash while on duty
Constable James Boyd Henderson	RCMP (Kingston)	Gananoque, Ontario	August 7, 1948	Drowned in the St. Lawrence River
Constable Carl F. Wilson	RCMP (Truro)	Portapique, Nova Scotia	September 9, 1948	Struck by an automobile while directing traffic
Constable Reginald G. Morden	Ontario Provincial Police (Little Currents)	near Little Currents, Ontario	May 17, 1949	Died in a car collision while on duty
Constable Edward Terrell	Sudbury Police	Sudbury, Ontario	June 18, 1949	Shot through the heart and killed while approaching a house where a call for assistance was made
Constable Gerry Dault	Sudbury Police	Sudbury, Ontario	June 18, 1949	Shot in the head and killed while leaving cover to move a crowd back during a standoff with Clarence Brosseau, after he had just killed Cst. Terrell

=== 1950–1999 ===
1950–1999

Name and rank	Agency	Location	Date	Details
Constable Alexander Gamman	RCMP	Montreal, Quebec	May 26, 1950	Killed while trying to apprehend a bank robber
Constable Frank Hare	Port Dover Police	Port Dover, Ontario	June 2, 1951	Died after his police truck was struck by a train
Sergeant Robert J. Battersby	Toronto Police Service	Toronto, Ontario	June 22, 1951	Fatally electrocuted
County Constable Mont Alexander Wood	Lennox & Addington Police	Northbrook, Ontario	December 1, 1951	Struck by a car and killed while on duty
Sergeant of Detectives Edmond Tong	Toronto Police Service	Toronto, Ontario	May 23, 1952	Killed by two bank robbers while pulling them over
Constable Stephen Kasper	RCMP	Prince Rupert, British Columbia	May 11, 1953	Died in a plane crash while on duty
Corporal Harold T. Shaughnessy	Ontario Provincial Police (Port Colborne)	Welland, Ontario	September 19, 1953	Died in the hospital after a car accident while on duty
Customs Inspector Percy New	Canada Border Services Agency	Ambassador Bridge, Windsor, Ontario	January 20, 1954	Struck by a truck and killed
Corporal Henry Gilchrist	Ontario Provincial Police (Tillsonburg)	Highway 3 between Tillsonburg and Aylmer, Ontario	February 17, 1954	Died in a car accident while on duty
Constable Kenneth Lennon	Etobicoke Township Police	Etobicoke, Ontario	June 19, 1954	Died in a motorcycle accident while on patrol
Constable Joseph Kasimir Sander	RCMP	Near Swan River, Manitoba	July 9, 1954	Drowned while on patrol
Constable Ronald Charles Bloomfield	RCMP	Near Swan River, Manitoba	July 9, 1954	Drowned while on patrol
Constable Robert Lévesque	Sûreté du Québec	Rivière-du-Loup, Quebec	August 23, 1954	Died after being hit by a car while at the scene of a car crash
Constable Douglas Earl Ferguson	RCMP	Cape Alexander, N.W.T. (Northwest Territories) (present-day Nunavut)	September 17, 1954	Died of carbon monoxide poisoning while onboard RCMPV Kingalik
Constable Fabien Galipeault	Sûreté du Québec	L'Assomption, Quebec	October 19, 1954	Hit and killed by a vehicle while directing traffic
Constable George Constantineau	Ottawa Police Service	Ottawa, Ontario	November 17, 1954	Died in a motorcycle accident while on duty
Constable Ernest Paul	Copper Cliff Police	Copper Cliff, Ontario	May 28, 1955	Shot and killed by a deranged man in a hotel while talking to a cook
Constable Florian Poirier	Sûreté du Québec	Quebec City, Quebec	July 29, 1955	Killed in a patrol motorcycle accident
Constable Roy Eldon Laird	RCMP	near Medicine Hat, Alberta	August 26, 1955	Died in a car wreck while on duty
Constable Charles William Reay	RCMP	Island Falls, Saskatchewan	October 6, 1955	Drowned in the Churchill River
Conservation Officer Lee Branscombe	Ministry of Natural Resources	Collin's Inlet, Ontario	November 10, 1955	Drowned after last being seen leaving the former settlement of Collin's Inlet on a motorboat.
Deputy Warden Arthur "Art" Noble	Ministry of Natural Resources	Collin's Inlet, Ontario	November 10, 1955	Drowned after last being seen leaving the former settlement of Collin's Inlet on a motorboat.
Constable Gordon Sinclair	Vancouver Police Department	Vancouver, British Columbia	December 7, 1955	Shot and killed while investigating two suspicious men. One of his killers was hanged and the other was given life in prison.
Inspector David James McCombe	RCMP	near Cut Knife, Saskatchewan	December 12, 1955	Died from the elements while on patrol
Constable William Lawrence Melsom	RCMP	Port Alberni, British Columbia	February 8, 1956	Killed in a traffic collision while responding to a call
Constable John A.C. Behan	Ontario Provincial Police (Perth)	Highway 7 between Maberly and Silver Lake, Ontario	April 14, 1956	Died in a car accident while on duty
Constable Henry Charles Allington Chandler	RCMP	Millview, Nova Scotia	June 15, 1956	Died in a traffic accident
Police Captain Ernest Chalifoux	Sûreté du Québec (Sainte-Agathe-des-Monts)	Sainte-Agathe-des-Monts, Quebec	August 7, 1956	Shot and killed while attempting to arrest two thieves during a power outage
Constable Lewis R. Durant	Markham Township Police	Markham, Ontario	August 18, 1956	Struck and killed by a motorist during a traffic stop
Constable John Roland Cobley	RCMP	near Salmon Arm, British Columbia	January 5, 1957	Died from injuries received after being hit by a car while on duty
Sergeant Claire J. McGillen	Peterborough Police	Peterborough, Ontario	May 23, 1957	Died in a car accident while on duty
Constable Philip de la Rue	Ontario Provincial Police (Matheson)	Matheson, Ontario	May 25, 1957	Died in the hospital after a car crash while on duty
Constable Peter R. Sebborn	Ontario Provincial Police (Kenora)	Kenora, Ontario	June 1, 1957	Died in the hospital after a car collision while on duty
Constable Henry J. Harper	Ontario Provincial Police (Gananoque)	Kingston, Ontario	September 11, 1957	Died in hospital after being struck by a vehicle in the rain
Constable Samuel Jeffers	Royal Newfoundland Constabulary	St. John's, Newfoundland and Labrador	September 18, 1957	Died in a motorcycle accident
Constable Ronald Pitt	Morrisburg Police	Montreal, Quebec	September 23, 1957	Died in the hospital in Quebec after being shot while apprehending occupants of a stolen vehicle in Morrisburg
Constable Ken Delmage	Calgary Police Service	Calgary, Alberta	November 4, 1957	Died in a motorcycle accident
Constable George W. Smith	Windsor Police Service	London, Ontario	December 12, 1957	Died in the hospital after a collision during a snow storm
Corporal Herbert Milton Smart	RCMP	near Georgina Island in Lake Simcoe, Ontario	June 7, 1958	Drowned when their boat was swamped during a storm
Constable Maurice Melnychuk	RCMP	near Georgina Island in Lake Simcoe, Ontario	June 7, 1958	Drowned when their boat was swamped during a storm
Constable Glen Frederick Farough	RCMP	near Georgina Island in Lake Simcoe, Ontario	June 7, 1958	Drowned when their boat was swamped during a storm
Constable David Melvyn Perry	RCMP	near Georgina Island in Lake Simcoe, Ontario	June 7, 1958	Drowned when their boat was swamped during a storm
Constable George Herbert Edward Ransom	RCMP	near Georgina Island in Lake Simcoe, Ontario	June 7, 1958	Drowned when their boat was swamped during a storm
Constable Carl Lennart Sundell	RCMP	Herschel Island, Yukon	July 14, 1958	Accidentally shot
Staff Sergeant Stanley Samuel Rothwell	RCMP	Skaha Lake, British Columbia	August 6, 1958	Killed in a plane accident
Constable Richard William Green	RCMP	Skaha Lake, British Columbia	August 6, 1958	Killed in a plane accident
Special Constable Joseph Edouard Raymond Cormier	RCMP	Skaha Lake, British Columbia	August 6, 1958	Killed in a plane accident
Investigator Jean-Davila Lévesque	Sûreté du Québec	Lambton, Quebec	September 23, 1958	Shot and killed while pursuing a criminal
Constable Willis J. Jacob	Ontario Provincial Police (Barrie)	Highway 11 between Barrie and Orillia, Ontario	October 3, 1958	Killed when the police car he was in was struck by a car driving the wrong way with no headlights on
Constable Roger Beaupré	Sûreté du Québec (Sept-Îles)	Sept-Îles, Quebec	November 10, 1958	Died in a traffic accident
Constable Calvin R. Fulford	Ontario Provincial Police (Ear Falls)	Ear Falls, Ontario	December 25, 1958	Killed by Thomas Young (mass murderer) alongside 4 others. Young was hanged in 1959.
Constable Joseph Thor Thompson	RCMP	Selkirk, Manitoba	February 18, 1959	Died in Selkirk from injuries received two years prior when his police transport vehicle was struck by the landing gear of a plane at Lethbridge Airport
Constable William Moss	Royal Newfoundland Constabulary	Badger, Newfoundland and Labrador	March 10, 1959	Hit in the head with a pulp log on March 8 while clashing with striking loggers. Died two days later in the hospital.
Constable John B. Perkins	Toronto Police Service	Toronto, Ontario	July 7, 1959	Died in a motorcycle accident while on duty
Conservation Officer Harold Thompson	Saskatchewan Department of Natural Resources	Peter Pond Lake, Saskatchewan	August 20, 1959	Disappeared while on board a Cessna 180 from Buffalo Narrows to La Loche. Aircraft was recovered in 2019 after extensive search using sonar.
Constable John Terrence Hoey	RCMP	Botwood, Newfoundland and Labrador	November 7, 1959	Shot and killed while investigating a complaint
Forest Ranger J. Leslie Greer	New Brunswick Department of Natural Resources	near Welsford, New Brunswick	November 27, 1959	Drowned alongside another man while trying to rescue two stranded soldiers from nearby CFB Gagetown during a storm.
Constable Colin Eric Lelliott	RCMP	Cambridge Bay, N.W.T. (Northwest Territories) (present-day Nunavut)	January 12, 1960	Shot and killed while attempting an arrest
Émilia Nadeau Samson Morel	Sûreté du Québec (Peace officer)	near Chibougamau, Quebec	July 25, 1960	Died in a car accident
Constable Edward R. Wickens	Ontario Provincial Police (Orillia)	near Washago, Ontario	May 10, 1960	Died after his vehicle was hit by a truck while on duty
Constable Jean-Marc Godmer	Sûreté du Québec	Laurentian Mountains near Mont-Tremblant, Quebec	September 22, 1960	Died in a plane crash
Sergeant Lucien Danis	Sûreté du Québec	Laurentian Mountains near Mont-Tremblant, Quebec	September 22, 1960	Died in a plane crash
Constable Theodore D. Christiansen	Toronto Police Service	Toronto, Ontario	March 25, 1961	Died in a motorcycle accident while on duty
Constable Ronald Arthur Ekstrom	RCMP	near Lytton, British Columbia	April 22, 1961	Died in a car accident
Agent Gérard Richard	Sûreté du Québec	Nicolet, Quebec	August 12, 1961	Hit by a motorist during a traffic stop. Died in the hospital the following day
Constable Wayne Sinclair	RCMP	near Regina, Saskatchewan	September 17, 1961	Died from injuries received in a traffic accident
Agent Frédeau Simard	Sûreté du Québec (Portneuf)	Saint-Léonard-de-Portneuf, Quebec	October 16, 1961	Died in a vehicle accident during a car chase
Detective Roger Robidoux	Sûreté du Québec	Montreal, Quebec	January 9, 1962	Fatally shot
Constable Dennis Winstanley	Stamford Township Police	Stamford Township, Ontario	February 3, 1962	Killed by a drunk driver while on duty
Constable Frederick Nash	Toronto Police Service	Toronto, Ontario	February 12, 1962	Cst. Nash was killed by a suspect wanted for armed robbery at a traffic stop. Despite being shot four times, Nash managed to withdraw his service revolver and fire back at the suspect hitting him twice. Cst. Nash later died in the hospital. Nash's killer, Ronald Turpin, became one of the last two men to be executed in Canada.
Constable Elwood Joseph Keck	RCMP	Knutsford, British Columbia	June 18, 1962	Killed by 31-year-old George Booth while investigating a complaint
Constable Gordon Eric Pedersen	RCMP	Knutsford, British Columbia	June 18, 1962	Killed by 31-year-old George Booth while investigating a complaint
Constable Donald George Weisgerber	RCMP	Knutsford, British Columbia	June 18, 1962	Killed by 31-year-old George Booth while investigating a complaint
Constable Archille Octave Maxime Lepine	RCMP	near Cloverdale, British Columbia	July 19, 1962	Died from injuries received in a car accident that occurred while on duty
Constable David R. Gregory	Hamilton Police Service	Hamilton, Ontario	August 29, 1962	Shot and killed by Bruce Griffet with a 16 gauge shotgun. Griffet was then shot and wounded by former police officer George Brewster using Cst. Gregory's weapon, leading to Griffet killing himself with the shotgun. The day prior to this incident Griffet, who was previously institutionalized, bludgeoned his mother and neighbour to death.
Constable Marcel Roch	Joliette Police	Joliette, Quebec	September 1, 1962	Cst. Roch died in hospital from wounds he received after being shot by Jacques Poirier, who had ambushed him and other police at a hardware store.
Constable Thomas J. Black	Woodstock Police	Woodstock, Ontario	October 17, 1962	Shot and killed while trying to apprehend to escaped patients from a hospital
Constable Claude Marineau	St-Laurent Police	Montreal, Quebec	December 14, 1962	Killed by 34-year-old bank robber Georges Marcotte using a semi-automatic rifle. Originally given the death penalty, capital punishment was abolished in Canada in 1976 and so he was given a life sentence instead and was later paroled in 1981.
Constable Denis Brabant	St-Laurent Police	Montreal, Quebec	December 14, 1962	Killed by 34-year-old bank robber Georges Marcotte using a semi-automatic rifle. Originally given the death penalty, capital punishment was abolished in Canada in 1976 and so he was given a life sentence instead and was later paroled in 1981.
Constable Marius Trépanier	Sûreté du Québec (Rimouski)	Rimouski, Quebec	December 18, 1962	Killed while sitting in his patrol car, after being intentionally hit by a truck, driven with the headlights off by two suspects who were aware that the police were about to arrest them.
Constable James Walter Foreman	RCMP	Sangudo, Alberta	April 24, 1963	Died from injuries received after being struck by a vehicle while helping a stranded motorist
Constable Philippe Mailhot	Sûreté du Québec	Montreal, Quebec	May 10, 1963	Killed in a car collision with a pole while on duty
Constable Jeffrey Armstrong	Ottawa Police Service	Ottawa, Ontario	May 13, 1963	Killed in a friendly fire incident
Sergeant Kenneth Morley Laughland	RCMP (Whitehorse)	Carmacks, Yukon	July 13, 1963	Killed after an RCMP floatplane crashed while attempting to land on the Yukon River. The plane was transporting a prisoner back to jail in Whitehorse after he testified in a trial in Mayo. All 4 Mounties and the 1 prisoner on the plane died.
Corporal Robert William Asbil	RCMP (Whitehorse)	Carmacks, Yukon	July 13, 1963	Killed after an RCMP floatplane crashed while attempting to land on the Yukon River. The plane was transporting a prisoner back to jail in Whitehorse after he testified in a trial in Mayo. All 4 Mounties and the 1 prisoner on the plane died.
Constable Proctor Laurence Anthony Malcolm	RCMP (Whitehorse)	Carmacks, Yukon	July 13, 1963	Killed after an RCMP floatplane crashed while attempting to land on the Yukon River. The plane was transporting a prisoner back to jail in Whitehorse after he testified in a trial in Mayo. All 4 Mounties and the 1 prisoner on the plane died.
Constable William John David Annand	RCMP (Whitehorse)	Carmacks, Yukon	July 13, 1963	Killed after an RCMP floatplane crashed while attempting to land on the Yukon River. The plane was transporting a prisoner back to jail in Whitehorse after he testified in a trial in Mayo. All 4 Mounties and the 1 prisoner on the plane died.
Constable Arthur T. Truman	Toronto Police Service	Toronto, Ontario	August 3, 1963	Killed in a car accident while on duty
Constable Patrick C. Armstrong	Ontario Provincial Police (Powassan)	near Callander, Ontario	September 11, 1963	Killed in a car accident while on duty
Reserve Inspector Arthur Trentham	Vancouver Police Department	Vancouver, British Columbia	September 16, 1963	Died after being struck by a vehicle in a hit and run
Constable Émile Lachance	Sûreté du Québec	Boischatel, Quebec	October 3, 1963	Killed in a car crash
Constable Roy Gilbert Jennex	Halifax Regional Police	Halifax, Nova Scotia	November 29, 1963	Ran over by a vehicle while directing traffic
Detective Kenneth J. Evans	Toronto Police Service	Sainte-Thérèse, Quebec	November 30, 1963	Evans and Bassett were two of the 118 people killed on board Trans-Canada Air Lines Flight 831 after takeoff. They were returning to Toronto after testifying in a murder trial in Quebec
Detective Sergeant John H. Bassett	Toronto Police Service	Sainte-Thérèse, Quebec	November 30, 1963	Evans and Bassett were two of the 118 people killed on board Trans-Canada Air Lines Flight 831 after takeoff. They were returning to Toronto after testifying in a murder trial in Quebec
Constable Joseph Pierre Francois Dubois	RCMP	West of New Carlisle, Quebec	January 3, 1964	Died in a car accident while on duty. The cause of the crash was never determined.
Constable Walter E. MacAulay	Guelph Police Service	Guelph, Ontario	April 5, 1964	Cst. MacAulay died after being dragged from the vehicle of a motorist while trying to arrest them. MacAulay was in plainclothes with his 5-year-old daughter when he went to assist a fellow police officer in the arrest.
Constable Calvin Lamonte Byam	Lethbridge Police Service	Lethbridge, Alberta	June 10, 1964	Swept away and drowned during a flood while trying to help people living on an island in the Oldman River
Corporal Ervin Jack Giesbrecht	RCMP	Grand Rapids, Manitoba	June 20, 1964	Drowned when his police car lost control and plunged in the Saskatchewan River
Constable Alexander M. Prodan	Ontario Provincial Police (Dutton)	Rural Elgin County, Ontario	August 30, 1964	Died after his car caught fire when it was struck by a vehicle while he was chasing a speeding motorist
Corporal David Chénard	Sûreté du Québec	Trois-Pistoles, Quebec	October 31, 1964	Shot and killed by a mentally ill person
Conservation Officer William Munro	Ontario Ministry of Natural Resources	near Winchester, Ontario	December 15, 1964	Killed in a vehicle collision with a dump truck
Constable Robert Weston Amey	RCMP	Whitbourne, Newfoundland and Labrador	December 17, 1964	Shot and killed by an escaping prisoner at the St. John's Penitentiary
Constable Reginald W. Williams	RCMP	Sooke, British Columbia	December 19, 1964	Drowned when his police car slid on the icy road and plunged into the ocean.
Constable Neil McArthur Bruce	RCMP	Kelowna, British Columbia	April 14, 1965	Died in the hospital from complications from a bullet wound he received while investigating a complaint in Westbank.
Conservation Officer Robert Guenther	Ontario Department of Lands and Forests	Luther Marsh near Grand Valley, Ontario	October 1, 1965	Accidentally drowned while trying to save his colleague, C.O. Liddle
Conservation Officer Carl Liddle	Ontario Department of Lands and Forests	Luther Marsh near Grand Valley, Ontario	October 1, 1965	Accidentally drowned
Sergeant Laurier C. Quesnel	Sudbury Police	Sudbury, Ontario	October 14, 1965	Shot through the door and killed by Lionel E. Proulx, who they were trying to return to a mental hospital. Proulx was later found to have killed himself.
Guy Renaud	Sûreté du Québec	Between Val d'Or and Louvicourt, Quebec	October 25, 1965	Died in a car accident
Georges Hélie	Sûreté du Québec	Saint-Hubert, Quebec	November 6, 1965	Died in a car accident
Conservation Officer Alfred Newland	Saskatchewan Department of Natural Resources	Cut Beaver Lake near Cumberland House, Saskatchewan	November 19, 1965	Accidentally shot by a hunter after being mistaken for game
Constable Ronald F. Webster	Toronto Township Police	Toronto Township, Ontario	January 18, 1966	Died in a car accident
Constable Thomas Percy Carroll	RCMP	Cyril Lake, 44 km SW of Gillam, Manitoba	February 11, 1966	Died in a plane crash while on duty
Conservation Officer Charles Morrish	Manitoba Department of Lands and Forests	Reader Lake near The Pas, Manitoba	April 3, 1966	Drowned when he fell through ice
Constable John R. Maki	Ontario Provincial Police (Rockcliffe)	Ottawa, Ontario	April 4, 1966	Shot and killed with his service weapon by a mental patient he had just admitted to a psychiatric hospital
Constable Philip John Francis Tidman	RCMP	near Wakaw, Saskatchewan	April 20, 1966	Killed in a police car accident
Constable Edward Holdsworth	Whitchurch Township Police	Toronto, Ontario	May 15, 1966	Died from electrocution
Constable Larry Esau	Vancouver Police Department	Vancouver, British Columbia	June 29, 1966	Died in a motorcycle collision
Constable Thomas J. Emery	Ontario Provincial Police (Downsview)	Toronto, Ontario	July 25, 1966	Died in a motorcycle accident
Special Constable Claude Guay	Sûreté du Québec	Hébertville, Quebec	September 8, 1966	Struck by a train and killed
Constable Roger Beausoleil	Willow Bunch Police	Willow Bunch, Saskatchewan	October 20, 1966	Cst. Beausoleil was shot and killed by Archie Larocque after being called to a domestic dispute at the house
Constable Gordon Donald Pearson	RCMP	Winterburn, Alberta	November 22, 1966	Cst. Pearson was investigating a disturbance in a restaurant when 26-year-old Charles Wilfred Hill entered with a .303 rifle and shot Cst. Pearson and two other men. A bystander tried to speed Pearson to the hospital but he was dead on arrival. The two other men were in critical condition but both recovered. Hill was originally going to be hanged, but appealed and received life in prison instead.
Conservation Officer William Macleod	Manitoba Department of Lands and Forests	Cormorant, Manitoba	May 12, 1967	C.O. Macleod was approached at his house by the trapper Isaiah Constant, who demanded a trapline to be assigned to him. When Macleod refused to give him one, Constant shot him in the knee with a shotgun. Macleod died of complications from this injury four years later.
Constable Terry Eugene Tomfohr	RCMP	Burnaby, British Columbia	June 3, 1967	Died after falling into a ravine while investigating a complaint late at night in the woods
Corporal Donald Archibald Harvey	RCMP	Grande Prairie, Alberta	June 23, 1967	While investigating the murder of Georgine Roberst, Harvey and his partner were ambushed, and Harvey was fatally shot.
Chief of Police Donald Martin	Acton Vale Police	Acton Vale, Quebec	June 29, 1967	Shot and killed while trying to arrest a robber. Martin also shot the robber who later died as well.
Constable Yves St-Germain	Repentigny Police	Repentigny, Quebec	July 26, 1967	Died in a fire at the Repentigny Art Center that also killed a 68-year-old caretaker
Constable Roger St-Jean	Repentigny Police	Repentigny, Quebec	July 29, 1967	Died in a fire at the Repentigny Art Center that also killed a 68-year-old caretaker
Constable Robert William Varney	RCMP	near Raymond, Alberta	August 17, 1967	Killed a car accident involving his police car
Constable James I. Hamilton	Ontario Provincial Police (Listowel)	near Listowel, Ontario	August 19, 1967	Shot and killed on a mennonite farm alongside retired Listowel Chief of Police Cully Rocher while pulling up to investigate a domestic incident. The suspect was found to have taken his own life afterwards.
Game Warden Austin W.L. Letcher Sr.	Nova Scotia Department Lands and Forests	Port Hastings, Nova Scotia	October 8, 1967	After leaving to investigate reports of gunshots in the River Denys area, Ward Letcher would not return home. The next day he was found unconscious in his overturned vehicle, and would later succumb to his injuries. An investigation lead to the conclusion of foul play, however no arrests were ever made in the case.
Conservation Officer Al Comfort	Ontario Department of Lands and Forests	Shipsands Island near Moose Factory, Ontario	October 11, 1967	After beaching his canoe on Shipsands Island, the fast-moving currents of the Moose River swept the boat out to sea. C.O. Comfort swam after it until the boat was out of reach, eventually swimming back to the island where, wet and cold, he succumbed to hypothermia.
Detective Charles Jeary	Greenfield Park Police	Greenfield Park, Quebec	January 25, 1968	On January 5, Detective Jeary was inside the Bank of Montreal in Greenfield Park when four hooded men walked in. Producing his service revolver, he told the men to drop their weapons before they opened fire at him with their machine guns. Jeary was hit twice, one blowing off the top of his thumb before entering his side and the other puncturing his liver and lung. Despite this, Jeary managed to return fire, hitting two of the men. One of the men was dragged away to the escape vehicle while the other was kept in a headlock by Jeary until reinforcements arrived. Operations at the hospital to stop Jeary's internal bleeding proved unsuccessful and he died 20 days after the incident. Of the four men, three were captured; Gilles Parent, Gilles Bienvenue, and André Ouellette. Only Parent was convicted in Jeary's murder.
Constable Ghyslain Martineau	Sûreté du Québec	Fitch Bay, Quebec	March 9, 1968	Cst. Martineau collided head first with a van, killing him instantly. Two others were also killed in the crash
Detective Sergeant Gilles Jean	Montreal Police	Montreal, Quebec	May 8, 1968	Det. Sgt. Jean and his partner entered an apartment following a tip that escaped fugitive Yves Simard was hiding there. When inside, Jean was shot multiple times in the chest by Simard and killed. Simard then turned the gun on himself.
Constable Gerald F. Mills	Whitechurch Township Police	Vandorf, Ontario	May 29, 1968	Struck by a vehicle while on duty
Constable Gérard Deschamps	Repentigny Police	Repentigny, Quebec	June 9, 1968	Killed in a motor vehicle accident
Constable Peter Kirk	Ontario Provincial Police (Hawkesbury)	Between L'Orignal and Alfred, Ontario	June 9. 1968	Killed in a motor vehicle accident
Constable Samuel E. Ankenmann	Ontario Provincial Police (Sebringville)	North Easthope Township, Ontario	June 29, 1968	Killed in a motor vehicle accident
Constable André Duhaime	Sûreté du Québec	Cap-de-la-Madeleine, Quebec	July 1, 1968	Killed in a motor vehicle accident
Constable Bradford Browne	Ontario Provincial Police (Sudbury)	near Sudbury, Ontario	November 13, 1968	Killed in a motor vehicle accident
Constable Alain Falardeau	Sûreté du Québec	Champlain, Quebec	November 27, 1968	Killed in a motor vehicle accident
Constable James Alexander Kerr	RCMP	near Fredericton, New Brunswick	December 11, 1968	Died in a car accident
Constable James Smith	Ontario Provincial Police (Peterborough)	Snowdon Township, Ontario	December 11, 1968	Killed while trying to negotiate with a man who was holding his mother hostage
Detective Sergeant Lorne J. Chapitis	Ontario Provincial Police (Peterborough)	Snowdon Township, Ontario	December 11, 1968	Killed while trying to negotiate with a man who was holding his mother hostage
Sergeant John C. McMurich	Hamilton Police Service	Hamilton, Ontario	December 22, 1968	Beaten and shot with his own gun by a group of 20 people while staking out a house
Constable Stan Christie	Pointe Claire Police	Pointe-Claire, Quebec	December 22, 1968	Killed in a motor vehicle accident
Constable Helgi Sigurdur Tomasson	RCMP	near Sheho, Saskatchewan	April 18, 1969	Died in a car accident involving a tractor
Constable Gilles Boutin	SPVM	Montreal, Quebec	May 12, 1969	Killed in an intentional vehicle strike
Corporal Terry Gerrard Williams	RCMP	near Sheet Harbour, Nova Scotia	June 8, 1969	Drowned in a boat accident
Constable Leonard Shakespeare	St. Boniface Police	St. Boniface, Manitoba	July 18, 1969	Shot and killed by Clifford Wicket Lurvey while responding to a burglary call.
Constable Robert Carrick	Sandwich West Township Police	LaSalle, Ontario	August 23, 1969	Shot and killed by William Rosik while responding to a domestic complaint
Constable David Goldsworthy	Toronto Police Service	Toronto, Ontario	October 5, 1969	Killed by Vincenzo Fazzri using a snub-nosed revolver. His body was found the following day in a field.
Corporal Robert Dumas	Sûreté du Québec	Montreal, Quebec	October 7, 1969	Killed during the Murray-Hill riot
Assistant Forestry Ranger Silas Baikie	Newfoundland Department of Natural Resources	Newfoundland and Labrador	December 16, 1969	Drowned after his boat was swamped during a patrol. The other ranger on the boat was found by an RCMP search plane five days later.
Constable William R. Rodgers	Ontario Provincial Police (Petrolia)	near Strathroy, Ontario	February 25, 1970	While investigating an accident on Ontario Highway 22 during a snowstorm, Cst. Rodgers and two good samaritans were struck and killed by a vehicle.
Detective Ronald Houston	Winnipeg Police Service	Winnipeg, Manitoba	June 26, 1970	Stabbed with a knife and then shot with his own service revolver by Thomas Mason Shand during a struggle that also wounded Dtv. John DeGroot. Shand was believed to have been the perpetrator of a series of rapes in the Fort Rouge area of Winnipeg and was caught peeping through a window by the two policemen when the fight occurred.
Constable Stefan H. Schultz	Ontario Provincial Police (Brantford)	near Hagersville, Ontario	July 19, 1970	Cst. Schultz and four others were killed and Cst. Hardman was injured when they were struck by a vehicle in a hit-and-run. Cst. Schultz and Cst. Hardman were investigating a liquor offence relating to a group of five people drinking on the side of Brant County Road 20 when the car travelling east hit the seven people on the road at the time, before fleeing. Cst. Hardman lost a leg in the accident and spent nine months in the hospital. The driver of the vehicle was charged $100 and had his license suspended for six months.
Constable William Joseph Green	RCMP	Invermere, British Columbia	October 4, 1970	Killed in a vehicle accident
Sergeant Robert J. Schrader	RCMP	MacDowall, Saskatchewan	October 9, 1970	Shot and killed by Stanley Wilfred Robertson while investigating a family dispute. Robertson eluded capture and led police and the armed forces on a manhunt until he was found dead in May 1971.
Constable Douglas Bernard Anson	RCMP	MacDowall, Saskatchewan	October 9, 1970	Shot and killed by Stanley Wilfred Robertson while investigating a family dispute. Robertson eluded capture and led police and the armed forces on a manhunt until he was found dead in May 1971.
Sergeant James O'Malley	RCMP	near Gillam, Manitoba	October 28, 1970	Drowned
Constable Derek Ivany	RCMP	near St. Arthur, New Brunswick	June 25, 1971	Died in car accident
Constable Harold Stanley Seigel	RCMP	Île-des-Chênes, Manitoba	September 26, 1971	Shot by Jean Charles D'Auteuil during a siege at a bungalow. Died while on the way to the hospital.
Constable John Verral	Ontario Provincial Police (Oakville)	Oakville, Ontario	October 8, 1971	Died in a motorcycle accident
Constable Gabriel Labelle	Ste-Thérèse Police	Sainte-Thérèse, Quebec	October 12, 1971	Killed by Real Chartrand using a submachine gun following Chartrand's escape from an asylum in Montreal.
Constable Bernard Charlebois	SPVM	Montreal, Quebec	November 5, 1971	Killed by a burglar
Constable Michael Mason	RCMP	Courtenay, British Columbia	November 26, 1971	Killed in a plane crash
Constable Jean Sabourin	SPVM	Montreal, Quebec	December 16, 1971	Shot and killed by a group of masked men who had just robbed store, while he was writing a ticket for another person.
Constable Fernand Bertrand	Hull Police	Hull, Quebec	January 8, 1972	Shot and killed while transporting an individual.
Constable Donald Lewis	Toronto Police Service	Toronto, Ontario	February 11, 1972	Killed in vehicle accident
Detective Michael Irwin	Toronto Police Service	Toronto, Ontario	February 27, 1972	While responding to a person with an extensive criminal history who was facing eviction, Dtv. Irwin and Dtv. Sinclair were shot and killed by the suspect while entering his apartment.
Detective Douglas Sinclair	Toronto Police Service	Toronto, Ontario	February 27, 1972	While responding to a person with an extensive criminal history who was facing eviction, Dtv. Irwin and Dtv. Sinclair were shot and killed by the suspect while entering his apartment.
Constable Leslie Gardner	Moose Jaw Police	Moose Jaw, Saskatchewan	May 5, 1972	Died after his police cruiser was struck by a drunk driver
Constable Clare Lackey	Ontario Provincial Police (Little Current)	Ontario Highway 540, Manitoulin Island, Ontario	July 16, 1972	Struck head on by a drunk driver while returning from a domestic dispute call. Cst. Lackey and the impaired driver were both killed while his partner survived with injuries.
Constable James Lothian	Toronto Police Service	Toronto, Ontario	January 10, 1973	Shot and killed by a driver during a police pursuit.
Constable Leslie Maitland	Toronto Police Service	Toronto, Ontario	February 1, 1973	Shot and killed by Rene Vaillancourt, who had just robbed the Canadian Imperial Bank of Commerce. Vaillancourt was sentenced to life imprisonment.
Constable Marc-André Gagnon	Sûreté du Québec	near Saint-Bruno, Quebec	February 10, 1973	Killed in a vehicle accident
Constable J.P. Richard Mérette	Sûreté du Québec	Quebec	June 12, 1973	Killed in a vehicle accident
Constable Richard Larente	Police de la Communauté urbaine de Montréal	Montreal, Quebec	June 14, 1973	While investigating a suspicious vehicle, Cst. Larente's partner Cst. Oss was shot in the scalp by a suspect. When Cst. Larente went to help his partner, he was shot in the head and neck, killing him instantly. Cst. Oss survived the incident.
Constable Thomas B. Cooper	Kingston Police Force	Kingston, Ontario	November 8, 1973	Shot and killed by Thomas Joseph Blowing
Constable George Mullally	University of Prince Edward Island Police	Charlottetown, Prince Edward Island	November 15, 1973	Killed in a motor vehicle accident
Constable Leonard "Len" Slater	North Bay Police Service	North Bay, Ontario	December 1, 1973	Cst. Slater was shot and killed, and Cst. McCourt was injured by Camille Joseph Ethier with a 12-gauge shotgun. Ethier was drunk, and upset about seeing his friends girlfriend with another man, left a bar to retrieve a shotgun from his car, at which point police were alerted and the incident ensued.
Constable Normand Tremblay	Sûreté du Québec	Quebec	December 4, 1973	Killed in a vehicle accident
Constable Vaughn McKay	Ontario Provincial Police (Sudbury)	Sudbury, Ontario	December 20, 1973	Died from injuries received in a vehicle accident that occurred earlier in July.
Constable Roger Pierlet	RCMP (Surrey)	Cloverdale, Surrey, British Columbia	March 29, 1974	John Miller and his passenger Vincent Cockriell drove to the police station with the intent of killing a police officer. Cockriell wanted revenge for his brother, who had died while leading police on a car chase. The men threw a beer bottle through the window of the station, attracting Cst. Pierlet who asked Miller to step out of the vehicle. Cockriell then shot Cst. Pierlet through the open car door with a .30-30 Winchester rifle, killing Pierlet instantly.
Constable Joseph Létourneau	RCMP	Quebec	April 2, 1974	Killed in a vehicle collision
Constable Joseph Tremblay	RCMP	Quebec	April 2, 1974	Killed in a vehicle collision
Constable Luciano DeSimone	Niagara Regional Police Service	Niagara Falls, Ontario	May 2, 1974	Killed in a vehicle collision
Constable John Terrance Draginda	RCMP (Surrey)	Surrey, British Columbia	September 29, 1974	Cst. Draginda was involved in a vehicle collision that killed him as well as a married couple. Cst. Draginda's partner Cst. Hughes and the couple's 12-year-old daughter were both injured but survived.
Staff Sergeant Ronald McKay	Delta Police Department	Delta, British Columbia	November 2, 1974	Shot and killed point blank by Elery Long at Long's house after an incident at a gas station. Long was granted full parole in 2018.
Constable Aimé Pelletier	Police de la Communauté urbaine de Montréal	Montreal, Quebec	November 2, 1974	Died after being shot by Arthur Gagnier, who was fleeing following an armed robbery. Gagnier was on the run after escaping from prison, and had killed a civilian during the aforementioned robbery.
Constable Michael O’Leary	Moncton Police	Moncton, New Brunswick	December 13, 1974	On December 15, Cst. O'Leary and Cst. Bourgeois were found shot in a shallow grave after disappearing while searching for the kidnappers of a 14-year-old boy. Richard Ambrose (now Richard Bergeron) and James Hutchinson had kidnapped Raymond Stein, who was eventually released unharmed after his father paid the $15,000 ransom.
Constable Aurèle Bourgeois	Moncton Police	Moncton, New Brunswick	December 13, 1974	On December 15, Cst. O'Leary and Cst. Bourgeois were found shot in a shallow grave after disappearing while searching for the kidnappers of a 14-year-old boy. Richard Ambrose (now Richard Bergeron) and James Hutchinson had kidnapped Raymond Stein, who was eventually released unharmed after his father paid the $15,000 ransom.
Detective Boyd Davidson	Calgary Police Service	Calgary, Alberta	December 20, 1974	Killed during a siege involving Phillip Laurier Gagnon, who fired hundreds of rounds at police from his hiding spot in a house. Davidson was shot in the neck and died on the spot. The siege ended with the military tearing the house apart, and Gagnon being shot by police.
Constable Gerald A. Thompson	Ontario Provincial Police (Kemptville)	near Kemptville, Ontario	March 31, 1975	Struck by a train during a police pursuit
Constable Gary V. MacDonald	Ontario Provincial Police (Forest)	Ontario Highway 21 near Forest, Ontario	May 2, 1975	Killed in a vehicle collision
Constable Maurice Chatterson	Ontario Provincial Police (Forest)	Ontario Highway 21 near Forest, Ontario	May 2, 1975	Killed in a vehicle collision
Detective Sergeant Gilles Beauvais	SPVM	Ville-Émard, Montreal, Quebec	June 3, 1975	Shot and killed while responding to a call about an armed robbery at a residence.
Detective Ronald G. Sproule	Peel Regional Police	Ontario	July 29, 1975	Killed in a car accident
Constable Lee Wilson	Toronto Police Service	Toronto, Ontario	September 25, 1975	Killed in a motor vehicle accident
Constable John Brian Baldwinson	RCMP (Surrey)	Vancouver, British Columbia	October 28, 1975	Killed when his vehicle struck a horse that had wandered onto the highway
Corporal Eric Spicer	Dartmouth Police	Dartmouth, Nova Scotia	December 23, 1975	Just after midnight, a night watchman at the local Kiwanis club heard gunshots, and alerted police. Soon after a group of teens found taxi driver Keith McCallum bleeding on the sidewalk. Although still alive at the time, McCallum was rushed to the hospital where he would later die. While inspecting the crime scene, Cpl. Spicer's body was found 45 m (148 ft) away. Cpl. Spicer was plain-clothed and on a surveillance operation. A man named Allan MacDonald was arrested and sentenced to 12 years in prison for the murders. He later killed himself following a high-speed chase in 1994. MacDonald is thought to have been responsible for the 1990 murder of University of Western Ontario student Lynda Shaw.
Corporal Michel Bédard	Sûreté du Québec	Sainte-Brigitte-de-Laval, Quebec	December 4, 1976	Killed in a shootout during an armed robbery. One of the robbers killed himself, while the other was later shot and killed by police.
Staff Sergeant Keith Harrison	Calgary Police Service	Calgary, Alberta	March 12, 1976	Harrison was shot in the abdomen during a confrontation with 3 robbers, and died during surgery. The robbers ended up taking hostages, with one dying of an overdose and the other two being convicted of murder.
Corporal Ronald Lee	Ontario Provincial Police (Dowling)	Rayside Township, Ontario	August 28, 1976	Struck and killed by a vehicle while directing traffic
Constable Paul Gosling	Toronto Police Service	Toronto, Ontario	November 5, 1976	Killed in a motor vehicle accident
Constable Gérald Desfossés	Sûreté du Québec	Saint-Romain, Quebec	November 6, 1976	Shot and killed by a person in the back of his patrol car
Constable Bernard Brassard	Sûreté du Québec	near Grande-Vallée, Quebec	March 25, 1977	Killed in a motor vehicle accident
Constable Robert Brabant	Sûreté du Québec	Sainte-Émélie-de-l'Énergie, Quebec	March 30, 1977	Killed in an ambush during heavy fog
Constable Dennis Modest Nicklos Shwaykowski	RCMP	Red Deer, Alberta	April 6, 1977	Killed when thrown off a moving truck while trying to apprehend a criminal
Constable William "Bill" Shelever	Calgary Police Service	Calgary, Alberta	May 24, 1977	Shot in the head and killed after a suspect pulled a gun on him and his partner while they were questioning him
Constable David Kirkwood	Ottawa Police Service	Ottawa, Ontario	July 11, 1977	Shot and killed while aiding in the arrest of a suspect with a warrant for assault. The suspect surrendered after a three-hour shootout with police.
Senior Constable George David Foster	RCMP	Salt Spring Island, British Columbia	September 4, 1977	Died in a plane crash on Mount Tuam
Constable Guy Samson	Sûreté du Québec	Saint-Augustin-de-Desmaures, Quebec	September 12, 1977	Shot and killed by Alexis Paré, who was wanted for murder, while trying to break down a door to arrest him.
Sergeant Ronald E. McKean	Collingwood Police	Collingwood, Ontario	October 12, 1977	Shot with a concealed shotgun by a fugitive who had escaped Collins Bay Maximum Security Federal Prison
Corporal Barry Warren Lidstone	RCMP	Hoyt, New Brunswick	January 6, 1978	Shot and killed along during a family dispute in a trailer
Constable Joseph Brophyn	RCMP	Hoyt, New Brunswick	January 6, 1978	Shot and killed along during a family dispute in a trailer
Constable John S. Kusznier	Thunder Bay Police Service	Thunder Bay, Ontario	January 15, 1978	Shot during a gunfight with two armed men after responding to a disturbance at a nightclub
Constable Dennis Anthony Onofrey	RCMP	Virden, Manitoba	January 23, 1978	Cst. Onofrey was killed and three were wounded during a shootout at an inn when two suspects in a car theft were questioned and one opened fire. The perpetrator then forced his way into an Oak Lake home and held three people hostage. The perpetrator, Donald Archer, surrendered and the hostages were freed five days later.
Constable William Iraneus Seward	RCMP	Toronto, Ontario	February 15, 1978	Died in a car accident
Constable Thomas Brian King	RCMP (Saskatoon)	Saskatoon, Saskatchewan	April 25, 1978	Ambushed, tortured, and killed by two local high school students
Constable James Begbie	Trenton Police	Trenton, Ontario	June 22, 1978	Killed in a motorcycle accident
Constable John Lau	Kingston Police Force	Kingston, Ontario	July 29, 1978	Killed in a vehicle collision during a police chase
Constable Henry Snedden	Toronto Police Service	Toronto, Ontario	September 15, 1978	Shot with his own revolver while trying to arrest a man during a neighbour dispute.
Constable Paul E. Patterson	Ontario Provincial Police (Oak Ridges)	Vaughan, Ontario	October 28, 1978	Killed in a motor vehicle accident
Constable Lindberg Bruce Davis	RCMP	Portage la Prairie, Manitoba	January 8, 1979	Killed in a motor vehicle accident
Constable Mark Percy McLachlan	RCMP	Carmacks, Yukon	February 2, 1979	Killed in a head-on crash during a blizzard that also killed the other driver
Constable René Vallée	Police de la Communauté urbaine de Montréal	Outremont, Quebec	February 16, 1979	Cst. Vallée and his partner Cst. Smith were both shot by two suspect, who had also shot another police officer, Cst. Bastien during an earlier armed robbery in Mount Royal. Cst. Vallée later succumbed to his injuries in the hospital.
Constable Joseph Doucet	RCMP	St. Antoine, New Brunswick	August 18, 1979	Killed in a plane crash (cause unknown) while conducting surveillance for a drug bust
Constable Gordon Alfred Brooks	RCMP (Cape Dorset)	Frobisher Bay, Northwest Territories (present-day Nunavut)	November 12, 1979	Cst. Brooks and S/Cst. Etidloi drowned along with two Inuit hunters when the canoe they were in capsized during a blizzard.
Special Constable Ningeoseak Etidloi	RCMP (Cape Dorset)	Frobisher Bay, Northwest Territories (present-day Nunavut)	November 12, 1979	Cst. Brooks and S/Cst. Etidloi drowned along with two Inuit hunters when the canoe they were in capsized during a blizzard.
Constable Duncan T. McAleese	Ontario Provincial Police (Simcoe)	Simcoe, Ontario	January 23, 1980	Cst. McAleese was shot with a shotgun by Robert Bruce Mitchell after arriving to a scheduled meeting with him. Mitchell had developed a grudge against Cst. McAleese after he had arrested him from drunk driving in 1979. Mitchell had called Cst. McAleese to tell him that he had information about drug traffickers. Cst. McAleese later died at Norfolk General Hospital.
Constable George H. Bennett	Ontario Provincial Police (Orillia)	Swift Rapids, Ontario	February 12, 1980	Killed in a snowmobile accident
Constable Michael William Sweet	Toronto Police Service	Toronto, Ontario	March 14, 1980	Cst. Sweet was shot while responding to a restaurant robbery. While Cst. Sweet was bleeding out, the robbers held him hostage and refused to let him receive medical treatment despite his requests. When police stormed the restaurant they found that Cst. Sweet had succumbed to his injuries.
Constable Roy John William Karwaski	RCMP	Prince Albert, Saskatchewan	May 24, 1980	Killed in a vehicle collision
Auxillery Constable Dennis Lenard Fraser	RCMP	Port Alberni, British Columbia	June 4, 1980	Struck and killed by a drunk motorist on a motorcycle
Constable Richard John Sedgwick	RCMP	near Airdrie, Alberta	August 16, 1980	Killed in a car accident involving his police car
Constable Gilles Lamarre	Sûreté du Québec	Montreal, Quebec	September 19, 1980	Died in a motorcycle accident while on duty
Constable Thomas James Agar	RCMP	Richmond, British Columbia	September 19, 1980	Shot and killed by Steven LeClair along with three others. LeClair had been kicked out of a Vancouver pub, but returned with a handgun and killed two employees and a patron. LeClair then carjacked a passing vehicle and forced them to drive him to the RCMP station in Richmond where, upon seeing Cst. Agar, fatally shot him in the chest.
Constable André Simard	Sûreté du Québec	Beauceville, Quebec	November 2, 1980	Died following a vehicle collision
Constable Thomas Hicks	Ontario Provincial Police (Sudbury)	Copper Cliff, Ontario	November 7, 1980	Killed in a vehicle collision involving an impaired driver
Constable Richard M. Verdecchia	Ontario Provincial Police (Huntsville)	Ontario Highway 141 near Burk's Falls, Ontario	January 2, 1981	Shot and killed by Gary Fitzgerald, who along with a friend, used stolen guns to rob a gas station, killing the attendant. Fitzgerald shot Cst. Verdecchia as he approached the car after it had drifted onto a snow bank during a pursuit. The two men then fled the scene in Cst. Verdecchia's cruise, and were later found in another stolen car and arrested.
Constable Pierre Brulé	Police de la Communauté urbaine de Montréal	Montreal, Quebec	April 1, 1981	Killed in a motor vehicle incident
Constable Serge Lamy	Sûreté du Québec	Saint-Thomas-de-Joliette, Quebec	May 23, 1981	Killed in a motor vehicle incident
Constable Perley Calhoun	Fredericton Police	Fredericton, New Brunswick	July 5, 1981	Accidentally shot by colleague
Constable Kenneth M. Swett	Ontario Provincial Police (Ottawa)	near Ottawa, Ontario	July 17, 1981	Killed in a motor vehicle incident
Fishery Officer Joseph V. Tremblett	Fisheries and Oceans Canada	Lake Melville, Newfoundland and Labrador	August 5, 1981	Accidentally drowned
Corporal Ole Roust Larsen	RCMP (Climax)	Climax, Saskatchewan	August 11, 1981	Shot and killed while inspecting a vehicle in the border town of Climax. The suspect then fled into Montana, and later committed suicide.
Constable James Franklin Thomas	RCMP	Christina Lake, British Columbia	August 31, 1981	Killed in a motor vehicle accident
Constable Percival Cummins	Toronto Police Service	Toronto, Ontario	September 23, 1981	Shot in the neck with his service weapon during a scuffle with a suspect. Cst. Cummins later died two hours later in the hospital.
Sergeant Jacques Martin	Sûreté du Québec	Gaspésie, Quebec	October 15, 1981	Killed in a motor vehicle incident
Constable Michel Vincent	Longueuil Police	Longueuil, Quebec	November 3, 1981	Killed by Randall Tabah during an armed robbery
Constable Emmanuel Cloutier	Police de la Communauté urbaine de Montréal	Montreal, Quebec	November 6, 1981	Shot and killed by an armed robber
Constable Barry Flynn McKinnon	RCMP	Hamilton, Ontario	December 16, 1981	Killed in a motor vehicle incident
Constable Pirthipaul Sanghera	Vancouver Police Department	Vancouver, British Columbia	January 8, 1982	Killed in a motor vehicle incident
Constable Laurier Bédard	Sûreté du Québec	near Chicoutimi, Quebec	January 20, 1982	Killed in a motor vehicle incident
Constable William H. Smith	Ontario Provincial Police (North Bay)	near North Bay, Ontario	February 16, 1982	Killed in a motor vehicle incident
Detective Inspector Lorne I. Foran	Ontario Provincial Police (Toronto)	North Dorchester Township, Ontario	May 4, 1982	Killed when his car ran off the road, causing a rollover, while driving home
Constable Richard J.C. Hopkins	Ontario Provincial Police (Mount Forest)	Arthur, Ontario	May 9, 1982	Shot with a shotgun and instantly killed by Jeffrey Scott Breese, who was setting buildings on fire and shooting at cars
Park Warden Robert J. Leblanc	Parks Canada	Kouchibouguac National Park, New Brunswick	May 24, 1982	Stepped on a downed wire while responding to a vehicle accident
Constable Douglas Butler	RCMP	near Oxbow, Saskatchewan	October 16, 1982	Killed in a vehicle accident
Detective William Hawkins	Peel Regional Police	Region of Peel, Ontario	November 19, 1982	Killed in a motor vehicle accident
Detective Volker Scheja	Peel Regional Police	Region of Peel, Ontario	November 19, 1982	Killed in a motor vehicle accident
Constable Serge LaForêt	Police de la Communauté urbaine de Montréal	Montreal, Quebec	November 24, 1982	Killed in a motor vehicle accident
Constable Richard Dubé	Sûreté du Québec	Sainte-Foy, Quebec	May 27, 1983	Killed in a motor vehicle accident
Constable Russell O’Connor	Ottawa Police Service	Ottawa, Ontario	September 7, 1983	Killed in a motorcycle accident
Constable Bruce K. Crew	Ontario Provincial Police (Goderich)	Goderich, Ontario	September 25, 1983	Killed in accident involving another police cruiser
Constable David W. Utman	Nepean Police Service	Ottawa, Ontario	October 14, 1983	Shot and killed while sitting at a restaurant
Constable Daniel Keough	RCMP (Waskesiu)	Saskatoon, Saskatchewan	October 27, 1983	Died in the hospital following a vehicle incident
Conservation Officer Robert Logan	Manitoba Conservation	Dauphin Lake, Manitoba	November 3, 1983	Died in a vehicle collision
Special Constable Wayne Graham Myers	RCMP	near Ucluelet, British Columbia	December 14, 1983	Killed in a helicopter crash caused by unauthorized cables at a logging site
Corporal Francis Jones	RCMP	near Ucluelet, British Columbia	December 14, 1983	Killed in a helicopter crash caused by unauthorized cables at a logging site
Corporal William McIntyre	Ontario Provincial Police (Toronto)	Oakville, Ontario	April 21, 1984	Shot under unclear circumstances
Constable Robert Charles Anderson	RCMP	Kamloops, British Columbia	May 4, 1984	Killed in a crash during a high speed chase
Constable Douglas F. Tribbling	York Regional Police	Markham, Ontario	August 21, 1984	Died in the hospital two days after being shot during a burglary
Constable Dwayne B. Piukkala	Peel Regional Police	Mississauga, Ontario	August 26, 1984	Cst. Piukkala was stabbed and killed while responding to a call to an apartment made to lure an officer there to be attacked. The culprit then committed suicide.
Constable David Dunmore	Toronto Police Service	Toronto, Ontario	September 18, 1984	Shot and killed while pursuing a stolen vehicle
Patrolman Peter Beaulieu	Police de la Communauté urbaine de Montréal	Montreal, Quebec	October 6, 1984	Shot and killed along a civilian while attempting to arrest two car thieves. One of the culprits was later shot and killed by the police, and the other was arrested.
Constable John G. Ross	Ontario Provincial Police (Woodstock)	Woodstock, Ontario	October 7, 1984	Shot and killed by a murder suspect, who was later killed by police
Constable William J. Grant	York Regional Police	Kennedy Road, Ontario	October 9, 1984	On a foggy night, Cst. Grant observed a vehicle driving erratically and began to pursue it. The driver quickly drove off, and then after reversing, crashed at high speed into Cst. Grant, killing him. The culprit, who had just stolen his parents car after an argument with his girlfriend, then used Cst. Grant's service weapon to commit suicide.
Constable Vernon L. Miller	Ontario Provincial Police (Matheson)	Matheson, Ontario	November 16, 1984	Cst. Miller was shot in the back with a shotgun and killed in a restaurant
Detective Sergeant Robert Larue	Police de la Communauté urbaine de Montréal	Montreal, Quebec	December 1, 1984	Shot and killed through his kitchen window as an initiation ritual for a biker gang.
Constable Allen Gary Giesbrecht	RCMP	Vegreville, Alberta	January 13, 1985	Killed while investigating a domestic dispute
Constable Michael Buday	RCMP	Teslin Lake, Yukon	March 19, 1985	Shot and killed by murderer Sheslay Free Mike (Michael Oros) in an event dubbed the "Teslin Lake Incident"
Constable Richard McLaughlin	Ontario Provincial Police (Spanish)	near Spanish, Ontario	June 25, 1985	Killed in a motor vehicle accident
Constable Yves Têtu	Quebec City Police Service	Quebec City, Quebec	July 3, 1985	Cst. Têtu and Cst. Giguère were shot and killed during a robbery of the Canada Dental Depot. It was later revealed that fellow police officer Serge Lefebvre from the Sainte-Foy police department was responsible. After a suicide attempt on the Quebec Bridge, Lefebvre was captured and sentenced to life in prison.
Constable Jacques Giguère	Quebec City Police Service	Quebec City, Quebec	July 3, 1985	Cst. Têtu and Cst. Giguère were shot and killed during a robbery of the Canada Dental Depot. It was later revealed that fellow police officer Serge Lefebvre from the Sainte-Foy police department was responsible. After a suicide attempt on the Quebec Bridge, Lefebvre was captured and sentenced to life in prison.
Sergeant Jacques Philion	City of Aylmer Police	Aylmer, Quebec	July 27, 1985	Killed in a motor vehicle incident
Constable Donald C. Campbell	Ontario Provincial Police (Kincardine)	near Kincardine, Ontario	August 3, 1985	Cst. Campbell was killed and Cst. Sullivan was injured when their patrol cruiser was struck by a speeding vehicle with no lights on being operated by a drunk driver.
Constable Jacinthe Fyfe	Police de la Communauté urbaine de Montréal	Montreal, Quebec	October 26, 1985	Cst. Fyfe was shot in the neck and killed by a man hiding in a bush while responding to a call about someone ringing doorbells. The culprit, Réal Poirie, was found unfit to stand trial.
Wildlife Protection Officer Alain Chouinard	Québec Wildlife Protection & Resources	Quebec	November 10, 1985	Shot by a night-hunter
Constable Mario Tessier	RCMP (Ottawa)	Ottawa, Ontario	December 27, 1985	While driving to work, Cst. Tessier stopped to assist a man whose vehicle was stuck in a ditch. Upon entering into Cst. Tessier's car, the man drew a sawed-off shotgun and shot Cst. Tessier nine times. The suspect was then arrested later after stealing Cst. Tessier's car and committing an armed robbery.
Special Constable Wayne Philip Boskill	RCMP	Wollaston Lake, Saskatchewan	January 8, 1986	Special Constables Boskill and Wilson died along with 2 civilians when their plane's wing collided with the ice while trying to land at the Wollaston Lake Airport during foggy weather.
Special Constable James Wilson	RCMP	Wollaston Lake, Saskatchewan	January 8, 1986	Special Constables Boskill and Wilson died along with 2 civilians when their plane's wing collided with the ice while trying to land at the Wollaston Lake Airport during foggy weather.
Constable Randall F. Skidmore	Ontario Provincial Police (Coboconk)	near Kirkfield, Ontario	February 14, 1986	Died in a car crash while on duty
Special Constable Robert Thomas	RCMP Highway Patrol	Powerview, Manitoba	March 6, 1986	S/Cst. Thomas was shot in the back and killed by 46-year-old Edgar Martin Olson on the side of the highway after talking to Olson and his female passenger, assuming that they were out of gas. S/Cst. Thomas and his partner had turned to leave when Olson shot Thomas with a .303 rifle. S/Cst. Thomas's partner Cst. Gulliford returned fire but was shot and rendered unconscious. Martin and his passenger then drove to the Fort Alexander Reserve where he took his kids and estranged wife hostage before being overpowered and arrested and sentenced to 25 years in prison.
Corporal Budd Maurice Johanson	RCMP	near Lethbridge, Alberta	April 4, 1986	Killed in a traffic collision
Constable Frederick Allen Abel	RCMP	near Lethbridge, Alberta	April 4, 1986	Killed in a traffic collision
Constable Claude Saint-Laurent	Police de la Communauté urbaine de Montréal	Montreal, Quebec	May 10, 1986	Succumbed to his injuries at the Hôpital Maisonneuve-Rosemont, after being shot in the chest with his service weapon by Yvon Racine, who was sentenced to life in prison.
Constable Scott Gordon Berry	RCMP	Clandonald, Alberta	June 29, 1986	Died after being electrocuted by a live wire while helping an injured person
Constable Marcel Simard	Saint-Hubert Police	Saint-Hubert, Quebec	July 24, 1986	Cst. Simard was shot in the neck and killed by a suspect while talking to him. A park in Saint-Hubert is named in his honour.
Constable Robert Baril	Police de la Communauté urbaine de Montréal	Montreal, Quebec	November 13, 1986	Shot and killed with his service weapon by a suspect during a fight
Constable Danny Tremblay	Sûreté du Québec	Laurentides Wildlife Reserve, Quebec	November 19, 1986	Struck and killed by a vehicle, whose operator had fallen asleep
Corporal Jacques Hamel	Sûreté du Québec	Laurentides Wildlife Reserve, Quebec	November 19, 1986	Struck and killed by a vehicle, whose operator had fallen asleep
Special Constable Gordon Zigmund Kowalczyk	RCMP (Calgary International Airport Detachment)	near Highway 2 in Calgary, Alberta	January 26, 1987	S/Cst Kowalczyk, pursued a vehicle out of Airport property after the vehicle had left a service station in the airport without paying for gas. Kowalczyk was found by other RCMP members on the side of the Highway dead with his revolver missing after being shot with a shotgun. For the murder, Andrew Kay was charged with first degree murder and Linda Bowen was charged with manslaughter. Kowalczyk left behind three children.
Sergeant Larry Young	Vancouver Police Department	Vancouver, British Columbia	February 2, 1987	Shot and killed during a raid for the arrest of cocaine dealer John Sheffield, which had been compromised due to Sheffield purchasing a police scanner. During the following gun battle, another officer was also wounded and Sheffield was fatally shot.
Constable Emmanuel Aucoin	New Brunswick Highway Patrol (Harvey)	New Brunswick Route 640 near Yoho Lake, New Brunswick	March 8, 1987	Cst. Aucoin was found dead in his cruiser by a motorist, having been shot in the head. The culprit, a New York man named Anthony P. Romeo, was later arrested by the Massachusetts State Police at Logan International Airport while deboarding a plane from Maine.
Conservation Officer Kauko Henry Kujala	Ontario Ministry of Resources	near Parry Sound, Ontario	October 5, 1987	Killed in a helicopter crash
Constable Roland Larochelle	Sûreté du Québec	Quebec	February 6, 1988	Died in a vehicle accident
Constable Hugh Lynn	Toronto Police Service	Don Valley Parkway, Ontario	March 6, 1988	Struck by a vehicle while issuing a speeding ticket
Constable Gaétan Boutin	Sûreté du Québec (Campbell's Bay)	L'Isle-aux-Allumettes, Quebec	April 19, 1988	Cst. Boutin and Cst. Camiré were killed in a vehicle collision involving their police cruiser
Constable Mario Camiré	Sûreté du Québec (Campbell's Bay)	L'Isle-aux-Allumettes, Quebec	April 19, 1988	Cst. Boutin and Cst. Camiré were killed in a vehicle collision involving their police cruiser
Constable Richard Rochefort	Sûreté du Québec (Rimouski)	Rimouski, Quebec	June 26, 1988	Died in a plane crash while doing aerial road safety surveillance
Conservation Officer Donald C. Wood	Nova Scotia Department of Natural Resources	Nova Scotia	September 9, 1988	Died in an explosives accident
Constable John R. Gregovski	Ontario Provincial Police (Niagara Falls)	Garden City Skyway, Ontario	January 4, 1989	Died when his cruiser was hit by a trailer while he was assisting a driver whose van had broken down. The van driver who was also in the cruiser was killed as well.
Constable Della Sonya Beyak	RCMP	near Assiniboia, Saskatchewan	March 15, 1989	Died in a vehicle collision that killed two others
Special Constable Nancy Marie Puttkemery	RCMP Air Services	Crossfield, Alberta	December 9, 1989	Died in a plane crash during low visibility when the left wing of the aircraft hit a guy wire of a radio tower
Special Constable Vincent Norman Timms	RCMP Surveillance	Crossfield, Alberta	December 9, 1989	Died in a plane crash during low visibility when the left wing of the aircraft hit a guy wire of a radio tower
Wildlife Protection Officer Luc Guindon	Québec Wildlife Protection & Resources	near Ste-Agathe-des-Monts, Quebec	October 10, 1989	Shot through the heart by a moose poacher
Conservation Officer Keith Bartley	Manitoba Conservation	Manitoba	November 29, 1989	Died in a vehicle accident while trying to apprehend a night hunter
Constable Ezio Faraone	Edmonton Police Service	Edmonton, Alberta	June 25, 1990	Shot and killed by an armed robbery suspect, who had exited from being hidden in the backseat of a car, while Cst. Faraone was distracted by the other suspect, who he believed to be the only one. Albert Foulston was sentenced to 20 years in prison for Faraone's murder, and later died by a drug overdose.
Corporal Marcel Lemay	Sûreté du Québec (Quebec City)	Oka, Quebec	July 11, 1990	Shot by an unknown assailant during the Oka crisis. His murder remains unsolved.
Conservation Officer Murray Doell	Saskatchewan Parks and Renewable Resources	near Buffalo Narrows, Saskatchewan	August 17, 1990	Died in a helicopter crash while fighting a forest fire
Sergeant Jean-Claude Cadieux	Sûreté du Québec (Outaouais)	Outaouais, Quebec	November 21, 1990	Died in a collision with a truck
Constable Yves Phaneuf	Police de la Communauté urbaine de Montréal	Montreal, Quebec	June 19, 1991	Shot and killed while arresting a cyclist. A suspect, who was found to have Cst. Phaneuf's service weapon in his possession was acquitted of the murder in 1991.
Sergeant Thomas J. Cooper	Ontario Provincial Police (Grassy Narrows)	Asubpeeschoseewagong First Nation, Ontario	July 25, 1991	Shot and killed while responding to a firearms complaint. The perpetrator, Thomas Pahpasay, also shot at Sgt. Cooper's partner as well as officers collecting evidence.
Conservation Officer Theodore "Art" Haugen	Saskatchewan Parks and Renewable Resources	near Southend, Saskatchewan	July 26, 1991	Died in a float plane crash that killed three others
Constable Brian John Hutchinson	RCMP	Châteauguay, Quebec	August 16, 1991	Died a year after being struck in the head by bricks hurled by protestors during the Oka crisis.
Constable Scott Rossiter	Ingersoll Police	Ingersoll, Ontario	September 19, 1991	Fatally shot by a cyclist while on patrol. The suspect, David O'Neil, was found murdered three months later.
Constable Christopher Riglar	RCMP (Victoria)	Victoria, British Columbia	September 28, 1991	Died in the hospital after being struck by a drunk driver
Constable Andrew B. Gordon	Ontario Provincial Police (Madoc)	Hastings County, Ontario	May 3, 1992	Died in a vehicle collision with a drunk driver. The drunk driver and their passenger were both also killed in the incident.
Auxiliary Constable Joseph Ernest Balmer	RCMP	150 Mile House, British Columbia	August 29, 1992	Killed in a vehicle collision
Wildlife Protection Officer Patrick Poirier	Québec Wildlife Protection & Resources	near Schefferville, Quebec	September 15, 1992	Died of hypothermia after his floatplane overturned in a lake
Constable Rob Vanderwiel	Calgary Police Service	Calgary, Alberta	September 22, 1992	Shot and killed during a traffic stop
Park Warden Patrick Daniel Sheehan	Parks Canada	Columbia Icefield, Alberta	November 26, 1992	Died in an ice climbing accident
Constable Chantal Mattio	Sûreté du Québec (Ste-Agathe)	Lac-des-Seize-Îles, Quebec	December 7, 1992	Died after losing control of her vehicle during a manhunt
Constable Jeffrey Paolozzi	Niagara Regional Police Service	Welland, Ontario	February 6, 1993	Shot and killed by a bullet accidentally discharged prior to a training session at a police gun range
Constable Brent Harold Veefkind	RCMP, Grande Prairie Municipal Detachment	Bezanson, Alberta	March 11, 1993	Killed in a traffic accident while on duty
Constable Eric Nzystedt	Ontario Provincial Police (Minden)	near Kinmount, Ontario	July 3, 1993	Stabbed in the femoral artery while searching for a suspect during a call to a domestic dispute
Constable Joseph MacDonald	Greater Sudbury Police Service	Sudbury, Ontario	October 7, 1993	Shot during a violent altercation resulting from a traffic stop. Cst. MacDonald had managed to shoot one of the two men involved but they both fled before being pursued and caught by police.
Constable Rick Sonnenberg	Calgary Police Service	Calgary, Alberta	October 8, 1993	Fatally struck by a speeding suspect while trying to deploy spike strips
Constable Richard M. Jean	Ontario Provincial Police (Casselman)	near Casselman, Ontario	October 24, 1993	Died in a collision between their police cruiser and a Via Rail train
Constable Alain Desforges	Ontario Provincial Police (Casselman)	near Casselman, Ontario	October 24, 1993	Died in a collision between their police cruiser and a Via Rail train
Constable Yvan Filteau	Quebec City Police Service	near Montmorency Falls, Quebec	October 25, 1993	Killed in a helicopter crash while searching for a missing man. The pilot was also killed.
Detective Sergeant Paule Simard	Quebec City Police Service	near Montmorency Falls, Quebec	October 25, 1993	Killed in a helicopter crash while searching for a missing man. The pilot was also killed.
Officer Gaston Paradis	Sûreté du Québec	near Montmorency Falls, Quebec	October 25, 1993	Killed in a helicopter crash while searching for a missing man. The pilot was also killed.
Constable Albert S. Taylor	Naicatchewenin First Nations Police	Couchiching First Nation, Ontario	November 9, 1993	Died when his police cruiser was struck by a train at an unprotected rail crossing.
Constable Stéphane Roy	Sûreté du Québec (La Sarre)	Quebec Route 393 near Destor, Quebec	February 24, 1994	Killed in a vehicle accident during poor weather
Customs Superintendent James Finnamore	Canada Border Services Agency	Perth-Andover, New Brunswick	April 16, 1994	Drowned when their vehicle was swept and submerged by the water of the Aroostook River
Customs Inspector David Moore	Canada Border Services Agency	Perth-Andover, New Brunswick	April 16, 1994	Drowned when their vehicle was swept and submerged by the water of the Aroostook River
Customs Inspector Ruth Louine Korum	Canada Border Services Agency	near Prince George, British Columbia	May 24, 1994	Died in a car crash along with her vehicle's occupant
Constable Todd E. Baylis	Toronto Police Service	Toronto, Ontario	June 17, 1994	Shot at and killed during a foot pursuit of a suspect wanted for drug trafficking.
Park Warden Simon Parboosingh	Parks Canada	Mount Athabasca, Alberta	August 31, 1994	Died in an avalanche
Constable John Knight	Toronto Police Service	Toronto, Ontario	September 28, 1994	Died after striking a bridge abutement in his car during a police pursuit.
Police Chief Denis Nadeau	Sainte-Marie Police	Sainte-Marie, Quebec	April 28, 1995	The town undertaker Clement Mercier had an argument with his wife which led to her fleeing and calling the police, leaving her 10-year old daughter in the house. Police Chief Nadeau, a personal friend of Mercier decided to answer the call himself. Mercier shot Nadeau in the back of the head as he walked up the driveway, and later fired at first responders trying to reach his body. After a 30 hour standoff, SWAT raided the house to find Mercier had hung himself. Tragically it was found that he had murdered the 10 year-old prior to Nadeau arriving at the house.
Constable Malcolm Williams	RCMP (Winnipeg)	Perimeter Highway, Manitoba	April 28, 1995	Died in a single-vehicle collision
Constable Kenneth Roy	Ontario Provincial Police (Rockland)	South Porcupine, Ontario	May 23, 1995	Died in a single-vehicle collision
Conservation Officer Ken Skwark	Manitoba Ministry of Natural Resources	Churchill River near Leaf Rapids, Manitoba	June 28, 1995	Conservation Officer Skwark was among three people who died in a helicopter crash on the Churchill River when the rotor blade struck the river during reduced visibility. Five others survived and were rescued.
Constable Norman Atkins	RCMP (Westfield)	on New Brunswick Route 7 near Oromocto, New Brunswick	July 8, 1995	Died after his car struck a moose
Constable Joseph Gagné	RCMP (Digby)	on Nova Scotia Route 217 in Digby County, Nova Scotia	September 6, 1995	Died in a car collision while on duty
Constable Odette Pinard	Police de la Communauté urbaine de Montréal	Kirkland, Quebec	November 27, 1995	Cst. Pinard was alone in the police station writing an incident report at 4 PM when she was shot in the face at her desk. Her murder remains unsolved.
Senior Constable Michael Gula	Ontario Provincial Police (Niagara Falls)	on the Queen Elizabeth Way, Ontario	April 2, 1996	Struck and killed by a pickup truck in a hit-and-run while standing by two police cruisers on the shoulder
Constable Andre Lalonde	Police de la Communauté urbaine de Montréal	Senneville, Quebec	April 26, 1996	Shot three times and killed after pulling over a vehicle for a defective muffler. The perpetrator had no immediately apparent motive for killing him.
Sergeant Derek C. Burkholder	RCMP	Martin's Brook, Nova Scotia	June 14, 1996	Sgt. Burkholder was ambushed and shot by fisherman Ronald Stevens using a concealed handgun while responding to a domestic dispute. Stevens was then shot and killed by back-up officers. This was the first murder of a mountie in Nova Scotia history.
Constable Leo Francis	RCMP (Westfield)	Oromocto, New Brunswick	July 5, 1996	Killed in a vehicle collision
Fishery Officer Dean Miller	Fisheries and Oceans Canada	near Kitimat, British Columbia	September 18, 1996	Died from cardiac arrest caused by hypothermia after capsizing into a river during swiftwater training
Conservation Officer Kevin Ray Misfeldt	Saskatchewan Parks and Renewable Resources	Alberta-Saskatchewan border near Marsden, Saskatchewan	January 24, 1997	Died in a plane crash along with another individual while surveying White-tailed deer
Conservation Officer Breton Thomas	Saskatchewan Parks and Renewable Resources	Alberta-Saskatchewan border near Marsden, Saskatchewan	January 24, 1997	Died in a plane crash along with another individual while surveying White-tailed deer
Senior Constable Thomas P. Coffin	Ontario Provincial Police (Midland)	Penetanguishene, Ontario	May 31, 1997	Cst. Coffin was shot in the back of the head with a handgun by Al MacDonald while sitting at the bar in the Commodore Hotel with other officers after completing a shift. MacDonald was a captain with the Toronto Fire Department and the former Chair of the Penetanguishene Police Services Board. Cst. Coffin had charged MacDonald with drunk driving in 1996.
Forest Officer Daniel Warren Brink	Alberta Environmental Protection	near Grande Prairie, Alberta	October 20, 1997	Died in a helicopter crash
Constable Joseph Carrière	RCMP (Cole Harbour)	Bras d'Or Lake, Nova Scotia	November 30, 1997	Cst. Carrière drowned while inspecting the hull of a ship suspected of smuggling contraband drugs.
Constable Gerald Fortis	RCMP (Sumas Highway Patrol)	Trans-Canada Highway near Chilliwack, British Columbia	December 25, 1997	Died on Christmas night in a single vehicle collision.
Detective Constable William Hancox	Toronto Police Service	Toronto, Ontario	August 4, 1998	Stabbed by two women when he went to buy a soft drink while working undercover.
Corporal Graeme Cumming	RCMP (Lethbridge)	Kipp, Alberta	August 12, 1998	Killed in a vehicle accident that also killed a truck driver
Constable David Nicholson	Waterloo Regional Police Service	Cambridge, Ontario	August 12, 1998	Drowned while trying to recover the body of a young boy from a dam in the Grand River
Constable Dominique Courchesne	Joliette Municipal Police	Notre-Dame-des-Prairies, Quebec	October 3, 1998	Died in a motor vehicle incident
Detective Constable Keith Badger	Ontario Provincial Police (Caledon)	near Caledon, Ontario	December 9, 1998	Died in a single-vehicle accident
Deputy Sheriff James Askew	British Columbia Sheriff Service	Kamloops, British Columbia	May 1, 1999	Died after being injured during dynamic training
Constable Joseph Bourdon	RCMP (Saskatchewan Highway Patrol)	Saskatchewan Highway 11 south of Saskatoon, Saskatchewan	May 7, 1999	Struck and killed by a semi-trailer
Sergeant Richard McDonald	Greater Sudbury Police Service	Sudbury, Ontario	July 28, 1999	Intentionally struck and killed by a suspect in a stolen van while standing on the media after deploying spike strips
Constable Charles Mercier	Ontario Provincial Police (Niagara Falls)	Garden City Skyway in St. Catharines, Ontario	September 30, 1999	Struck in his police cruiser by a truck driver who had fallen asleep
Senior Constable James McFadden	Ontario Provincial Police (Chatham-Kent)	Ontario Highway 401 in Chatham-Kent, Ontario	December 31, 1999	Had his police cruiser intentionally rammed into at 150 km/h while he was writing a ticket, sending the cruiser into the violater's vehicle, injuring the driver and killing Cst. McFadden. The rammer was charged with first degree murder.

=== 2000s ===
2000s

Name and rank	Agency	Location	Date	Details
Constable Mark Nieuwenhuis	Delta Police Department	Delta, British Columbia	April 8, 2000	Killed in a motorcycle crash
Sergeant Margaret J. Eve	Ontario Provincial Police (Chatham-Kent)	Chatham-Kent, Ontario	June 9, 2000	Sgt. Eve and two fellow officers were speaking with the occupants of a recently stopped vehicle when an eastbound tractor-trailer slammed into their three parked police cruisers on the highway, injuring the two other officers and killing Sgt. Eve.
Constable Noel Sadée	RCMP (Athabasca)	near Slave Lake, Alberta	July 24, 2000	Killed in a head-on collision with a school bus
Sergeant Edwin Mobley	RCMP (Prince Rupert)	Teslin Lake, British Columbia	August 15, 2000	Killed in a plane crash
Special Constable Timothy Nicholson	RCMP	Teslin Lake, British Columbia	August 15, 2000	Killed in a plane crash
Constable Alain Forget	Saint Hubert Police	Saint-Hubert, Quebec	August 15, 2000	Intentionally rammed by a stolen van while setting up a roadblock to stop bank robbery suspects.
Constable Alain Matte	Police de la Communauté urbaine de Montréal	Montreal, Quebec	September 15, 2000	Killed in a traffic accident involving his police motorcycle.
Constable John Petropoulos	Calgary Police Service	Calgary, Alberta	September 29, 2000	Fell nine feet through a ceiling while investigating a break in
Constable Jurgen Seewald	RCMP (Cape Dorset)	Kinngait, Nunavut	March 5, 2001	Fatally shot during an altercation while responding to a domestic dispute. The suspect barricaded himself in another house before finally surrendering.
Constable Darren Beatty	Calgary Police Service	Calgary, Alberta	October 17, 2001	Accidentally shot by colleague
Constable Peter Magdic	RCMP	near Southport, Manitoba	November 18, 2001	Died in a rollover in his patrol car.
Constable Dennis Strongquill	RCMP (Waywayseecappo)	Russell, Manitoba	December 21, 2001	Cst. Strongquill was shot and killed during a traffic stop in Russell, Manitoba. The suspects were later tracked down to Wolseley, Saskatchewan where one was shot and killed during a gunfight.
Constable Martin Lefebvre	Shawinigan Police	Shawinigan, Quebec	December 23, 2001	Lost control of his patrol vehicle while answering an emergency call.
Park Warden Michael Wynn	Parks Canada	Calgary, Alberta	January 13, 2002	Died in the Foothills Medical Centre after being engulfed in an avalanche at the Columbia Icefield in Jasper National Park
Constable Laura Ellis	Toronto Police Service	Toronto, Ontario	February 18, 2002	Died in a traffic accident while responding to an emergency call
Constable Benoit L’Ecuyer	Montreal Police	Montreal, Quebec	February 28, 2002	Shot and killed during a police chase
Constable Christine Diotte	RCMP (Banff)	near Banff, Alberta	March 12, 2002	Struck by a vehicle and killed after the car had lost control on the icy road
Constable Wael Audi	RCMP (Squamish)	near Squamish, British Columbia	March 29, 2002	Killed in a collision with a bus while on duty
Constable Paul Neudert	Walpole Island Police	near Wallaceburg, Ontarion (Ontario)	May 7, 2002	Killed in a car crash while on duty
Constable Alan Kuzmich	South Simcoe Police Service	Bradford West Gwillimbury, Ontario	August 21, 2002	Hit and killed by a car while investigating a stolen motorcycle
Sherriff's Officer Michel Lagacé	New Brunswick Sherriff’s Office	near Campbellton, New Brunswick	September 11, 2002	Motor vehicle incident
Constable Jimmy Ng	RCMP (Richmond)	Richmond, British Columbia	September 15, 2002	Killed in a hit and run
Patrolman Jean-Yves Therrien	Transports Québec	Laval, Quebec	October 6, 2002	Patrolman Therrien died in hospital after being struck by the same car that killed Cpl. Arseneault
Corporal Antonio Arseneault	Sûreté du Québec	Laval, Quebec	October 6, 2002	Cpl. Arseneault was killed instantly after being struck by a car while closing a traffic lane due to a broken down school bus
Superintendent Dennis Massey	RCMP (Calgary)	Calgary, Alberta	December 18, 2002	Killed in a collision with a tanker truck while on duty
Conservation Officer Walter Ceolin	Ontario Ministry of Resources	near Sault Ste. Marie, Ontario	January 21, 2003	Died in a helicopter crash while conducting an aerial moose survey
Senior Constable Phil Shrive	Ontario Provincial Police (Renfrew)	near Renfrew, Ontario	May 23, 2003	Killed in a car crash while on duty
Constable Ghislain Maurice	RCMP (Strathcona County)	near Sherwood Park, Alberta	June 10, 2003	Killed during a collision with a gravel truck while on duty
Senior Constable John Paul Flagg	Ontario Provincial Police (Quinte)	near Almonte, Ontario	September 20, 2003	Killed in a motorcycle crash during a police chase
Corporal Stephen Gibson	Canadian Forces Military Police	near Medicine Hat, Alberta	September 26, 2003	Cpl. Gibson was killed in a car crash while on duty
Constable Patrick Levesque	Sûreté du Québec	near Michel-Pouliot Gaspé Airport, Quebec	September 27, 2003	Cst. Levesque was killed in a plane crash while transporting a prisoner from the Magdalen Islands. The prisoner and the pilot were also killed in the crash.
Corporal Jim Galloway	RCMP (Sherwood Park)	Spruce Grove, Alberta	February 28, 2004	Cpl. Galoway was shot and killed while assisting the Edmonton Emergency Response team alongside his police dog Cito during a standoff at a home. When the suspect tried to flee in a vehicle, a gunfight occurred that also left the suspect dead.
Constable Chris Garrett	Cobourg Police Service	Cobourg, Ontario	May 15, 2004	Cst. Garrett was shot and killed after responding to a call about a robbery in a parking lot
Constable Tyler Boutilier	Ontario Provincial Police (Grenville)	near Seeleys Bay, Ontario	May 23, 2004	Died during a collision while on duty
Auxiliary Constable Glen Gregory Evely	RCMP (Vernon)	Vernon, British Columbia	November 13, 2004	Killed when the police cruiser he was in was slammed into by a stolen truck running a red light during a police pursuit
Constable Anthony Gordon	RCMP (Whitecourt)	Rochfort Bridge, Alberta	March 3, 2005	Four RCMP officers were killed by James Roszko while executing a search warrant at a rural marijuana farm
Constable Lionide Johnston	RCMP (Mayerthorpe)	Rochfort Bridge, Alberta	March 3, 2005	Four RCMP officers were killed by James Roszko while executing a search warrant at a rural marijuana farm
Constable Brock Myrol	RCMP (Mayerthorpe)	Rochfort Bridge, Alberta	March 3, 2005	Four RCMP officers were killed by James Roszko while executing a search warrant at a rural marijuana farm
Constable Peter Schiemann	RCMP (Mayerthorpe)	Rochfort Bridge, Alberta	March 3, 2005	Four RCMP officers were killed by James Roszko while executing a search warrant at a rural marijuana farm
Constable Jean Minguy	RCMP (Vernon)	Okanagan Lake, British Columbia	July 3, 2005	Cst. Minguy drowned after an accident on board an RCMP patrol vessel
Constable Jose Agostinho	RCMP (Wetaskiwin)	near Leduc, Alberta	July 4, 2005	Cst. Agostinho was killed when his parked police cruiser was hit by a truck while investigating another crash on Highway 2
Constable Andrew Potts	Ontario Provincial Police (Bracebridge)	near Bracebridge, Ontario	July 20, 2005	Cst. Potts was killed and fellow officer Cst. Hanes was injured after their police cruiser collided with a moose
Wildlife Protection Officer Fernand Vachon	Québec Wildlife Protection & Resources	near Saint-Théophile, Quebec	November 5, 2005	WPO Vachon and WPO Rouchette were killed alongside the pilot when the plane in which they were conducting aerial surveillance of night-hunting with crashed near the Maine border
Wildlife Protection Officer Nicolas Rochette	Québec Wildlife Protection & Resources	near Saint-Théophile, Quebec	November 5, 2005	WPO Vachon and WPO Rouchette were killed alongside the pilot when the plane in which they were conducting aerial surveillance of night-hunting with crashed near the Maine border
Officer Valerie Gignac	Laval Police Service	Laval, Quebec	December 14, 2005	Shot through the door while responding to a domestic dispute
Constable John Goyer	Abbotsford Police Department	Abbotsford, British Columbia	April 19, 2006	Cst. Goyer died from ALS which WorkSafeBC determined do have been related to a beating Goyer received while on duty in 2001.
Constable John Atkinson	Windsor Police Service	Windsor, Ontario	May 5, 2006	Cst. Atkinson was shot and killed while questioning two men at a convenience store
Senior Constable Don Doucet	Sault Ste. Marie Police Service	Sault Ste. Marie, Ontario	May 14, 2006	Died in a collision while on duty
Constable Robin Cameron	RCMP (Spiritwood)	Spiritwood, Saskatchewan	July 7, 2006	Killed during a police pursuit by 41-year-old Curtis Alfred Dagenais
Constable Marc Bourdages	RCMP (Spiritwood)	Spiritwood, Saskatchewan	July 7, 2006	Killed during a police pursuit by 41-year-old Curtis Alfred Dagenais
Constable David Mounsey	Ontario Provincial Police (Huron County)	Clinton, Ontario	November 13, 2006	Cst. Mounsey died from injuries received during a car collision that occurred while on duty
Officer Richard Cayouette	Québec Wildlife Protection & Resources	near Chapais, Quebec	March 1, 2007	Cayouette was killed in a snow mobile accident where his partner was also injured
Sergeant Detective Daniel Tessier	Laval Police Service	Brossard, Quebec	March 2, 2007	Cst. Tessier was shot and killed and another officer and a civilian were injured when a suspect opened fire during a drug bust on a cocaine trafficking ring
Constable Robert Plunkett	York Regional Police	Markham, Ontario	August 2, 2007	Cst. Plunkett was killed after being hit and dragged by a car driven by a 19-year-old. He was married with three children.
Constable Christopher John Worden	RCMP (Hay River)	Hay River, Northwest Territories	October 6, 2007	Cst. Worden was found fatally shot in a wooded area behind a home by other members of the RCMP Hay River detachment after losing radio contact while responding to a complaint
Constable Douglas Scott	RCMP	Kimmirut, Nunavut	November 5, 2007	Cst. Scott was shot and killed by a drunk driver
Corporal Craig Alexander Wilson	Canadian Forces Military Police	Kingston, Ontario	June 5, 2008	Died in a motorcycle accident
Constable Eric Lavoie	Laval Police Service	Laval, Quebec	September 8, 2008	Cst. Lavoie succumbed to his injuries after a car accident while on duty
Constable James Lundblad	RCMP	near Millet, Alberta	May 5, 2009	Cst. Lundblad was killed when his police car was involved in a collision with a truck on Highway 2A
Constable Alan Hack	Ontario Provincial Police (Elgin)	Newbury, Ontario	July 6, 2009	Cst. Hack died from injuries received when the police cruiser he was in collided with a truck during a pursuit
Constable Mélanie Roy	Lévis Police	Lévis, Quebec	September 7, 2009	Died when she lost control of her vehicle while on duty
Constable Ireneusz Czapnik	Ottawa Police Service	Ottawa, Ontario	December 29, 2009	Cst. Czapnik was ambushed and killed while sitting in his police cruiser by 43-year-old Kevin Gregson with a knife

=== 2010s ===
2010s

Name and rank	Agency	Location	Date	Details
Constable Artem Otchakovski	Peel Regional Police	Brampton, Ontario	March 1, 2010	Died in a car crash while on duty
Constable Vu Pham	Ontario Provincial Police (Huron County)	Winthrop, Ontario	March 8, 2010	Died in the hospital after being shot by Fred Preston, who was wanted by the police for making threats.
Constable Chelsey Robinson	RCMP (Stony Plain)	Stony Plain, Alberta	June 21, 2010	Died in a car collision while on duty
Constable Michael Bernard Potvin	RCMP (Mayo)	Stewart River near Mayo, Yukon	July 13, 2010	Drowned when the police boat he was in capsized
Constable Sébastien Coghlan-Goyette	Sûreté du Québec	Les Cèdres, Quebec	November 14, 2010	Cst. Coghlan-Goyette and his student passenger were killed in a vehicle collision
Sergeant Ryan Russell	Toronto Police Service	Toronto, Ontario	January 12, 2011	Hit and killed by a stolen truck with a snowplow attached during a police pursuit
Constable Garrett Styles	York Regional Police	East Gwillimbury, Ontario	June 28, 2011	Cst. Styles was killed after pulling over a truck driven by an unlicensed 15-year-old, who then accelerated, dragging him outside the truck until the driver lost control of the vehicle, causing it to flip and pin Cst. Styles under it.
Constable Vincent Roy	Bromont Police Department	Near Bromont, Quebec	December 1, 2011	Rammed and killed during a traffic stop. Cst. Roy was married with two young children.
Constable Derek Pineo	RCMP (Wilkie)	near Wilkie, Saskatchewan	July 20, 2012	Killed when his police car collided with a moose
Community Peace Officer Rod Lazenby	Municipal District of Foothills Protective Services	North of Priddis, Alberta	August 10, 2012	Lazenby was beaten and killed during an altercation with a person regarding an un-permitted dog kennel. He was married with three children.
Constable Katia Hadouchi	Sureté du Québec	Saint-Ambroise-de-Kildare, Quebec	September 27, 2012	Died after losing control of her patrol car while on duty
Constable Donovan Lagrange	Sureté du Québec	near Bois-des-Filion, Quebec	October 6, 2012	Struck by a car while walking back to his car from a speed trap
Constable Adrian Oliver	RCMP (Surrey)	Surrey, British Columbia	November 13, 2012	Died in a car crash with a semi truck
Conservation Officer Howard Lavers	Newfoundland and Labrador Fish and Wildlife	South of Hawke's Bay, Newfoundland and Labrador	February 21, 2013	Drowned when his snowmobile fell through the ice on Eastern Blue Mountain Pond
Constable Steve Dery	Kativik Regional Police Force	Kuujjuaq, Quebec	March 2, 2013	Shot and killed during a domestic dispute
Constable Jennifer Kovach	Guelph Police Service	Guelph, Ontario	March 14, 2013	Died in a car accident while on duty
Conservation Officer Justin Knackstedt	Saskatchewan Environment and Resource Management	South of Saskatoon, Saskatchewan	May 31, 2013	Killed by a drunk driver while helping the RCMP with directing traffic during a car crash
Constable John Zivcic	Toronto Police Service	Toronto, Ontario	December 2, 2013	Died in the hospital after a car accident that occurred while on duty
Constable Dave Joseph Ross	RCMP (Codiac)	Moncton, New Brunswick	June 4, 2014	Killed during the 2014 Moncton shootings
Constable Douglas James Larche	RCMP (Codiac)	Moncton, New Brunswick	June 4, 2014	Killed during the 2014 Moncton shootings
Constable Fabrice Georges Gevaudan	RCMP (Codiac)	Moncton, New Brunswick	June 4, 2014	Killed during the 2014 Moncton shootings
Constable David Wynn	RCMP (St. Albert)	St. Albert, Alberta	January 21, 2015	Cst. Wynn was shot in the head by Shawn Rehn at the Apex Casino, while trying to apprehend him for vehicle theft.
Officer Toni Kristinsson	British Columbia Commercial Vehicle Safety and Enforcement	near Valemount, British Columbia	February 1, 2015	Killed in a collision with a commercial transport truck
Constable Dan Woodall	Edmonton Police Service	Edmonton, Alberta	June 8, 2015	Cst. Woodall and his partner were executing an arrest warrant against Norman Raddatz, when they were fired at through the door of the house as they approached it. Injuring his partner, Cst. Harley, and killing Cst. Woodall. A gunfight with Raddatz ensued, during which, he set his house on fire and committed suicide. Woodall was married with two sons.
Constable Thierry Leroux	Lac-Simon Police Force	Lac-Simon, Quebec	February 13, 2016	Shot and killed while responding to a domestic disturbance. The perpetrator was found deceased from a self-inflicted gunshot.
Constable Sarah Beckett	RCMP (West Shore)	Langford, British Columbia	April 5, 2016	Killed after her police car was hit by a pickup truck at an intersection
Constable Richer Dubuc	RCMP Integrated Border Enforcement Team	Saint-Jean-sur-Richelieu, Quebec	March 6, 2017	Killed after losing control of his vehicle while on patrol
Constable Francis Deschenes	RCMP Northern Corridor Traffic Services	near Memramcook, New Brunswick	September 12, 2017	Hit by a utility van and killed while assisting motorists in changing a flat tire.
Constable John Davidson	Abbotsford Police Department	Abbotsford, British Columbia	November 6, 2017	A vehicle was recognized as stolen at a mall, leading to citizens boxing it in with other cars to prevent the suspect from escaping as they called 911. The suspect then began shooting at the caller while they were on the line as well as others at the mall. When police arrived, a gun fight ensued and Cst. Davidson what fatally shot. The man was arrested and charged with first degree murder.
Constable Ian Jordan	Victoria Police Department	Victoria, British Columbia	April 11, 2018	On September 22, 1987, a miscommunication led to a collision at the police department which left Cst. Jordan with a serious brain injury that he never regained conscious from. He was in comatose for 30 years before he died.
Constable Lawrence Robert Costello	Fredericton Police Force	Fredericton, New Brunswick	August 10, 2018	Killed during a shooting in Fredericton
Constable Sara Burns	Fredericton Police Force	Fredericton, New Brunswick	August 10, 2018	Killed during a shooting in Fredericton
Constable Allan Poapst	RCMP (Manitoba)	Winnipeg, Manitoba	December 13, 2019	Killed when a pickup truck crossed the median and collided with his patrol vehicle on the Perimeter Highway.

=== 2020s ===
2020s

Name and rank	Agency	Location	Date	Details
Constable Heidi Stevenson	RCMP	Shubenacadie, Nova Scotia	April 18, 2020	Gabriel Wortman shot two RCMP officers, killing one, and killed 21 other people in Canada's deadliest spree shootings to date
Constable Joan VanBreda	Niagara Regional Police Service	St. Catharines, Ontario	May 22, 2020	Cst. VanBreda was struck by a drunk driver while crossing a roadway on September 24th, 1986. She died in 2020 as a result.
Constable Mark Hovingh	Ontario Provincial Police	Gore Bay, Ontario	November 19, 2020	Cst. Hovigh was responding to a call about a trespasser alongside another officer when the suspect shot and killed him. The suspect was also shot and died in the hospital soon after.
Sergeant Andrew Harnett	Calgary Police Service	Calgary, Alberta	December 31, 2020	Sgt. Harnett was killed after being intentionally hit by a vehicle fleeing a traffic stop. Despite immediate first aid by nearby officers, Harnett was pronounced dead at the hospital. Both perpetrators were minors at the time, so their identities were not made public.
Constable Shelby Patton	RCMP (Saskatchewan)	Wolseley, Saskatchewan	June 12, 2021	During a traffic stop, Cst. Patton was hit and killed by a stolen vehicle driven by Alphonse Traverse with passenger Marlene Pagee. Both were later apprehended, with Traverse pleading guilty to manslaughter in 2023 and Pagee pleading guilty to accessory after the fact in 2024.
Constable Jeffrey Northrup	Toronto Police Service	Toronto, Ontario	July 2, 2021	Cst. Northrup was hit by a vehicle while investigating a disturbance in a parking garage and was pronounced dead shortly after arrival at the hospital. Northrup was married with three kids.
Constable Andrew Hong	Toronto Police Service	Mississauga, Ontario	September 12, 2022	Cst. Hong was shot and killed by 40-year-old Sean Petrie while eating lunch in a Tim Horton's after a training exercise. Petrie had been waiting in the Tim Horton's for over two hours for a police officer to ambush. Petrie then fled in a stolen car, driving to an Auto-body shop where he killed mechanic Shakeel Ashraf and international student Satwinder Singh and injured five others. Petrie then fled to Hamilton where he was killed by police in Mount Hamilton Cemetery.
Constable Morgan Russell	South Simcoe Police Service	Innisfil, Ontario	October 12, 2022	Cst. Russell and Cst. Northrup were shot and killed by a lone male suspect after responding to a disturbance call at a home. A third officer exchanged fire with the suspect, who was killed. Russell was a trained crisis negotiator with a wife and two daughters. Northup was part of the police forces mental health crisis outreach team.
Constable Devon Northrup	South Simcoe Police Service	Innisfil, Ontario	October 12, 2022	Cst. Russell and Cst. Northrup were shot and killed by a lone male suspect after responding to a disturbance call at a home. A third officer exchanged fire with the suspect, who was killed. Russell was a trained crisis negotiator with a wife and two daughters. Northup was part of the police forces mental health crisis outreach team.
Constable Shaelyn Yang	RCMP (Burnaby)	Burnaby, British Columbia	October 18, 2022	Cst. Yang, part of RCMP Burnaby's mental health and homeless outreach team, was conducting a welfare check on a lone resident in a tent when she found him possibly unconscious and overdosing inside. When Cst. Yang entered the tent to try to help him, he woke up and began to attack her. During the attack, the man stabbed Cst. Yang in the chest. She later succumbed to her injuries in the hospital.
Constable Grzegorz Pierzchala	Ontario Provincial Police	near Hagersville, Ontario	December 27, 2022	Cst. Pierzchala was ambushed and killed by Randall McKenzie and Brandi Stewart-Sperry as he exited his vehicle while responding to a call about a vehicle in the ditch. After the shooting the two then fled in a vehicle they stole from a good samaritan who had stopped to offer help. There were later apprehend and convicted with First Degree murder.
Constable Brett Ryan	Edmonton Police Service	Edmonton, Alberta	March 16, 2023	Constables Brett Ryan and Travis Jordan were ambushed and killed when they responded to a domestic dispute call involving a young male and his mother. Both officers were shot multiple times while they were entering the house, the suspect then shot and wounded his mother before killing himself. No mention of firearms in the house was made during the 911 call or while talking to the officers at the scene. Brett's wife was pregnant with their first child at the time. Cst. Jordan had been married for over 8 years at the time of his death.
Constable Travis Jordan	Edmonton Police Service	Edmonton, Alberta	March 16, 2023	
Sergeant Maureen Breau	Sûreté du Québec	Louiseville, Quebec	March 27, 2023	Sgt. Breau was killed after a suspect she and her partner were arresting stabbed her with a large blade, causing her to fall two stories to the ground. Her partner was also injured but recovered. The suspect was then shot and killed by a backup officer.
Constable Harvinder Singh Dhami	RCMP (Strathcona County)	near Sherwood Park, Alberta	April 10, 2023	Cst. Dhami died after losing control of his vehicle and striking a concrete barrier while on his way to help other officers with a noise complaint.
Sergeant Eric Mueller	Ontario Provincial Police	Bourget, Ontario	May 11, 2023	Sgt. Mueller was shot and killed and two other officers were injured in a shooting at a house after responding to a call about the sound of gunshots and screams coming from a house.
Detective Constable Steven Tourangeau	Ontario Provincial Police	near Woodstock, Ontario	May 29, 2023	Killed in a double-fatal traffic accident while on duty
Constable Rick O'Brien	RCMP (Ridge Meadows)	Maple Ridge, British Columbia	September 22, 2023	Cst. O'Brien was shot and killed by 25-year-old Nicholas Bellemare while executing a search warrant for a drug-related investigation. Bellemare also shot and wounded two other officers.
Sergeant Anaïs Fortin-Cozzens	Sûreté du Québec	Portneuf-sur-Mer, Quebec	March 31, 2026	Died in hospital following a vehicle crash.
Sergeant Brandon Malcolm	Ontario Provincial Police	Cobourg, Ontario	April 27, 2026	Sgt. Malcolm was killed in an on-duty motorcycle crash on Highway 401.
Constable Tarun Bali	Ontario Provincial Police	near Hearst, Ontario	June 9, 2026	Cst. Bali was fatally wounded when a man who had escaped a hospital struck him with his vehicle.
Constable Marc Pinizzotto	Toronto Police Service	Toronto, Ontario	June 11, 2026	Shot and killed by a 19-year-old Zara Jabbi during a raid that was connected to the US Consulate shooting. Zara is believed to be connected to the Iranian terrorist group Kata'ib Hezbollah.
Constable Mohamed Lamine Benredouane	Montreal Police	Montreal, Quebec	June 22, 2026	Killed in the line of duty on June 22, 2026, during an armed confrontation in the Côte-des-Neiges neighborhood. He and a civilian, 68-year-old Michael Mizrahi, were both shot and killed by a heavily armed suspect who had also published a violent manifesto.

== Deaths outside of Canada ==
The following is a list of Canadian law enforcement officers who died outside of Canada, not during wartime or during peacekeeping operations.

Law enforcement deaths that occurred outside of Canada

Name and rank	Agency	Location	Date	Details
Constable Adam Wahl	NWMP	Missouri River, Montana, United States	May 25, 1882	Drowned as a new recruit while en route to Fort Walsh
Constable William Boyd	Constable of York County	Aurora, Illinois, United States	June 4, 1901	While transporting prisoners to Chicago, a stranger threw 3 revolvers in the cab, leading to a gunfight that resulted in the death of Cst. Boyd.
Constable Norman Malcolm Campbell	NWMP	Stikine River, District of Alaska, United States	December 26, 1901	Drowned while on patrol
Constable Spencer Gilbert Heathcote	NWMP	Stikine River, District of Alaska, United States	December 26, 1901	Drowned while on patrol
Constable Charles James Johnstone	RCMP	Atlantic Ocean	May 1, 1941	Killed when the British passenger ship SS Nerissa was torpedoed by a German U-boat
Corporal Harold Morrison Bettenson	Canadian Forces Military Police	near Aurich, British occupation zone (present day Germany)	June 24, 1945	Died when his truck struck a tree in foggy weather
Acting Sergeant Hubert Edward Popkey	Canadian Forces Military Police	The Netherlands	July 1, 1945	Died in a vehicle collision
Sergeant Edward Sombert	Canadian Forces Military Police	Hengelo, The Netherlands	August 5, 1945	Died in a vehicle accident
Sergeant William Marshall Wilson	Canadian Forces Military Police	Aldershot, United Kingdom	August 5, 1945	Died in an on-duty traffic accident
Lance Corporal William Hector Matheson	Canadian Forces Military Police	near Gronau, British occupation zone (present day Germany)	September 4, 1945	Died in a truck collision
Private Alexander Robert McFeat	Canadian Forces Military Police	The Netherlands	September 19, 1945	Died in a vehicle collision
Private Walter Melnychenko	Canadian Forces Military Police	The Netherlands	September 19, 1945	Died in a vehicle collision
Lance Corporal Robert John Walter Driscoll	Canadian Forces Military Police	Scheveningen, The Netherlands	November 9, 1945	Died in the hospital following a motorcycle accident
Sergeant Alexander Hope Matthew	Canadian Forces Military Police	The Netherlands	November 12, 1945	Died in a motor vehicle accident
Lance Corporal Donald Oscar Robertson	Canadian Forces Military Police	Varel, British occupation zone (present day Germany)	January 1, 1946	Accidentally shot himself
Lance Corporal Leicester Welch Gay	Canadian Forces Military Police	Surrey, United Kingdom	July 3, 1946	Died in a truck accident
Lance Corporal William Lawrence Stewart	Canadian Forces Military Police	United Kingdom	September 2, 1946	Died in a vehicle accident
Constable Herschel Taylor Wood	RCMP	Glacier Park, Montana, United States	July 16, 1950	Died in a traffic accident while on duty
Corporal Bernard A. Heinzman	Canadian Forces Military Police	near Hanover, West Germany	March 15, 1955	Died during a military maneuver
Corporal Joseph M. Bernard	Canadian Forces Military Police	Soest, West Germany	November 26, 1959	Died in an automobile accident
Leading Aircraftsman Charles A. May	Canadian Forces Military Police	near Longwy, France	October 5, 1963	Died in a car accident that killed 2 others
Sergeant Douglas G. Carter	Canadian Forces Security Branch	West Germany	October 15, 1971	Killed after being hit by a tank while doing traffic control during a blackout exercise
Corporal Donald Irwin	Ontario Provincial Police	Deerfield Beach, Florida, United States	February 20, 1976	Cp. Irwin was participating in a ride-along with a friend, Trooper Phillip Black of the Florida Highway Patrol. During a traffic stop a suspect in the car opened fire killing Trooper Black. When Cpl. Irwin intervened, he was also fatally shot.
Corporal Derek Flanagan	RCMP	Thailand	February 20, 1989	Killed in an intentional vehicle strike during an undercover operation
Master Corporal Gérald-Rock Roleau	Canadian Forces Security Guard Unit	Algiers, Algeria	October 8, 2001	Died while working at the Canadian Embassy, in a non-specified way related to his service
Corporal Brendan Anthony Downey	Canadian Forces Military Police	Camp Mirage, United Arab Emirates	July 4, 2008	Cpl. Downey was found dead in the sleeping quarters in a manner that has not been disclosed. The investigation into his death has not been resolved.

== Gallery ==
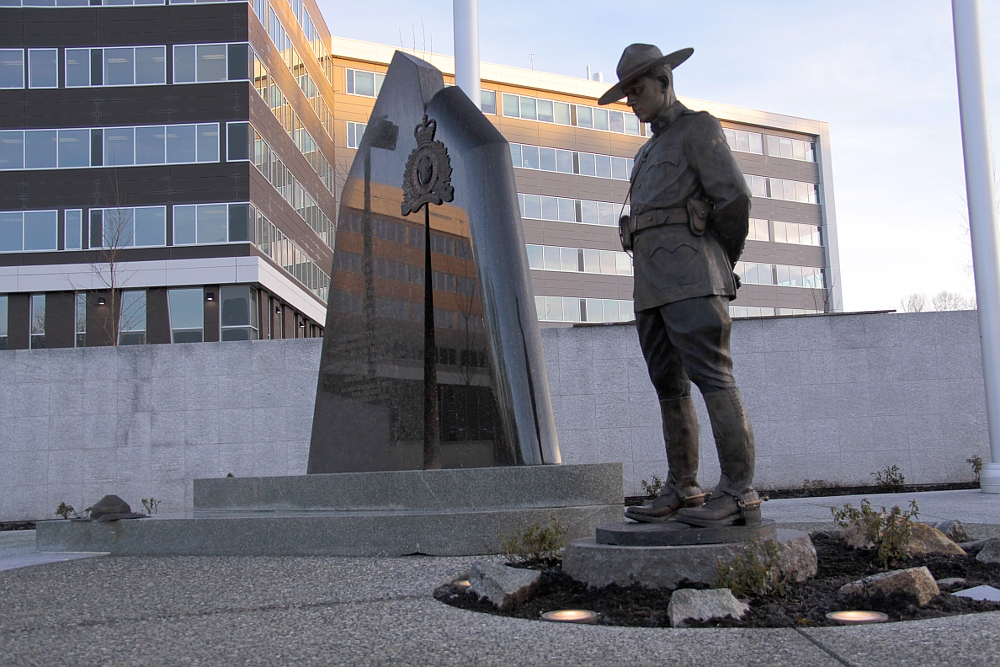
Police memorial in Surrey, British Columbia

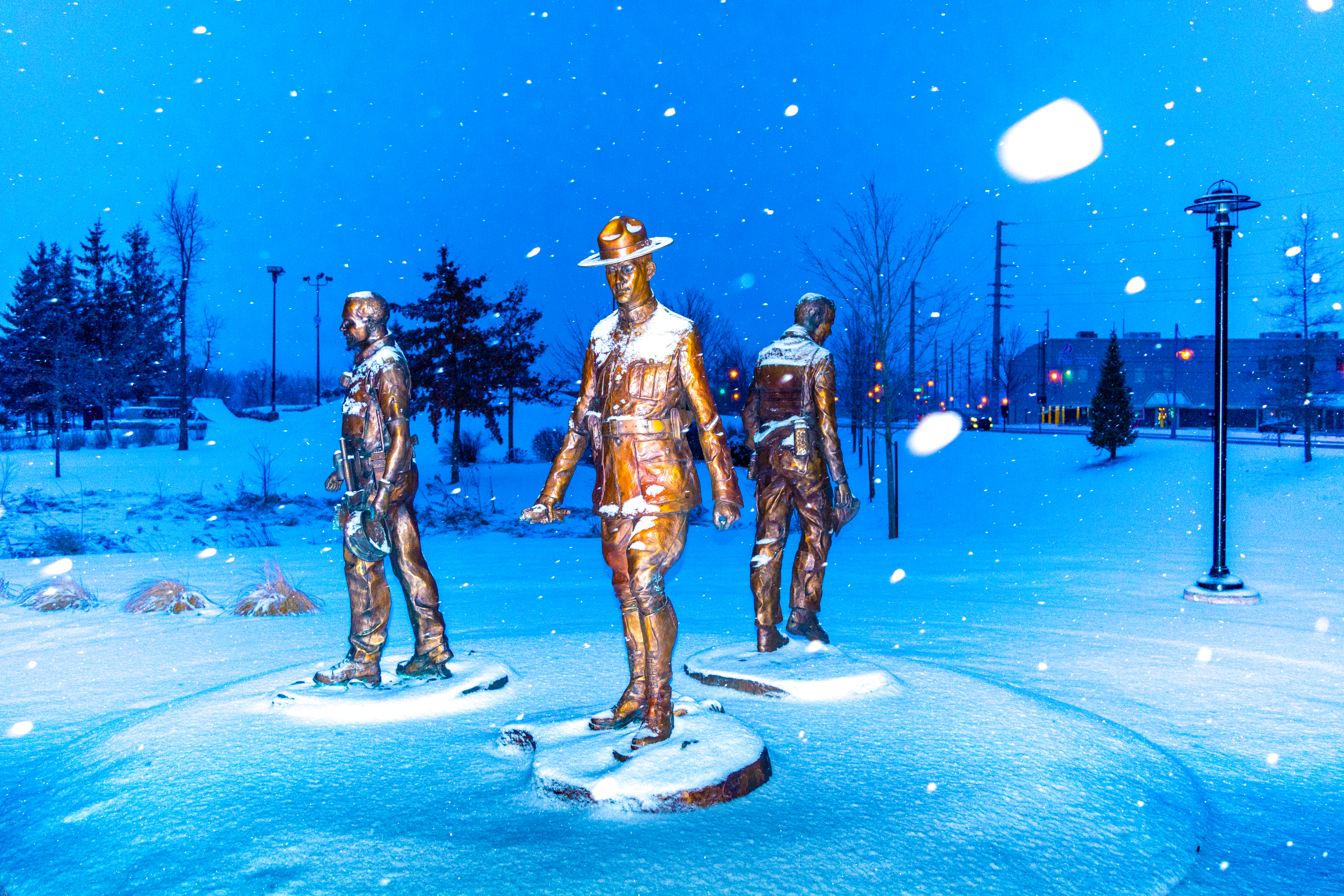
Memorial in Moncton for those killed in the 2014 Moncton shootings

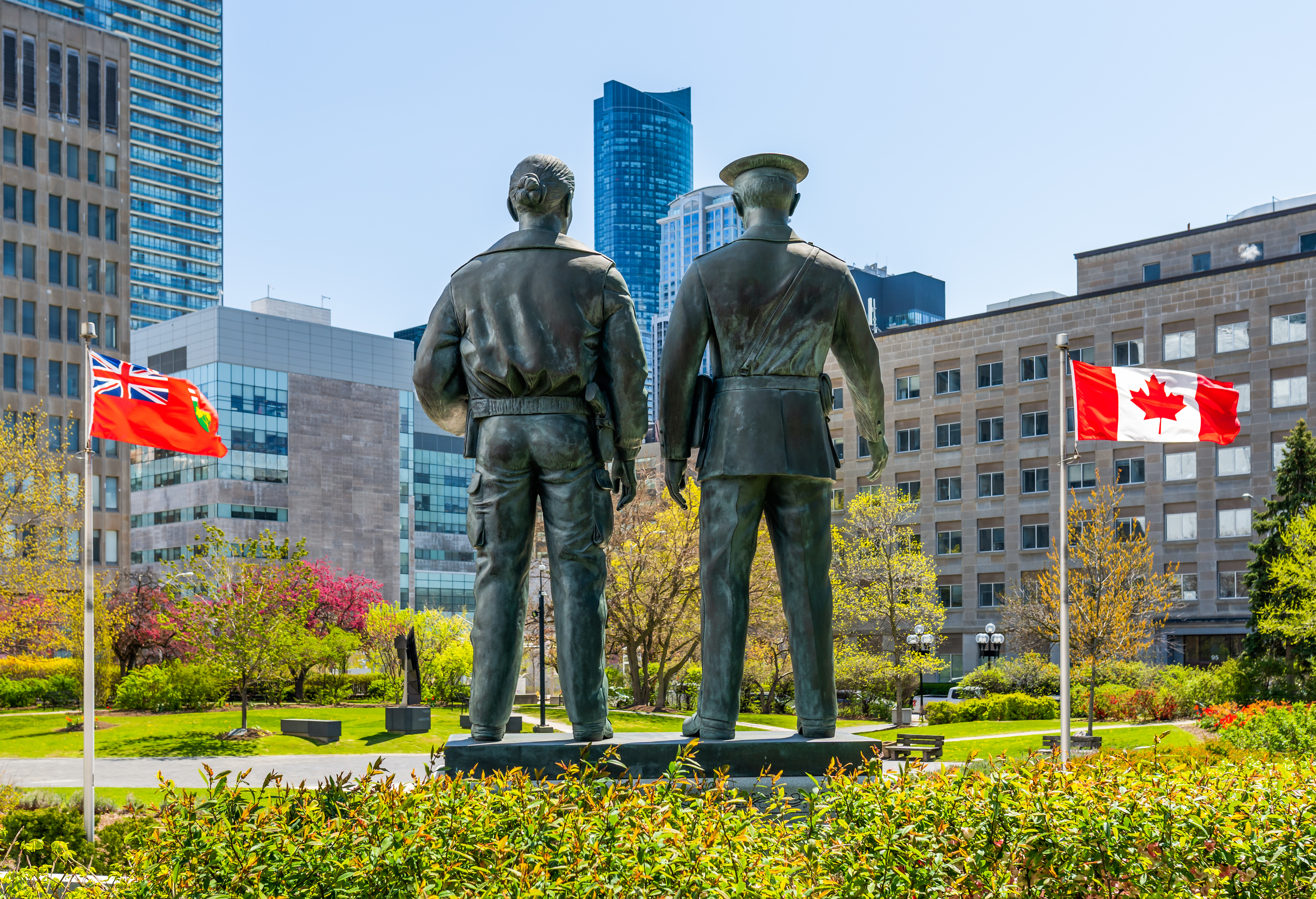
Ontario Police Memorial in Toronto

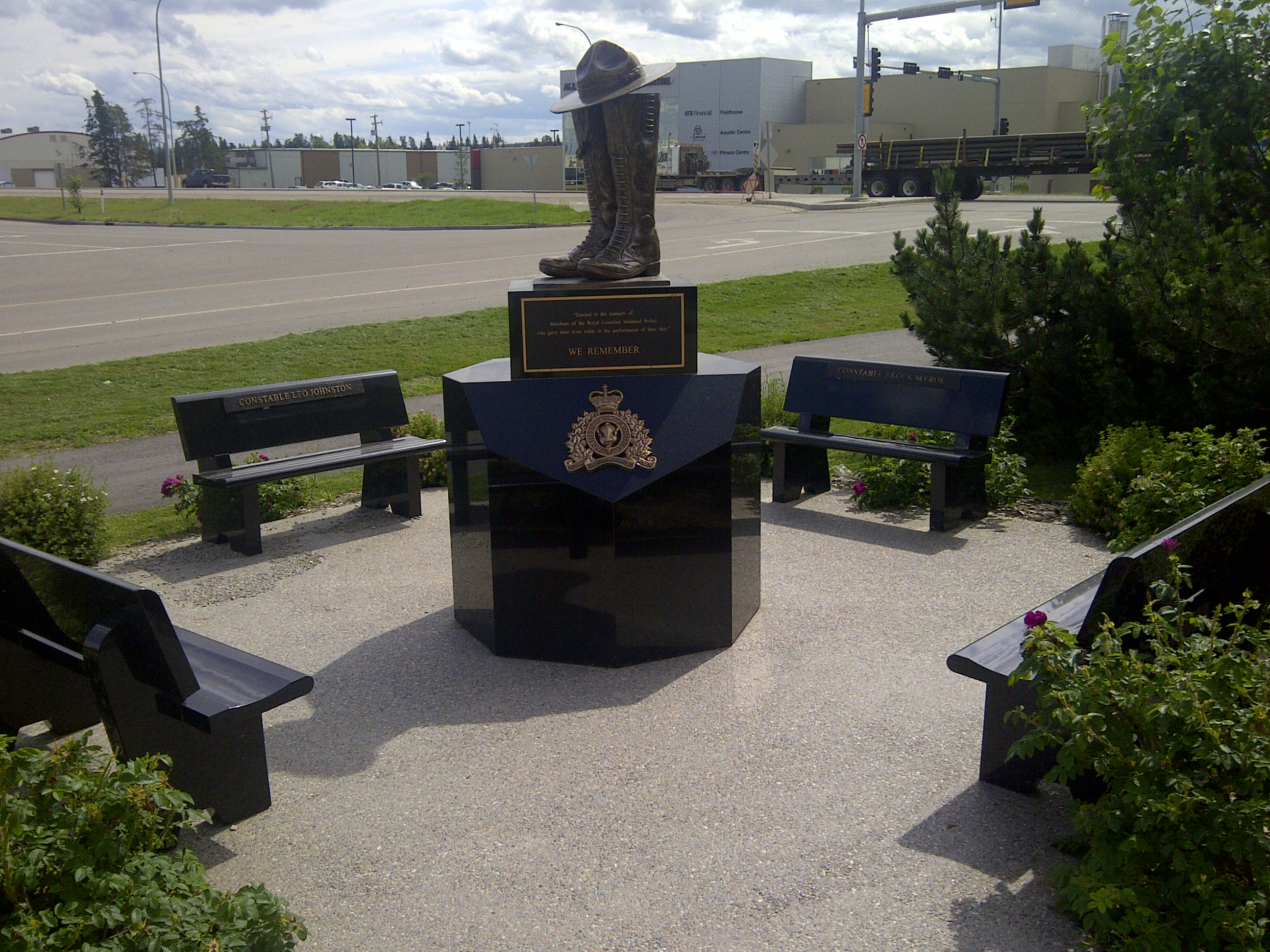
Mayerthorpe tragedy memorial in Whitecourt, Alberta

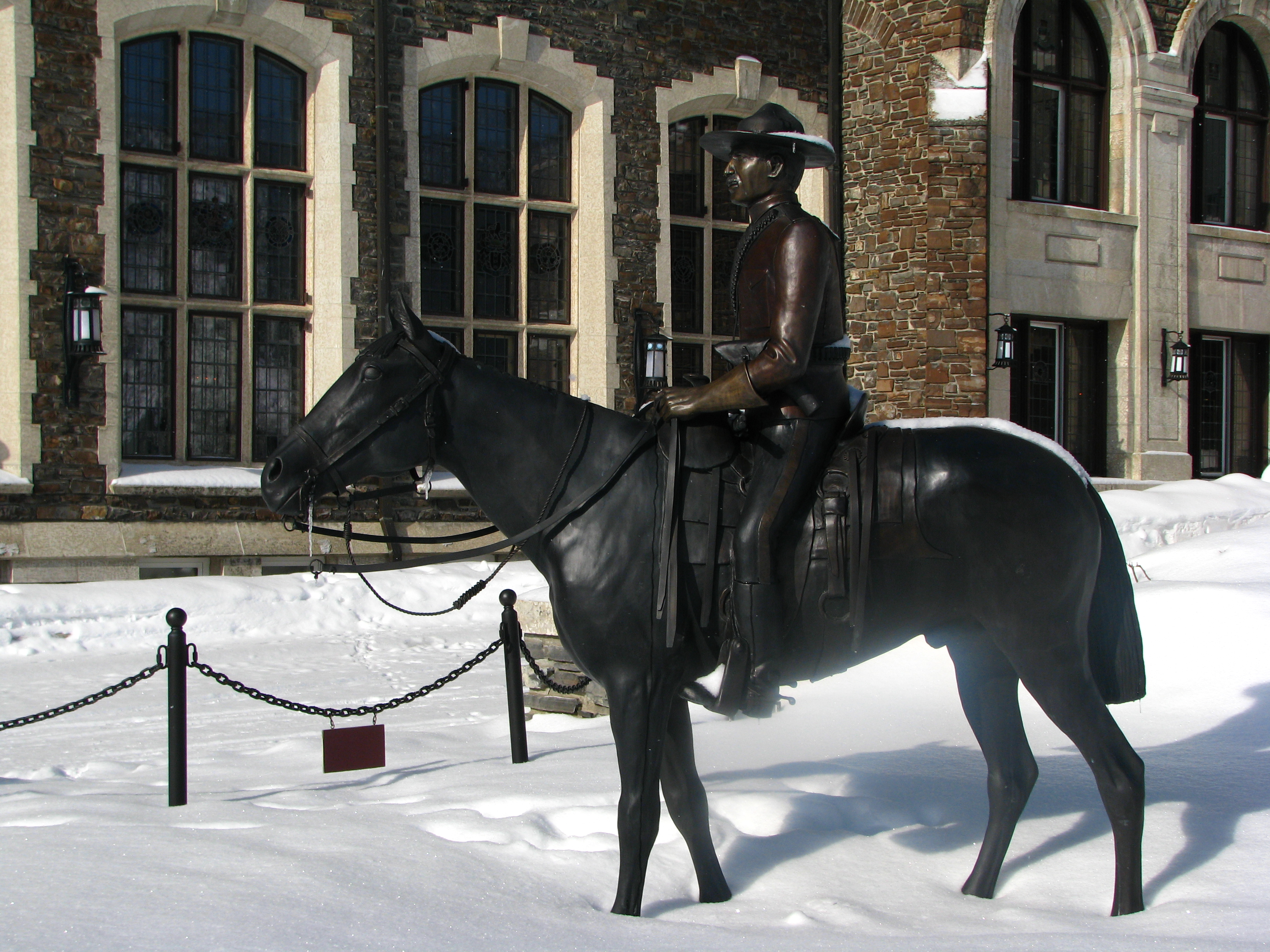
RCMP Memorial in Banff, Alberta

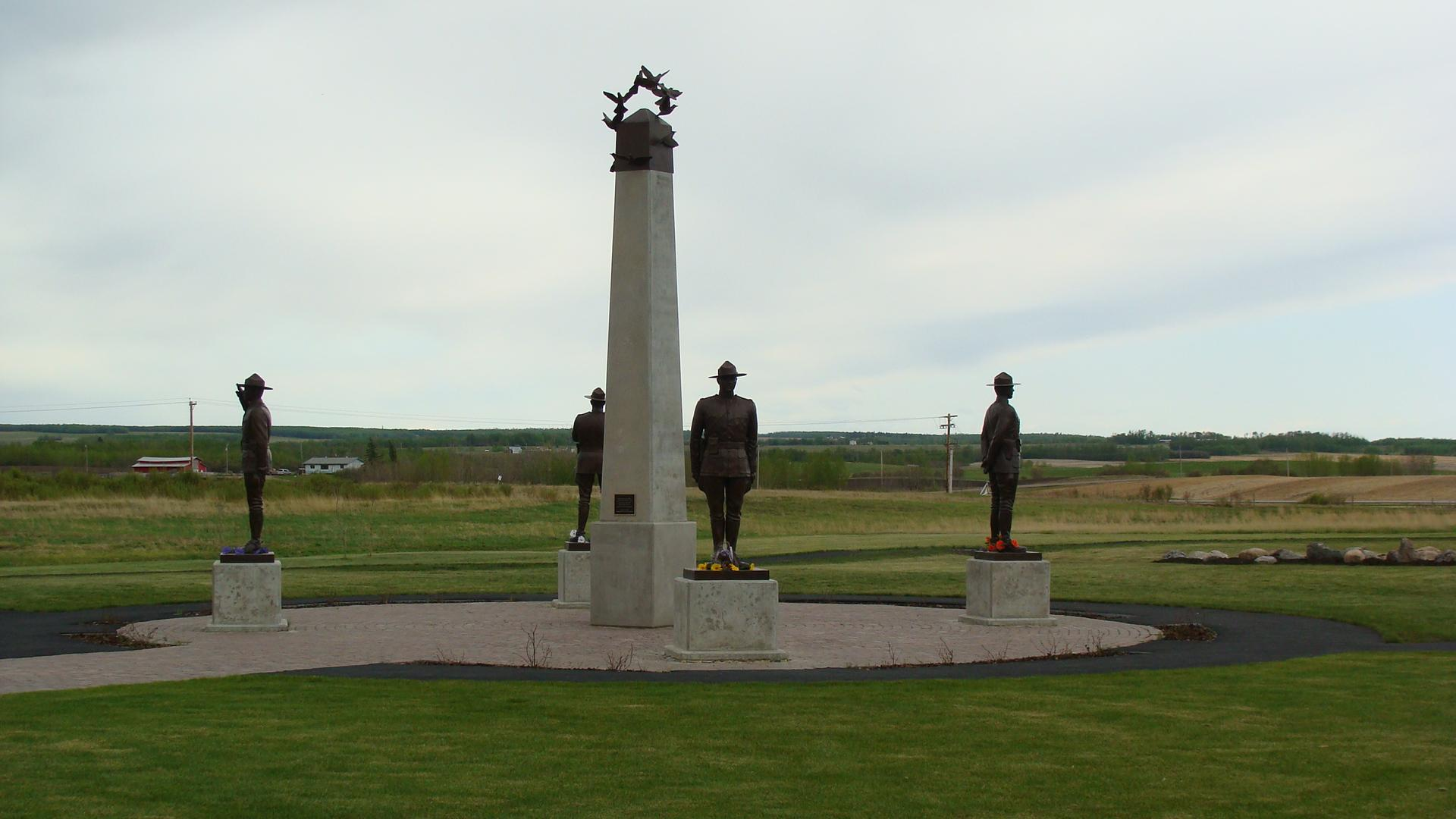
Fallen Four Memorial in Mayerthorpe, Alberta

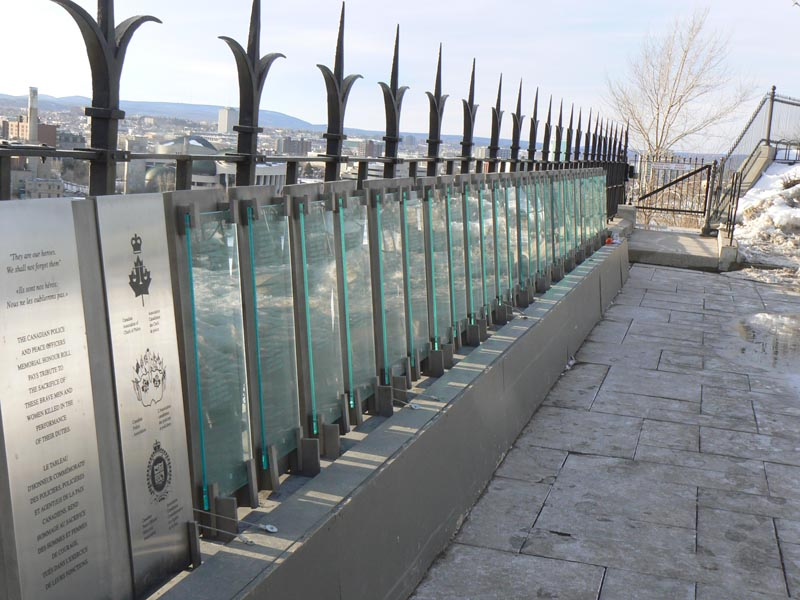
Parliament Hill police memorial

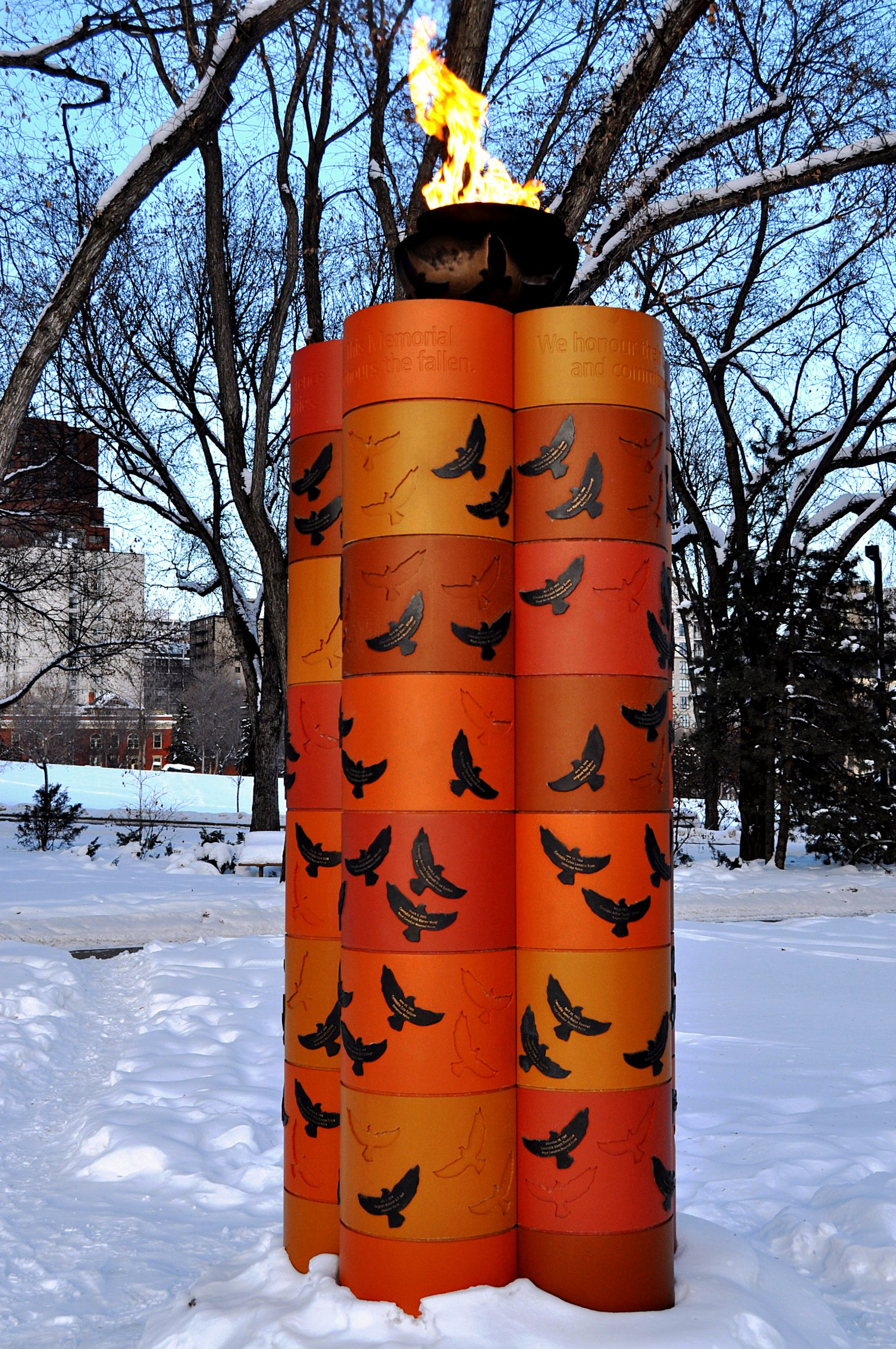
Alberta Police and Peace Officers' Memorial in Edmonton

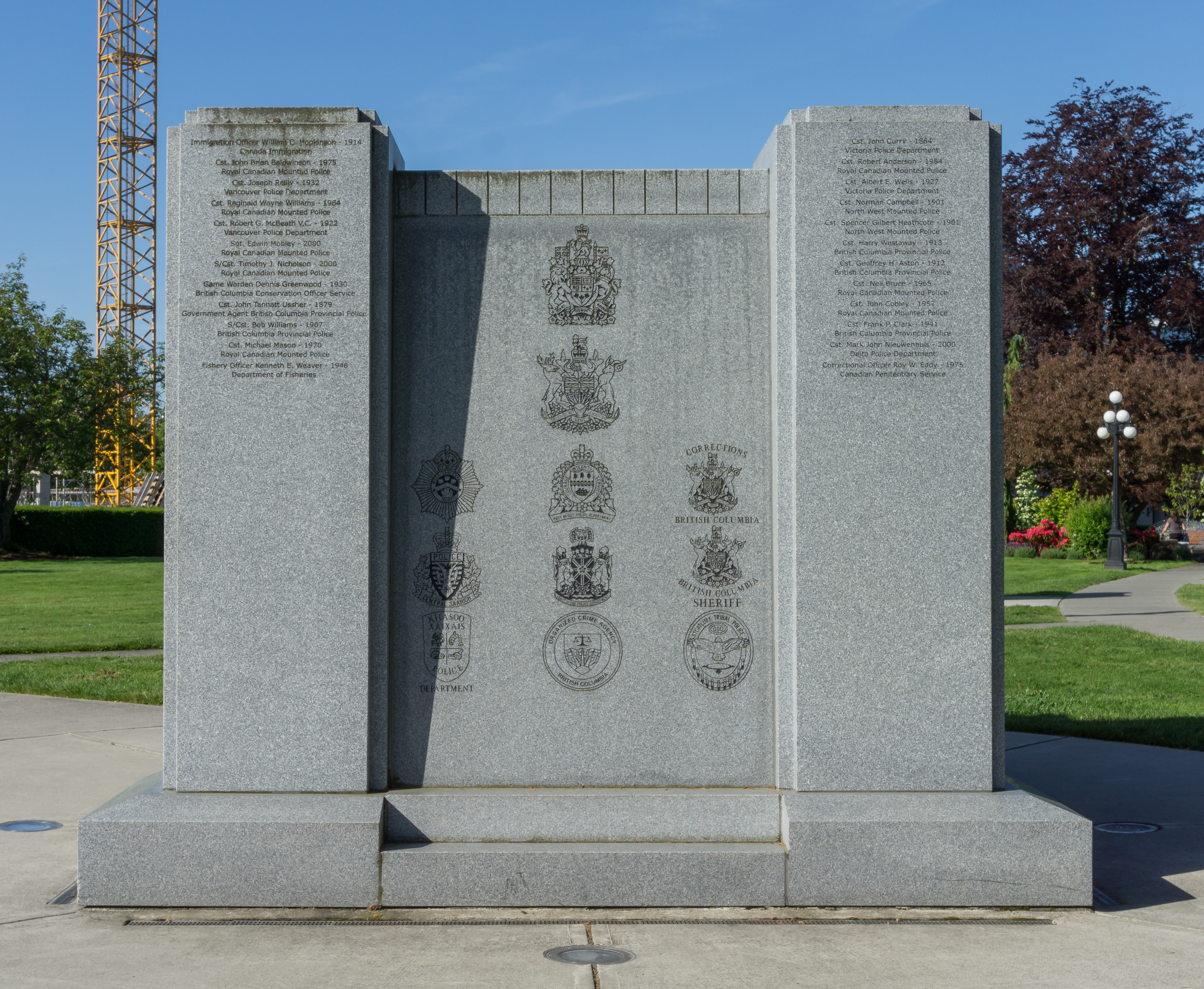
British Columbia Law Enforcement Memorial in Victoria, British Columbia

== See also ==
- List of Canadian correctional workers who have died in the line of duty
- List of law enforcement agencies in Canada
- List of law enforcement officers killed in the line of duty in the United States
- List of British police officers killed in the line of duty

=== Incidents with multiple policemen killed ===
- Mayerthorpe Tragedy
- Spiritwood Incident
- 2018 Fredericton shooting
- 2014 Moncton shootings
- 1935 Royal Canadian Mounted Police Killings
- Bellevue Café shootout
- Dawson-McPherson Lost Patrol
