= Killing of Nooran Rezayi =

The Killing of Nooran Rezayi occurred on 21 September, 2025 in the Montreal suburb of Longueuil. The 15-year old was shot by the Service de police de l'agglomération de Longueuil (SPAL) in Saint-Hubert.

== Nooran Rezayi ==
The Rezayi family emigrated from Afghanistan to Quebec prior to Nooran's birth.

== Shooting ==
According to public information, officers were responding to a call reporting armed individuals. However, the Bureau des enquêtes indépendantes (BEI) confirmed that no firearm was found on the teenager.

== Legal proceedings ==
Two civil lawsuits have been filed. In December 2025, the victim's family sought $2.2 million in damages, alleging "unreasonable and disproportionate" use of force. In March 2026, five teenage witnesses and their mothers filed a $1.9 million lawsuit, alleging negligence, a failure to de-escalate, and psychological harm.

The City of Longueuil is also named as a defendant, notably due to its liability for the actions of its police officers and allegations of racial profiling.

== Investigations ==
Several investigations are ongoing. The Bureau des enquêtes indépendantes submitted its report to the Directeur des poursuites criminelles et pénales (DPCP), which must decide whether to lay charges. The Service de police de la Ville de Montréal is investigating the events that preceded the intervention. The ministère de la Sécurité publique du Québec is conducting an administrative review of the delays between the events and the BEI's arrival on scene.

In June 2026, the Service de police de la Ville de Montréal (SPVM) announced that 11 teenagers, aged 13 to 17 at the time of the events, were facing charges in connection with the events that preceded the police intervention. Five were arrested, while the others were charged by way of summons. The charges include conspiracy to kidnap, conspiracy to unlawfully confine, carrying a weapon for a dangerous purpose, unlawful assembly, and concealment of identity. According to reporting by La Presse, the suspects had reportedly planned to abduct and assault a young person amid a conflict between groups. Authorities specified that these charges relate to events that preceded the police intervention and do not concern the decision to shoot the teenager, which remains under investigation by the Bureau des enquêtes indépendantes.

As of 1 July 2026, two independent reports are still pending in the investigation into the police intervention that led to the death of Nooran Rezayi.

== See also ==
- Death of Abisay Cruz
- Killing of Anthony Griffin
- Killing of Fredy Villanueva
- Racial profiling
- Police brutality
