= Killing of Fredy Villanueva =

Shooting in Montreal, Canada (2008)

Death of Fredy Villanueva
- Date: August 9, 2008
- Time: 7:00 p.m.
- Location: Parc Henri-Bourassa, Montréal-Nord, Quebec, Canada
- Participants: Constable Jean-Loup Lapointe (shooter)
- Deaths: Fredy Villanueva
- Injuries: Jeffrey Sagor Météllus, Denis Méas
- Charges: None filed

The shooting of Fredy Alberto Villanueva occurred on August 9, 2008, in Montreal, Quebec, Canada. Villanueva, a Honduran immigrant, was shot and killed by a Montreal Police officer in the parking lot of Montreal-Nord's Henri-Bourassa Arena, near Rolland Boulevard and Pascal Street, just after 7:00 p.m. Two other men were injured in the shooting. No criminal charges were filed against the officers involved. Villanueva's death led to protests in Montreal.

== Background ==
Fredy Alberto Villanueva was born on April 6, 1990 in Honduras, and was 18 at the time of his death. Villanueva arrived in Quebec with his older brother, Dany, and his three sisters (Patricia, Wendy, and Lilian) on December 5, 1998. They joined their parents (Gilberto Villanueva Madrid and Lilian), who were in Canada with refugee status after leaving Honduras. Gilberto Villanueva had survived two attempted murders related to a land conflict.

Villanueva had no criminal record. According to Pierre-Yves Boisvert, SPVM (Service de police de la ville de Montréal) counsel to the inquest, he was not identified as a street gang member.

== Incident ==
Villanueva, his brother Dany, and three other men were playing dice in a parking lot when two patrolling constables, Jean-Loup Lapointe and Stéphanie Pilotte, approached them. The stated reason for the police action was that gambling with money is prohibited in Montreal North parks. The constables identified some of those present as local gang members, including a known member of the Bloods street gang, named Jeffrey Sagor Météllus, as well as another street gang member recognized by Lapointe. Lapointe stopped his car and called the men over. All complied with his order except for Dany Villanueva, who instead began to walk away. At that point, Lapointe left his cruiser and ordered Dany to identify himself. He refused, and Lapointe then tried to take him into custody. He later said he was concerned that he might be armed.

Lapointe said that some of the men shouted in protest and began to form a line behind the officers. He said he felt "surrounded and confined against his car." Lapointe said that Dany Villanueva fought back, forcing the officer to push him to the ground. Pilotte was subsequently kicked several times, and Lapointe was punched in the face. Lapointe then noticed the other four men moving in on him. Two of them appeared to be reaching toward his neck and his belt, where his holstered gun was located. One of the men grabbed Lapointe's neck and he realized that his partner "was not in a position to come to (his) defence... and (he) was not physically capable of overcoming these men." The men were ordered to back up but refused, and Lapointe said that he "saw no other alternative than to fire immediately."

Lapointe said his concern about the threat of being disarmed was so great that he shot his gun "three or four times" before he was able to remove it from its holster. One gunshot struck Fredy. Jeffrey Sagor Météllus and another man, Denis Méas, were also struck and injured. Only a minute had passed from the officers exiting their vehicle to the shots being fired.

Villanueva was seriously injured. Two bullets hit his internal organs, perforating the stomach and causing lacerations to the inferior vena cava, liver left lobe, and pancreas. He was pronounced dead in the operating room at Hôpital Sacré-Coeur at 21:45.

At 10:00 PM, the SPVM issued a press release in which it said: "Around 7:10 p.m., police patrolling the Montreal North sector intervened in Henri-Bourassa Park at the intersection of Pascal and Rolland streets. During the intervention, while trying to arrest a suspect at the scene, police were encircled by several individuals. At one point, a group movement was initiated with a number of men rushing the male and female police officers, assaulting them. The male officer then fired towards the suspects, hitting three of them; one was wounded fatally."

Constable Pilotte had graduated from the province’s police academy 18 months before the shooting.

== Coroner's inquest ==
On December 1, 2008, the Director of Criminal and Penal Prosecutions (DCPP), Louis Dionne, held a press conference in the company of the Minister of Justice and Public Security, Jacques Dupuis, and Mayor Gérald Tremblay. Dionne announced that no charges were brought against the officers Lapointe and Pilotte. Crown Prosecutor François Brière particularly cited several excerpts of the report of Lapointe to explain how the DCPP had reached that conclusion.

For his part, Minister Dupuis announced the holding of a public inquiry, chaired by Judge of the Court of Québec Robert Sansfaçon coroner appointed for the occasion. Minister Dupuis said that the inquest was designed to "reassure the population about the merits of the decision that was taken by the Crown prosecutor."

The decision not to charge against the police was greeted with disappointment by the Villanueva family. "We wanted to have confidence in the judicial process, but now we do not know what to think," said Patricia Villanueva.

"I am shocked, shocked, but not surprised. There is a justice for police officers and for citizens. It was the trial of Villanueva, not the police," denounced Will Prosper, a Montreal-Nord Republik spokesman.

For his part, the president of the FPPM (Montreal Police Brotherhood), Yves Francoeur, responded positively to the decision of the DCPP. "The police will keep a high level of confidence in the justice system," he said. Francoeur also welcomed the decision to hold an inquest. The movement "Solidarity Montreal North" (a group represented by a city-linked PR firm) also reacted positively, distributing to the media a statement supporting the holding of the inquest, even before the end press conference of DCPP.

== Aftermath ==
During a protest against the officers' actions, riot police were dispatched after bonfires had been set in the streets of Montreal North on August 10 in retaliation to the event. The protest would escalate to looting and car torching. One paramedic and two police officers were wounded, and one female police officer was shot. Seventy-one people were arrested.

The death provoked the Quebec government to reform how police shootings are investigated in the province.

The Canada Border Services Agency had attempted to deport Villanueva before his death.

A judge ended a seven-year civil suit involving the families of Villanueva and the other two injured. Quebec Superior Court Judge William Fraiberg ruled that the families' lawyers had failed too many times to meet deadlines, which caused unjustified delays.

The event was one of the inspirations behind Sophie Deraspe's 2019 film Antigone, which adapted the ancient Greek play by Sophocles into a modern story of police brutality against immigrants.

== See also ==
- Death of Abisay Cruz
- Killing of Anthony Griffin
- Killing of Nooran Rezayi
