= Crémazie =

Crémazie may refer to:

- Crémazie (Montreal Metro)
- Crémazie (electoral district)
- Octave Crémazie (1827–1879), poet
- Octave Crémazie Monument
