= Afghan Canadians =

Community of Canadians of Afghan descent or with Afghan citizenship

Pashto: د کاناډا افغانان Dari: کاناداها افغان تبر

Total population
- 135,000

Regions with significant populations
- Greater Toronto Area, Montreal, Vancouver, Edmonton

Languages
- Pashto, Dari, other Afghan languages, Canadian English

Religion
- Predominantly: Islam (92.44%); Minorities: Irreligion (5.6%); Christianity (1.1%); Hinduism (0.5%); Sikhism (0.2%); Judaism (0.04%); Buddhism (0.01%); Indigenous (0.01%); Others (0.1%) (Note: Religious breakdown proportions based on "Afghan" ethnic or cultural origin response on the 2021 census.)

Afghan Canadians (Note: Pashto: د کاناډا افغانان Dari: کاناداها افغان تبر) are Canadians with ancestry from Afghanistan. They form the second largest Afghan community in North America after Afghan Americans. Their ethnic origin may come from any of the ethnic groups of Afghanistan, which include Pashtun, Tajik, Uzbek, Hazara, Turkmen, etc. In the Canada 2016 Census about 83,995 Canadians were from Afghanistan.

== History ==
The first known Afghan immigrant to Canada was Zaman Khan (Pashto: زمان خان) who was naturalised in Montreal, QC on 27 January 1931.

== Demography ==
=== Population ===
Afghan−Canadian Population History
Year	Pop.	±%
2016	83,995	—
2021	96,810	+15.3%
Source: Statistics Canada

=== Religion ===
Afghan Canadian demography by religion
Religious group	2021	
Religious group	Pop.	%
Islam	89,485	92.44%
Irreligion	5,400	5.58%
Christianity	1,035	1.07%
Hinduism	465	0.48%
Sikhism	235	0.24%
Judaism	40	0.04%
Buddhism	10	0.01%
Indigenous spirituality	10	0.01%
Other	135	0.14%
Total Afghan Canadian population	96,810	100%

== Geographical distribution ==
=== By Canadian province or territory (2016) ===
Province	Population	Percentage	Source
Ontario	54,535	0.4%	
Quebec	10,940	0.1%	
Alberta	8,545	0.2%	
British Columbia	7,890	0.2%	
Manitoba	1,015	0.1%	
Saskatchewan	780	0.1%	
Nova Scotia	230	0.0%	
New Brunswick	25	0.0%	
Newfoundland and Labrador	10	0.0%	
Prince Edward Island	10	0.0%	
Northwest Territories	10	0.0%	
Nunavut	0	0.0%	
Yukon	0	0.0%	
Canada	83,995	0.24%	

== Media ==
The diaspora also have media outlets for the Afghan community, including private TV channels such as Watan E Maa, AfghanJavan TV and Afghan Nobel TV.

== Notable individuals ==
- Kawa Ada – actor and playwright
- Brishkay Ahmed - documentary filmmaker
- Fardaws Aimaq – basketball player
- Layla Alizada – actress
- Alexander Farah – filmmaker
- Hangama – singer
- Donnie Keshawarz – actor
- Sadi Jalali – soccer player
- Nasser Jamal – football player
- Mozhdah Jamalzadah – singer
- Maryam Monsef – member of Parliament for Peterborough-Kawartha; first Afghan-Canadian elected to Canada's House of Commons, former Minister of Status of Women
- Farkhunda Muhtaj – soccer player
- Ariel Nasr – documentary filmmaker
- Salar Pashtoonyar - filmmaker
- Nelofer Pazira – filmmaker and author
- Parween Pazhwak – Persian artist and poet
- Patmeena Sabit – writer
- Humira Saqib – Journalist
- Massih Wassey – soccer player
- Hamid Zaher – writer and gay rights activist

== See also ==
- Afghan diaspora
- West Asian Canadians
- Pashtun diaspora
- Hazara diaspora
- List of Afghans
- Killing of Nooran Rezayi
