= Death of Abisay Cruz =

2025 death in Montreal, Canada

Abisay Cruz
- Born: March 1996
- Died: 30 March 2025 (aged 29); Saint-Michel, Montreal, Quebec, Canada

Abisay Cruz (March 1996 – 30 March 2025) was a Canadian citizen who died after being arrested and restrained by officers of the Montreal Police Service.

Police were called to the apartment where Cruz was living in response to reports of an individual "in crisis." Videos taken during the arrest show officers kneeling on Cruz's back while he stated he was "going to die." Cruz then lost consciousness, but paramedics were denied access until officers removed him from the building. He was transported by ambulance to hospital where he was pronounced dead.

Cruz's family members present during the incident allege police used excessive force and that racism may have influenced his treatment. The case was referred to Quebec's Bureau des enquêtes indépendantes (BEI), which investigates police misconduct. The BEI made a confidential report to the Quebec public prosecutor on 15 August 2025. As of late September 2025, the prosecutor had made no statement on the contents of the report.

== Background ==
Cruz lived in Montreal's Saint-Michel district, a low-income neighborhood with significant immigrant populations from Latin America, Haiti, and North Africa. He was the son of Marcelina Isidro, a member of the city's Spanish-speaking community, and brother to Josue Cruz and other siblings. He was survived by a 9-year-old son.

The Journal de Montréal reported Cruz had prior convictions for drug trafficking and assault.

== Death ==
On 30 March 2025, police responded to the apartment where Cruz was living after family reported he was experiencing a mental health crisis. The family then describe the officers becoming violent with Cruz, as they restrained him by the neck and knelt on his back. Witnesses reported officers kicked Cruz in the stomach during the arrest, and he sustained a chin injury from broken glass on the floor.

Video evidence shows handcuffed Cruz being repeatedly forced to the ground with an officer kneeling on his back. In one recording, Cruz is heard saying "Je vais mourir" ("I'm going to die"). Isidro reported her son became unresponsive but conscious before losing consciousness completely.

According to family members, paramedics were barred from entering the apartment building while officers dragged the unconscious Cruz downstairs. Video shows paramedics performing CPR outside before transporting Cruz to hospital, where he was declared dead. Videos circulating on social media, showing the CPR, suggest Cruz may have died outside the apartment building.

The Bureau des enquêtes indépendantes (BEI), the body responsible for investigating possible police misconduct in Quebec, launched an investigation on the day of Cruz's death. The BEI report, which was not released to the public, was passed to the Directeur des poursuites criminelles et pénales (DPCP) on the 15th of August. The DCPC will decide on whether any charges will be made against the police officers involved in Cruz's death. As of late September 2025, the DPCP had made no charges or statements on the report's contents.

== Public response ==
=== Demonstrations ===
A vigil was held near Cruz's apartment on 1 April 2025, with attendees demanding "justice for Abisay" and criticizing police actions. On 6 April, approximately 200 protesters marched through Saint-Michel, passing a local police station. The demonstration turned confrontational when fireworks were launched near Boulevard Pie-IX, resulting in six arrests.

Following the protests, Montreal police urged calm while Cruz's family requested support for their call for a public coroner's inquiry rather than further demonstrations.

=== Allegations of misconduct ===
From the initial accounts of the family and the circulation of videos of the event, widespread criticism of the actions of the attending officers has occurred. Cruz's mother and brother have frequently questioned the level of violence employed by the police and the refusal to allow medical staff access to Cruz within the apartment, stating that he was treated "like an animal". The family also sustain racism was a factor in his treatment.

Fo Niemi of the Center for Research-Action on Race Relations criticized what he saw as a failure to follow police de-escalation protocols. Niemi also complained that no autopsy report had been given to the family, and that they had not received notification of the cause of death. The family called for a public coroner's enquiry to resolve these questions. Family lawyer René Saint-Léger noted officers violated training by maintaining pressure on Cruz's back rather than rolling him sideways.

Concordia University professor Ted Rutland questioned the necessity of handcuffs and multiple officers restraining someone posing no threat. In a The Rover op-ed, Rutland and Svens Telemacque argued the incident justified community distrust of police.

Former police inspector Roger Ferland urged the public to avoid calling the behaviour of the police officers into question and to await the BEI investigation's conclusion, commenting that in general police followed protocol in these situations although that could sometimes be difficult.

In September 2025, a month after the BEI's report was passed to the DPCP, an article by Aurélie Lanctôt in Le Devoir questioned when the public would be made aware of the contents of the report. In the article, she called into question the transparency, independence and neutrality of the BEI in its response to police violence and argued that, instead of offering justice to those who have had a loved one taken from them by the actions of the police, the BEI existed as a mechanism for the legitimation of force and the covering up of any fault.

== See also ==
- Death of Adama Traoré
- Killing of Anthony Griffin
