= Robert Ménard (policeman) =

Canadian policeman (1934–2016)

Robert Ménard (10 June 1934 – 16 August 2016), better known as "Shotgun Bob", was a Canadian policeman. In 2016, the journalist Tu Thanh Ha described Ménard as a "legendary" policeman in Montreal famed for his intelligence and toughness.

== From delinquent to policeman ==
Ménard was born in Sherbrooke, Quebec into a working class French-Canadian family, the son of Hector Ménard and Cécile Robidas, and grew up in Cookshire. As a youth, he was frequently in trouble with the law owing to his petty crimes. Ménard's father served in the Royal Canadian Navy during the Second World War and was killed in the line of duty. His widowed mother worked in a variety of jobs in Montreal to support her children. At the age of 12, Ménard planned to rob a bank, which led him to be placed "in care" at a Catholic reform school. Ménard recalled that the beatings and whippings he endured from the Catholic priests led to a change in attitude as he stated: "You had the choice of either remaining a little punk or shaping up. I chose to shape up." Ménard afterwards served in the Canadian Army and then worked for the Canadian National railroad.

In 1958, he applied for the Service de police de la Ville de Montréal and was refused under the grounds of his criminal record. Ménard then asked for the help of his Catholic priest teachers, a Brother Julien, who was able to persuade the police to accept Ménard. In the spring of 1959, Ménard joined the Montreal police as a constable. He was assigned to station 14 in the Notre-Dame-de-Grâce neighborhood. On his first shift, he arrested two automobile thieves after a chase down the streets.

In 1960, he was assigned to the intelligence section of the police and used for undercover work. Ménard's first undercover mission was to infiltrate an illegal gambling house. Menard was assigned to infiltrate a Front de libération du Québec (FLQ) cell in the 1960s, and found himself being subjected to numerous political Marxist discussion meetings alongside readings of the poems by Charles Baudelaire, whose poetry the FLQ adored, but which Menard hated. Ménard said of Baudelaire's poetry: "I fucking hate that stuff." The working class Ménard described the FLQ members he knew as a group of intellectuals-turned-terrorists whose fondness for poems by Baudalaire and Marxist tracts he found difficult to endure. Ménard's alias of a hippie poet led to the arrest of the FLQ cell, who were planning several bombings. During Expo 67, Ménard adopted the guise of a cab driver to foil a FLQ bombing plot. Over the course of his police career, Ménard adopted 17 different identities. In a 2006 speech, Ménard stated about undercover work: "You have to be a good actor to do this job. You have to have the instinct of the hunter and control your fear". Ménard married Carolyn Galloway, by whom he had two children, Joelle and Marc. His marriage ended in divorce.

== The Violi assignment ==
In December 1970, Ménard was assigned to infiltrate the Cotroni family by renting an apartment just above the Reggio Bar owned and managed by Paolo Violi, the underboss of the Cotroni family. Ménard brought along an attractive blond buxom woman who played the role of his "wife" who was actually the girlfriend of a policeman. Ménard's "wife" served to distract the lecherous Violi who kept staring at her breasts. After starting suspiciously at Ménard, Violi agreed to rent the apartment to him largely because he liked his "wife". Ménard who used the alias Robert Wilson was supposed to go undercover for three months, but instead served undercover for about five years and paid $125 per month for a small apartment just above the Reggio Bar. Ménard recalled about the bugs he installed all over the Reggio Bar: "Violi couldn't go anywhere in the building without us hearing what he said." The wiretapes planted by Ménard showed that Violi viewed him as a "big, dumb mook". The police gave "Robert Wilson" a false criminal record with convictions for numerous petty crimes to avoid attracting the suspicion of Violi. Ménard described himself in a 2012 interview as playing a "slightly silly" electrician, which served to disarm any suspicions that Violi might hold against him.

Ménard under his Wilson identity hardly spoke at all to Violi during his first two years as his tenant and was most surprised when Violi wanted to speak over a meal of pizza and wine in 1972. Peter Edwards, the crime correspondent of The Toronto Star newspaper wrote: "Imagine Gene Hackman with twelve cups of coffee in his system and you have a pretty good picture of Bob Ménard. You would never catch Ménard saying he liked Paolo Violi, although it is clear he had a certain respect for him." Ménard described Violi and his fellow Mafiosi as a better class of criminals than the French-Canadian bank robbers who shot off most of his leg during a failed robbery attempt in 1985. Menard stated that Violi's eyes had "intelligence, but ruthlessness. Total ruthlessness. Paolo would kill, but he'd do it in a much more intelligent way....You want to know the difference? They [French-Canadian bank robbers] will kill you indiscriminately, for no reason, while Paolo would kill you if he had to for power and for position and for advantage. That's the difference...They'll [French-Canadian bank robbers] kill because they don't like you having a toothpick in your mouth. That's the difference here. Goddamn animals. Nothing else...Paolo would use killing as a means to an end, a method. If you kill someone that you're trying to gather money from-unless you want to use him as an example-what the hell's the use use of killing a source of revenue?...That's not businesslike. Real smart guys don't kill until it absolutely has to be done."

Ménard usually talked with Violi every Saturday mornings over numerous cups of coffee. Menard learned that Violi was a staunch federalist who detested Quebec separatism. Riots had erupted in September 1969 when the St. Leonard school board changed the language of instruction for Italian-Canadian children from English to French. Several Italian-Canadian school teachers who continued to teach in English received death threats, and Violi told Menard that he provided bodyguards to the teachers. Ménard recalled: "God, he hated the PQ party! I think he hated them more than the cops. He just hated them! He thought they were destroying Canada... He was very nationalistic. He spoke English a lot." Menard reported that Violi was an ill-tempered egoistical braggart, but that his company (along with his coffee) was far preferable to discussing turgid Marxist tracts and Baudelaire poems, which had been the case with the FLQ. In a 2012 interview, Ménard stated: "My goal was not to join the gang. It was to record the conversations and to develop good relations with Violi so that he did not suspect anything. We had cappuccinos together. We were talking about football because he was sponsoring a team. He hated the PQ, and so did I. We were talking about all that, but we weren't talking about crime. He liked me because I didn't stick my nose in his business".

Ménard recalled that Violi was the neighborhood leader in St. Leonard as he recalled: "There was some fear. He was like the don. He was like the godfather. I can remember some old people going over and kissing his hand...I guess it was a mark of respect. He was always bowed to. I'm not saying it was grandiose. It was little things." Violi received a steady steam of visitors at the Reggio Bar, mostly from New York and Hamilton. Ménard stated: "There would always be some big cars from the States and there would always be somebody there. All the time. It was like a parade. It was like a doctor's office with patients. You know, he'd be receiving in the afternoons. A car from New York. A car from New Jersey. A car from Ontario. God, all kinds of big, huge cars. They'd be parked. The guys would come in. Sometimes he'd greet them at the door. And they'd be on their way after a bit." Ménard made a point of writing down the license plate numbers of all of Violi's visitors. The recordings made by Ménard revealed much about the operations of the Mafia in not only Canada, but also the United States and Italy as well as Violi spoke very frankly about his criminal activities with his guests.

In 1971, long-standing tensions between the Sicilian faction of the Cotroni family led by Nicolo Rizzuto vs. the dominant Calabrian faction led by Vic Cotroni and Violi started to emerge. On 15 September 1972, one of Ménard's bugs recorded Vic Cotroni, the boss of the Cotroni family, tell Violi that he was considering expelling Rizzuto as he declared: "Me, I'm capo decina [the captain of the Montreal branch of the Bonanno family]. I got the right to expel". To resolve the dispute, two Mafiosi from the New York, Nicky Alfano and Nicola Buttofuoco, were sent to Montreal to mediate. Another of Ménard's bugs recorded Violi saying to Alfano and Buttofuoco: "I told him [Rizzuto] he goes from one thing to the other, here and there and says nothing to nobody. He does things and nobody knows nothing".

Ménard's bugs recorded Cotroni and Violi discussing "getting rid of" Rizzuto and make him "disappear" from Montreal forever. To prevent the Cotroni family from breaking apart, another Mafiosi, Giuseppe Settecase, was sent from New York to Montreal to mediate the dispute. At one point, Settecase and another New York Mafiosi were recorded by one of Ménard's bugs in the Reggio Bar engaged in a long nostalgic discussion about their past crimes in New York. Mario Latraverse, the chief of the Montreal police anti-gang unit, stated in 1990: "They came out with all the latest murders that occurred in New York City. They explained everything, everything. 'What happened to such and such?' 'Well, he died because of..'. And they painted the whole picture of organized crime in New York. Well, we called the New York authorities and they were flabbergasted...But they were here to mediate the request of Violi to kill Rizzuto. In that conversation,, there was proof that the Montreal family was a subfamily of the Bonanno family...And it was said then that money on a weekly basis was leaving Montreal...every Monday to go to New York". The request to kill Rizzuto was refused by "the Commission" (the governing board of the American Mafia), but Rizzuto in 1974 left Montreal to avoid testifying at the Commission d'enquête sur le crime organisé hearings for Venezuela, which had no extradition treaty with Canada.

Violi played the role of a community leader within the Italian-Canadian community in Montreal, serving as a banker, judge and community mediator. He was known for providing free ice cream to children at the Reggio Bar, and he would never permit anyone to swear in front of children. However, his apparent generosity was self-interested as any favor he provided such as a loan or resolving a business dispute came with the understanding that he was entitled to favors in return. Ménard discovered much to his shock after the owner of a pizzeria saw him talking with Violi in the street that he refused to charge him for the pizza he just purchased, saying that any friend of Violi's was entitled to permanent free pizza from his pizzeria.

Ménard's undercover assignment was a difficult one as he saw his wife and his newly born son only occasionally on weekends. When Menard returned from his weekend visits, he had to come early in the morning to avoid Violi's guards who were always on the look-out for anything suspicious. In the wintertime, Menard would place snow on the hood and roof of his car when he returned to make it appear that his car had never left as he noted that Violi's guards would always check in the morning if the snow was atop of the tenants' automobiles and would want to know where the tenant was that night if there was no snow atop of the car. A woman volunteered to play the wife of "Robert Wilson", but she found the work too stressful and left the project to return to her boyfriend. Ménard made a great show of telling Violi that he was very upset that his wife had left him for another man, and received much sympathy. Edwards wrote: "Later, other women were brought in for short sojourns, so Violi would think that the depression hadn't rendered his upstairs tenant non-functional."

Ménard felt intense psychological stress by pretending to be someone he was not for years while always being afraid of making any mistake that give away his real identity. Violi once inspected Menard's car for the police identification numbers that all cars belonging to the Service de police de la Ville de Montréal are required to have, but in this case, the number had been filed away. As part of the Wilson identity, Ménard was billed as an electrician, which led Violi to ask him to fix a broken lightbulb. Menard attempted to fix the lightbulb by inspecting the wiring and the connections, and found there was nothing wrong. Finally, Menard noticed that the lightbulb was just burned out and needed to be replaced. Ménard noticed that Violi seemed to think he was an idiot for not checking if the lightbulb was burned out first, but he not suspect that he was a policeman.

A wire-recording made by Menard on 5 December 1973 showed that Violi was supremely confident that his office was not bugged and he mocked the Commission d'enquête sur le crime organisé (CECO) inquiry, saying in a contemptuous tone: "They're running around, butting in, and their balls are in an uproar because they don't know anything." On 30 April 1974, one of Ménard's bugs recorded the meeting between Johnny Papalia of Hamilton with Cotroni and Violi at the Reggio Bar. Cotroni and Violi first spoke in Calabrese (the Calabrian dialect of Italian) and then spoke in English when Papalia arrived at the Reggio Bar. Cotroni and Violi confronted Papalia with the evidence that he extorted $300, 000 dollars from a Toronto stockbroker, Stanley Bader, in 1973 by using the name of the Cotroni family without giving them any of the profits. The wire recorded Papalia as saying: "He [Bader] can say he gave it [the money] to Jesus Christ! I don't care what he says. He didn't give it to me, Vic!" The wire then recorded Cotroni as quite casually saying: "Let's hope so because, eh, we'll kill you". Papalia responded with visible fear in his voice: "I know you'll kill me, Vic. I believe you'll kill me". On the basis of the wiretapped evidence collected by Ménard, Cotroni, Violi and Papalia were convicted of extortion with all three being sentenced to six years in prison, though Cotroni and Violi were able to overturn their convictions on an appeal after serving only six months in prison. Papalia was so angry over Ménard's wiretaps that he challenged Latraverse to a fight in the men's washroom of the courthouse when Latraverse arrived to testify against him, but backed down when Latraverse proved all willing to take up on his challenge.

In September 1974, Vic Cotroni was subpoenaed to testify at the CECO hearings and was imprisoned for contempt for a year after the commissioners declared his testimony to be "voluntarily incomprehensible, disconnected, vague, hazy and equivalent to a refusal to testify". Following Cotroni's imprisonment, Violi took over control of the family as Philip Rastelli, the boss of the Bonnano family, appointed him acting boss. The value of the information collected by Ménard accordingly increased with Violi as the acting boss of the Cotroni family.

Ménard's assignment ended in November 1975 when Violi was ordered to testify at the CECO hearings. The recordings made by Ménard were played at the hearings and greatly damaged Violi's reputation as he came across as egoistical, greedy, arrogant, and abrasive. When "Robert Wilson" was revealed to be the undercover policeman Robert Menard, Violi expressed his respect for his skill as a policeman, telling his crew: "He's a stand-up guy. He's a better fucking soldier than the rest of you." The damage done to Violi's reputation led directly to his murder on 22 January 1978. Violi's superiors in the Bonnano family in New York would not forgive him for allowing an undercover policeman to bug the Reggio Bar as the journalist Jerry Langton wrote that Violi's underworld reputation was "in tatters" after the CECO hearings. In the aftermath of the CECO hearings, the Bonnano family shifted its support decisively to Rizzuto against Violi as the latter was considered to be incompetent. Vito Rizzuto, the son of Nicolo, went to New York to argue to "the Commission" that Violi was too incompetent to be the future boss of the Cotroni family as proved by the fact that he allowed Ménard to bug his office for five years, saying that a Mafiosi that "stupid" deserved to die for his incompetence. The journalists André Cedilot and André Noel wrote: "The Mafia would never forgive him [Violi] for being so stupidly careless as to let a cop bug his place of business." In the aftermath of Violi's murder, the Sicilian faction of the Cotroni family led by Rizzuto broke away to form the new Rizzuto family.

Pierre de Champlain of the Royal Canadian Mounted Police stated in 2016: "His [Ménard's] greatest achievement is to have managed to gain the confidence of the most powerful Mafioso of the time, Paolo Violi. Ménard knew that he could be discovered at any time and that no one would have hesitated for a second to kill him. He was an extraordinary policeman who was fearless."

== The Night Squad ==
After the Violi assignment was completed, Ménard was assigned to the Night Squad. During his time with the night squad, Ménard was involved in a brawl with Normand Dubois, one of the 9 Dubois brothers at 4: 30 am in a back ally. The journalist Tu Thanh Ha wrote: "... the police had no qualms about meting out violence when dealing with career criminals. He [Ménard] recalled clearing outlaw bikers from a bar by approaching the leader and smashing his flashlight on the man's face." As a member of the Night Squad, Ménard played a key role in bringing down the Dubois brothers, though as Langton noted that methods used by the "notorious Night Squad" were quite ruthless and "... would not necessarily be approved of by outsider observers." Ménard's partner André Kourie stated: "When there were night club raids, Bob would come up on stage with his .12 [shotgun] and yell, 'Nobody move, your hands on the table!' It did not persist!" The fact that Ménard always had a shotgun with him during his Night Squad work led to him having the nickname "Shotgun Bob".

== The Homicide and Robbery Squad ==
Ménard was then assigned to the homicide and robbery squad in 1980. During one robbery which he was only supposed to observe, Ménard chased, took down and arrested the thieves as they fled. Kourie recalled: "He couldn't help himself. Each time he saw a bad guy he had to run after him. It was tiring for us." In September 1984, Ménard used his shotgun to wound a bank robber during a shoot-out. On 31 January 1985, Rock Blais, a thief who had robbed a Steinberg's grocery store, pointed his rifle at Ménard, who used his shotgun to kill Blais. A judicial review ruled that Ménard was justified in killing Blais, a violent career criminal, who had pointed his gun at him.

On 28 March 1985, Ménard was involved in a shoot-out with two bank robbers in LaSalle. A bank had been robbed of $13, 232 at gunpoint by two thieves, Christian Bouchard and Marc Lorange. Ménard responded to the robbery call and a shoot-out ensured where some 143 bullets were fired. During the shoot-out, Ménard killed Lorange with his shotgun. In the course of the shoot-out, Ménard was shot in the chest and in both legs. He recalled: "It felt like I was hit by a baseball bat. I saw the blood come out like a fountain." Ménard said of the robbers who shot him: "Look in their eyes. What do you see? You see hatred. You see no fucking soul. You know what I see? I see an animal."

== Retirement ==
Ménard was forced into a desk position because of his wounds. At the same time, his son Marc died of brain cancer, which greatly saddened him. Marc Ménard had followed his father into police work and had just joined the Royal Canadian Mounted Police. In 1989, Ménard retired after 30 years on the police force. Ménard settled in the Pointe-Claire district. The information collected by Ménard between 1970 and 1975 in Montreal was so useful to the police that he was declared an honorary citizen of Agrigento to honor him for his anti-Mafia work. The information collected by Ménard led to several convictions of Mafiosi in Italy. In his acceptance speech given in Agrigento in Italian in 2005, Ménard stated that the honor was not due to him, but rather all his colleagues on the Montreal police force. In 2016, he was the subject of the documentary Shotgun Bob. Ménard died of a heart attack in 2016.

== Books ==
- Cedilot, Andre; Noel, Andre (2012). Mafia Inc. The Long, Bloody Reign of Canada's Sicilian Clan. Toronto: Random House of Canada. ISBN 9780307360410.
- Edwards, Peter (1990). Blood Brothers: How Canada's Most Powerful Mafia Family Runs Its Business. Toronto: Key Porter Books. ISBN 155013213X.
- Langton, Jerry (2015). Cold War How Organized Crime Works in Canada and Why It's About to Get More Violent. Toronto: HarperColllins. ISBN 978-1-4434-3255-9.
- Schneider, Stephen (2009). Iced: The Story of Organized Crime in Canada. Toronto: John Wiley & Sons. ISBN 978-0470835005..
