= Moses Judah Hays =

Canadian municipal leader (1799–1861)

Capt. Moses Judah Hays
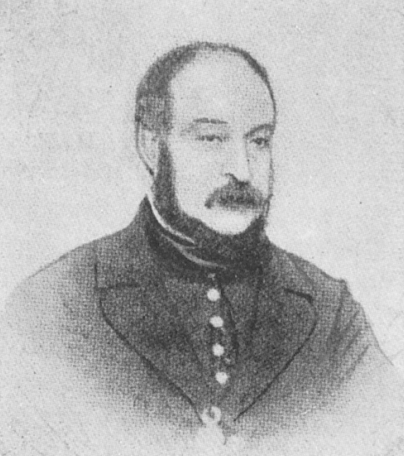

6th Chief of the Montreal Police Service
- In office 1845–1861

Personal details
- Born: 1799 Montreal, Lower Canada
- Died: 12 November 1861 (aged 61–62) Montreal, United Province of Canada

Moses Judah Hays (1799 (Note: 1789 according to some sources. His age, however, is given as 60 in the 1861 Canadian census.) – 12 November 1861) was a Canadian businessman and municipal leader. He established and managed the first water-works in Montreal, and served as the city's chief of police from 1845 until his death.

== Early life ==
Moses Judah Hays was born into a prominent Jewish family in Montreal. His mother, Brandele Abigail (née David; 1762–1840), was the sister of fur trader David David. His father, Andrew Hays (1742–1835), one of the founders of the Shearith Israel Synagogue, came from a well-established Sephardic family which emigrated from Holland to the United States in the first quarter of the eighteenth century. Among his relatives were lawyer Daniel P. Hays, ophthalmologist Isaac Hays, police officer Jacob Hays, and painter William J. Hays.

== Career ==
Hays began his career as a clerk in Montreal's Royal Engineers Department and continued to contribute to civic life for many years thereafter. He joined the Montreal Mechanics' Institution in 1829. When Montreal was incorporated as a city in 1832, Hays established its first municipal water system, which he operated until selling it to the city at a loss in 1845. He was also a director of Joseph Masson's gas company and of the Montreal Provident and Savings Bank, and between 1836 and 1840 served as a judge on the Court of Special Sessions, which administered the city. In 1837, he and Benjamin Hart were appointed magistrates, becoming the first Jews in Canada to be appointed to that office.

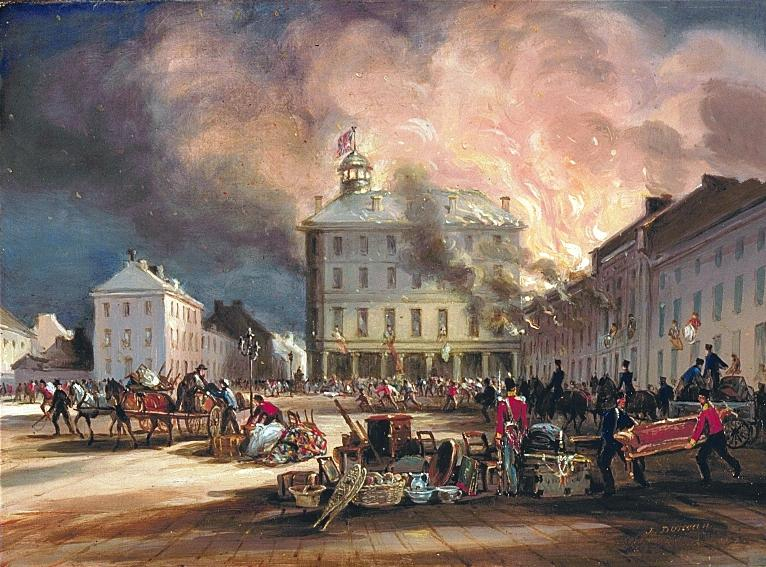
Hayes House burning on Dalhousie Square (1852)

He opened Hays House in Dalhousie Square in 1847. The four-storey block of buildings included a hotel, a shopping area, and a theatre, and featured a panoramic view extending over the entire city. It became a centre of activity for Montreal's nouveau riche. The theatre hosted concerts by Anna Bishop, Nicolas-Charles Bochsa, the Germania Musical Society, and others, as well as theatrical performances. After the burning of the Parliament Buildings in April 1849, Hays leased the building to Parliament to serve as its temporary seat. It was destroyed in the Great Fire of 1852.

Hays was active in the Montreal Jewish community, serving as gabbai and later president of the Shearith Israel Synagogue. He planned and superintended the construction of a new building for the Synagogue, which opened in 1838. In 1847, he and Rev. Abraham de Sola organized the Hebrew Philanthropic Society to assist poor Jewish immigrants.

Outside the Jewish community, Hays served as president of the Montreal Agricultural Society, secretary of the Montreal Mechanics' Institute, and a member of the Provincial Grand Lodge. In 1849, he was appointed to Montreal's Central Board of Health. In 1854, he was installed as Chief of Police. (Note: Some sources mistakenly give the year of his appointment as 1845. The correct date is confirmed by his obituary in the Montreal Herald.)

Hays died of a sudden heart attack on the morning of 12 November 1861.

== Notes ==
Preceded by Charles O. Ermatinger	6th Chief of the Montreal Police Service; 1854–1861	Succeeded by Guillaume Lamothe
