= Marc Parent (police) =

Chief of the Montreal Police Service
- In office September 13, 2010 – September 2015
- Preceded by: Yvan Delorme
- Succeeded by: Philippe Pichet

Personal details
- Education: Université du Québec à Montreal; École nationale d'administration publique FBI National Academy – University of Virginia.

Marc Parent
- Police career
- Service years: 1984-present

Marc Parent is the former Director of Police of the City of Montreal Police Service. He was appointed on September 13, 2010, as the 35th Director. Prior to becoming the Director of Police, he was Assistant Director of Police. He left office in 2015 and was succeeded by Philippe Pichet.

Parent earned a BA in business administration from Université du Québec à Montreal and an MA in Public Administration from École nationale d'administration publique. Parent also has a degree from the FBI National Academy – University of Virginia.

Parent succeeded Yvan Delorme.
