= Caporegime =

Rank in the Sicilian Mafia and Italian-American Mafia

Structure of a Mafia crime family

A caporegime or capodecina, usually shortened to capo or informally referred to as "captain", "skipper" or "lieutenant", is a leadership position in the Mafia (both the Sicilian Mafia and Italian-American Mafia). A capo is a "made member" of an Italian crime family who heads a regime or "crew" of soldiers and has major status and influence in the organization. Caporegime is an Italian word, used to signify the head of a faction/crew within a family in Sicily. In general, the term indicates the head of a branch of an organized crime syndicate who commands a crew of soldiers and reports directly to the don (boss) or an underboss or street boss. The shortened version "capo" has also been used to refer to certain high-ranking members of Latin American drug cartels.

== See also ==
- Capodecina

== Sources ==
- Capeci, Jerry. The Complete Idiot's Guide to the Mafia. Indianapolis: Alpha Books, 2002. ISBN 0-02-864225-2.
- Pistone, Joseph D. Donnie Brasco: My Undercover Life in the Mafia. Pan Books, 1989. ISBN 9780330305747.
- Pileggi, Nicholas. Wiseguy: Life in a Mafia Family. Simon & Schuster, 1985. ISBN 9780671447342.
