= Longueuil Agglomeration Police Service =

Police force of Longueuil, Quebec

Service de police de Longueuil Urban agglomeration of Longueuil Police Service
- Motto: Latin: Nihil Aliud Quam Optimum; English: Nothing but the best

Agency overview
- Formed: 2002

Operational structure
- Headquarters: Longueuil, Quebec
- Sworn members: 660 < https://cdn-contenu.quebec.ca/cdn-contenu/adm/min/securite-publique/publications-adm/publications-secteurs/police/realite-policiere/2411_Longueuil_2.pdf>
- Unsworn members: 307
- Elected officer responsible: François Bonnardel, Ministre de la Sécurité publique
- Agency executive: , Patrick Bélanger Chief of Police

Facilities
- 699 Boulevard Curé-Poirier O.s: 2

Website
- longueuil.quebec/police

The Service de police de l'agglomération de Longueuil (French pronunciation: [sɛʁvis də pɔlis də laɡlɔmeʁasjɔ̃ də lɔ̃ɡœj]) or SPAL (English: Urban agglomeration of Longueuil Police Service) is the police force for the urban agglomeration of Longueuil, Quebec. The Headquarter of this Police department is 699 Curé-Poirier O. In Longueuil.

== Vehicles ==
- Ford Taurus Police Interceptor
- Ford Crown Victoria (Phased Out)
- Ford Explorer Police Interceptor
- Dodge Charger
- Dodge Durango
- Ford F-150

== Sidearm ==
Officers are issued the Heckler & Koch HK P2000 Compact 9 mm which replaced the Heckler & Koch USP as their standard issue sidearm. The holster of choice is a Safariland holster.

== North division ==
The north division encompasses the cities/boroughs of:

- Boucherville
- Saint-Lambert
- Longueuil
  - Borough of Vieux-Longueuil

== South division ==
The south division includes the cities/boroughs of :

- Brossard
- Saint-Bruno-de-Montarville
- Longueuil
  - Borough of Greenfield Park
  - Borough of Saint-Hubert

== See also ==
- Service de police de la Ville de Montréal
