= Great Fire of 1852 =

Conflagration in Montreal, Canada

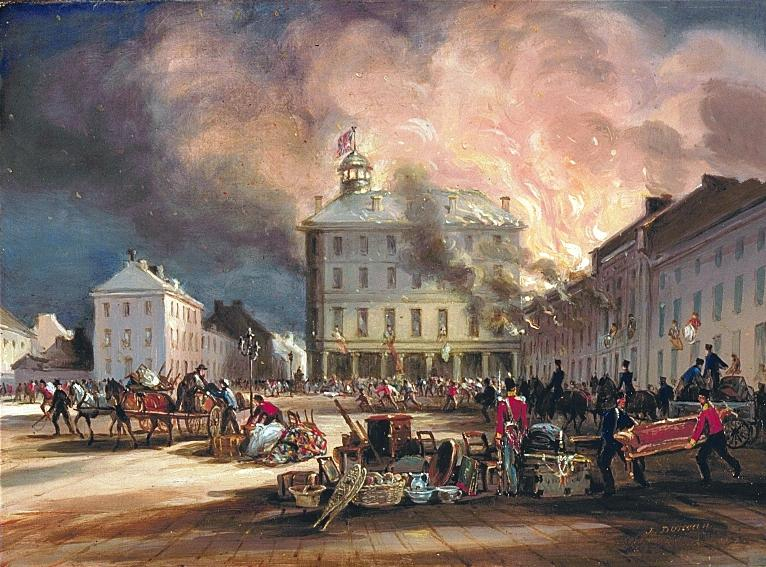
Destruction of the Hays House in Dalhousie Square, 1852.

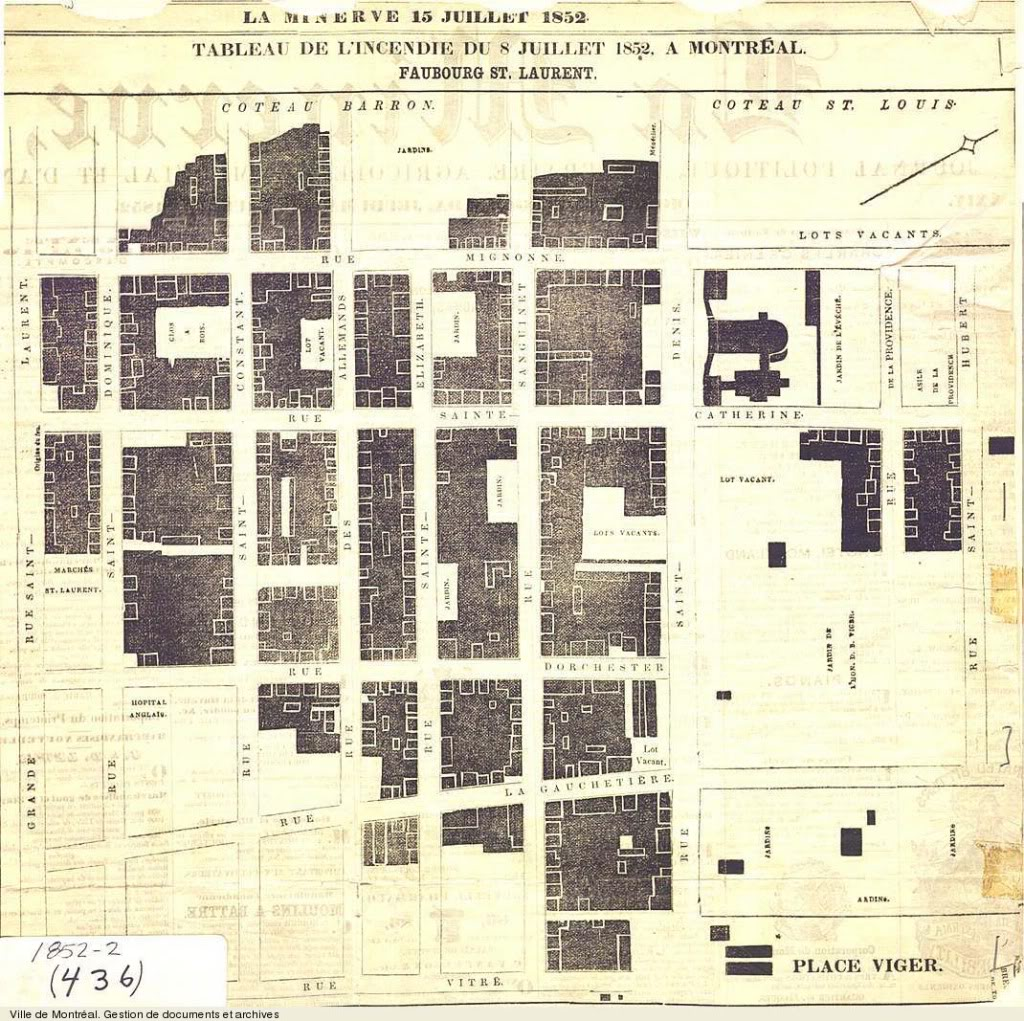
Map of buildings destroyed by fire, published in La Minerve, July 15, 1852.

The Great Fire of 1852 was a fire in Montreal that began on July 8, 1852, and left as many as 10,000 people homeless (at a time when the city's population was only 57,000) and destroyed almost half of the city's housing. The fire occurred at a time when the city's recently constructed reservoir, located at the site of today's Saint-Louis Square, was drained and closed for repairs. The first fire broke out at a tavern on St. Lawrence Boulevard and spread quickly, fanned by strong winds and hot, dry summer weather.

The fire that started on St. Lawrence originated from a wooden house, as was typical at the time. It spread from there to the blocks eastward to Saint Denis Street and southward to Craig Street (now Saint Antoine Street). The flames engulfed the Saint-Jacques Cathedral, the hospital on Dorchester Street and the Theatre Royal. Within hours, one quarter of Montreal was destroyed.

== Before the Great Fire of 1852 ==
Montreal was founded in 1642. Wealthy French-Canadians moved to the area in search of a new place to settle. The new colony formed a government and educational system, which grew as the years went on. Later on in Montreal's history, the diversity of citizens increased as work became more available. This meant mostly Irish and Chinese, who came to North America in search of work but ironically were the ones who were most affected by the fire. Prior to Great Fire of 1852, there were several other fires and problems that occurred. The most notable was when the Parliament building was set ablaze in 1849. The city was in economic turmoil and this left houses and stores without any business or tenants. Following the parliament building blaze, there were four more major blazes in the early 1850s that consumed many of Montreal's housing districts. These fires destroyed over 350 different buildings in the span of two years. This, however, was nowhere near the number of homes engulfed by the Great Fire of July 8 and 9 of 1852.

== Montreal Fire Department ==
The Montreal Fire Brigade originated as a volunteer service which was not particularly effective in combating fires. Early on, the only way to obtain water was by going to public water pumps, private wells, or to a nearby river or lake. While combating fires, it would be incredibly difficult for volunteer firefighters to go from the burning houses, back to the water supply, and back again to the blaze. This would take too much time, allowing the fire to rage on. One way to solve this problem was to have carters going from the water supply to the homes in Montreal. These carters would carry buckets of water to the city and try to get there before any other carters could. This was due to the incentive of three dollars extra pay for getting there first. This of course would cause for the carters to rush, not fill the bucket all the way, or spill some of the water on their way over to the house. Spilling water would cause major problems while fighting fires because there would not be enough to put out a house fire and once they ran out of water, the fire would rage out of control.

The Montreal Fire Brigade at the time of the July 8–9, 1852 fire was a group of around 12 volunteer firefighters. The coordinator of this company of volunteers was a man named John Perrigo. Perrigo was not the best fire chief that had ever served the people of Montreal and his actions to combat the fire demonstrated this. His main plan was to destroy buildings that were on fire to cause a firebreak. The few volunteer firefighters were no match for the fire. They required help from soldiers to dismantle buildings in order to stop the destruction.

The professional era of the fire brigade came to be in the late nineteenth century. The city's government found it too expensive to hire the manpower to operate the equipment that had been used previously. The new steam fire engine allowed the city to hire the men who were trained in the use of the machinery and in the art of firefighting. This new technology and the need for professional firefighters changed the Montreal Fire Brigade forever.

== Aftermath ==
The disaster led to the construction of a newer and larger reservoir and to the dismissal of the city's chief engineer, who had coordinated Montreal's all-volunteer fire companies, for failing to respond quickly enough to stop the spread of the blaze.

== New architecture ==
After the fire, Montreal began to urbanize and industrialize. With the progressive movement, newer and safer houses needed to be built in order to provide shelter to the new inhabitants of the city. New fireproof technology was introduced to building architecture in order to prevent destructive fires. Much of the blame for the disaster was attributed to the wooden gutters (eavestroughs) that were used in Montreal at the time. When the gutters caught fire, they caused the rafters to be set ablaze as well, which caused the inside of the buildings be engulfed as well as the fire grew. A witness to the rebuilding stage stated that the new buildings were of greater quality and that the lots that were not being built on were some of the best areas in the city.

== See also ==
- List of fires in Canada
- List of disasters in Canada
