= Roseline Granet =

French artist

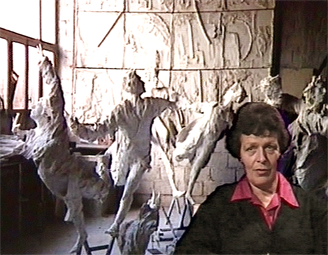
- Roseline Granet (1995)
- Born: 28 January 1936 (age 90); Paris
- Website: roselinegranet.fr

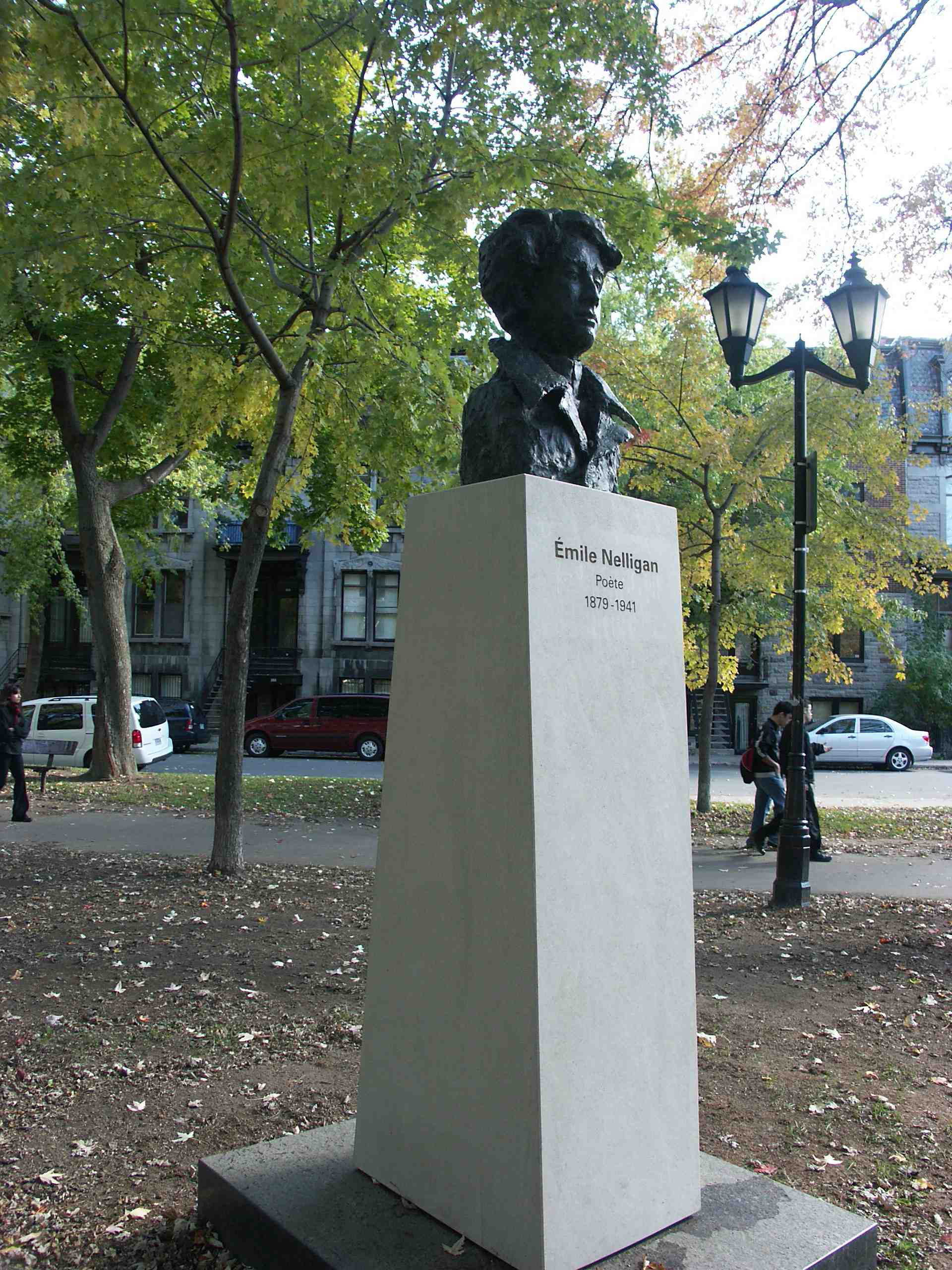
Émile Nelligan bust BY Roseline Granet, Saint-Louis Suare, Montréal

Roseline Granet (born 1936) is a French sculptor and painter.

Granet studied at the Art Students League of New York in 1954.

== Public art ==
In 1987 Granet was commissioned by the city of Paris to produce a statue of the French philosopher Jean Paul Sartre, which was placed permanently in the courtyard of the Bibliothèque nationale de France in Paris.

In 2005, she created a bust of the poet Émile Nelligan, now permanently installed in the Saint-Louis Square, Montréal. Her bronze sculpture of Quebec painter Jean Paul Riopelle, titled Le Grand Jean-Paul, is installed in Place Jean-Paul Riopelle in Montreal.

== Collections ==
Her work is included in the collection of the Musée national des beaux-arts du Québec, the City of Montreal public art collection and the Mauermuseum, Berlin.
