= Saint-Louis Square =

Public park in Montreal, Quebec, Canada

Saint Louis Square
- French: square Saint-Louis
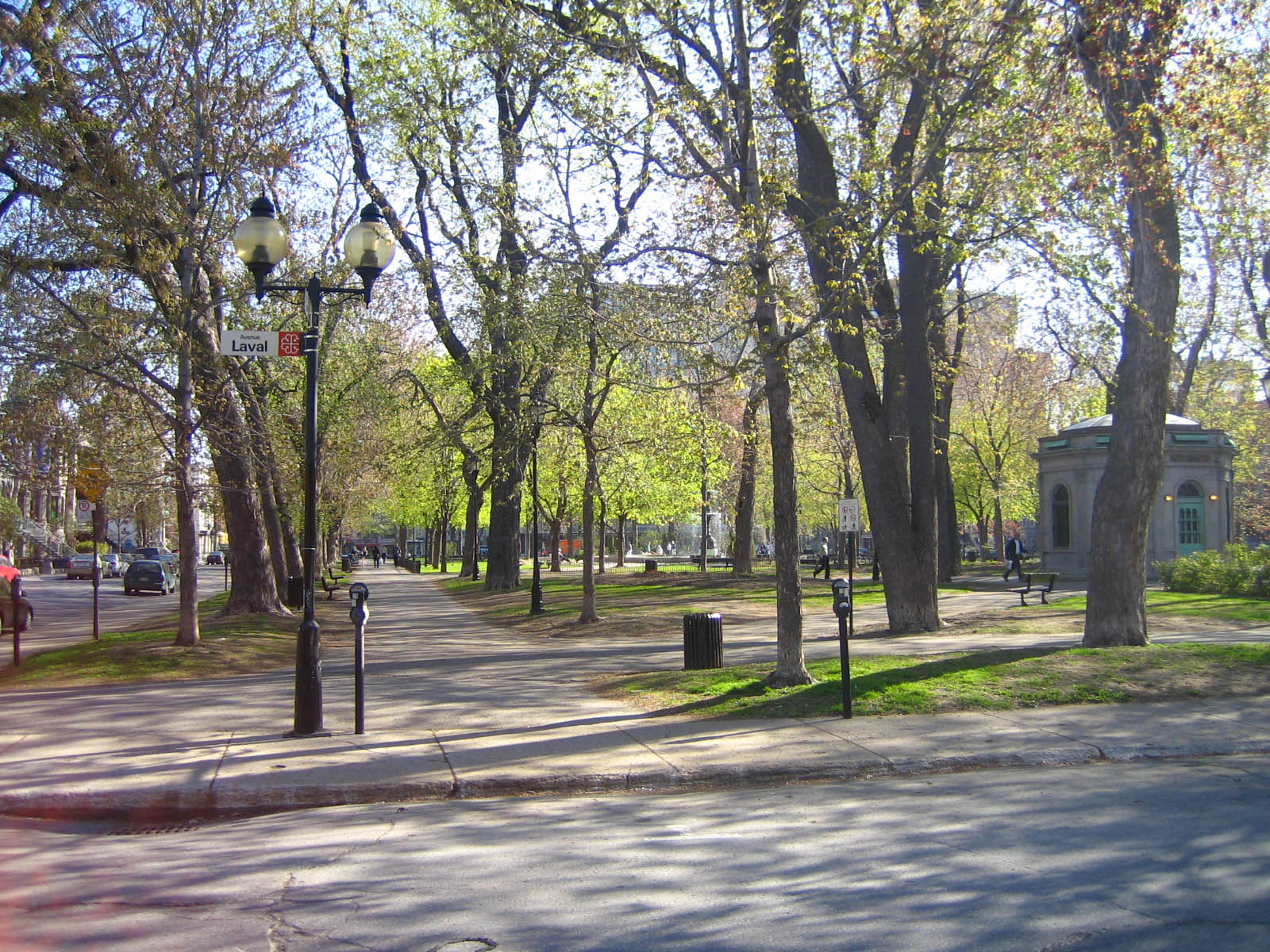
- Saint Louis Square, looking east from Laval Street, fountain in the distance, 2005.

- Location within Montreal
- Type: Town square
- Location: Le Plateau-Mont-Royal, Montreal, Quebec, Canada
- Coordinates: 45°31′01″N 73°34′12″W
- Created: 1876
- Operator: City of Montreal
- Public transit: at Sherbrooke station Terminus Sherbooke

Saint Louis Square (officially in French: square Saint-Louis) is an urban square in Montreal's Plateau Mont Royal. Its eastern edge fronts onto Saint Denis Street, a major north–south artery. Square Saint Louis Street runs along both the square's northern and southern sides, while Laval Avenue runs along its western side.

== Overview ==
The square is located on the site of the city's former reservoir, which was in use until 1852, after which it was replaced by the McTavish reservoir following the Great Fire of 1852. The square was created in 1876 and was named for two businessmen, brothers Emmanuel Saint-Louis and Jean-Baptiste Saint-Louis.

The Project for Public Spaces has called the square "the closest thing to a European neighbourhood square you'll find this side of the Atlantic."

== Art ==
=== Fontaine du Square Saint-Louis ===
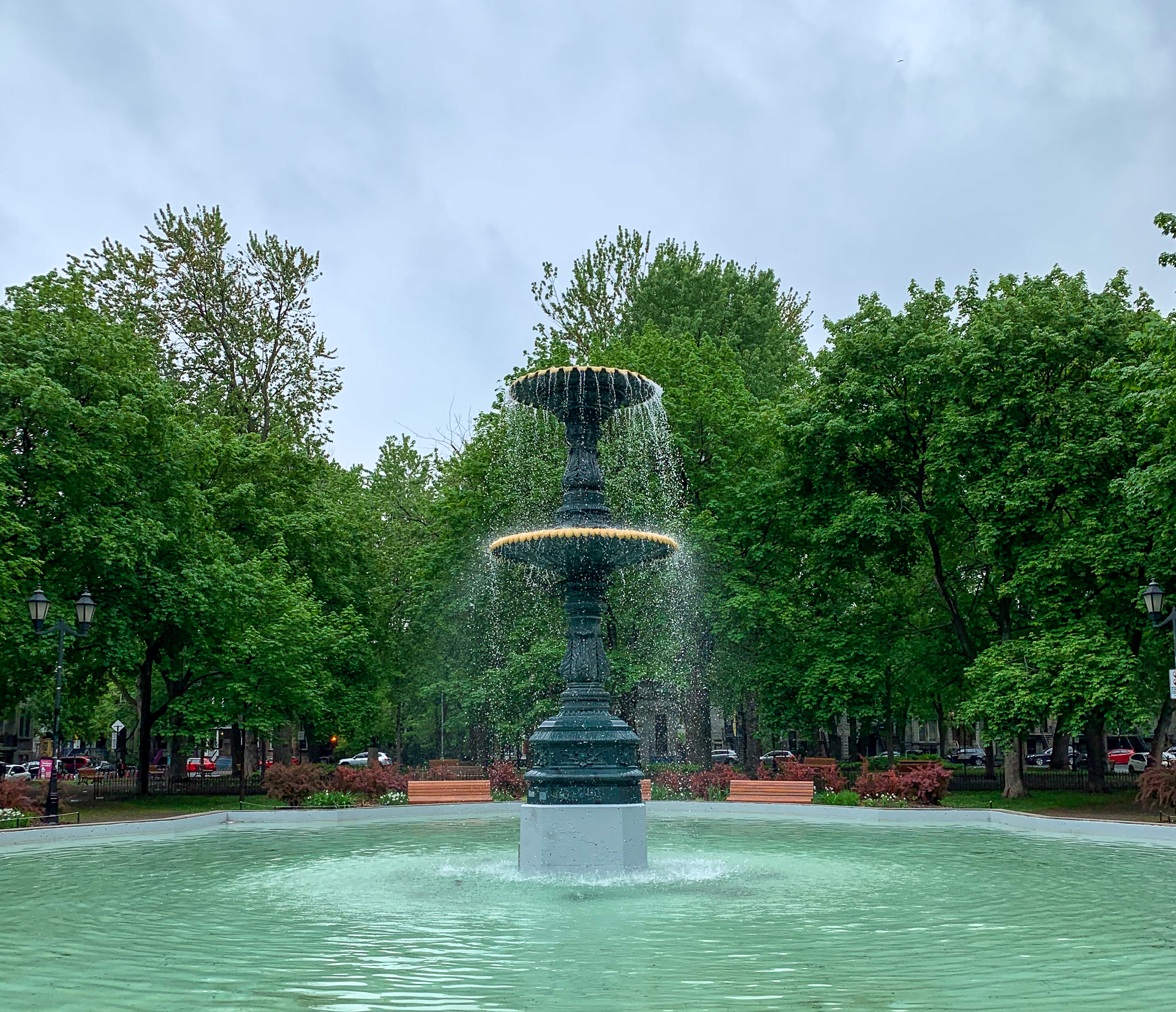
Fontaine du Square Saint-Louis

The square's centrepiece is a cast-iron fountain by Jordan L. Mott. It is one of the earliest public fountains in the city, composed of two basins, one above the other.

Pieces for this type of fountain would be ordered through the catalogue of J.L. Mott Iron Works, which then were assembled to create a customized composition.

=== Monument à Louis-Octave Cremazie ===
A bust of Octave Crémazie was unveiled on June 24, 1906, designed by Louis-Philippe Hébert, near the home of Émile Nelligan, which faces the square.

=== Monument à Émile Nelligan ===
Nelligan himself was honoured with a bust in the square 99 years later, on June 7, 2005, designed by Roseline Granet.

== Surrounding buildings ==
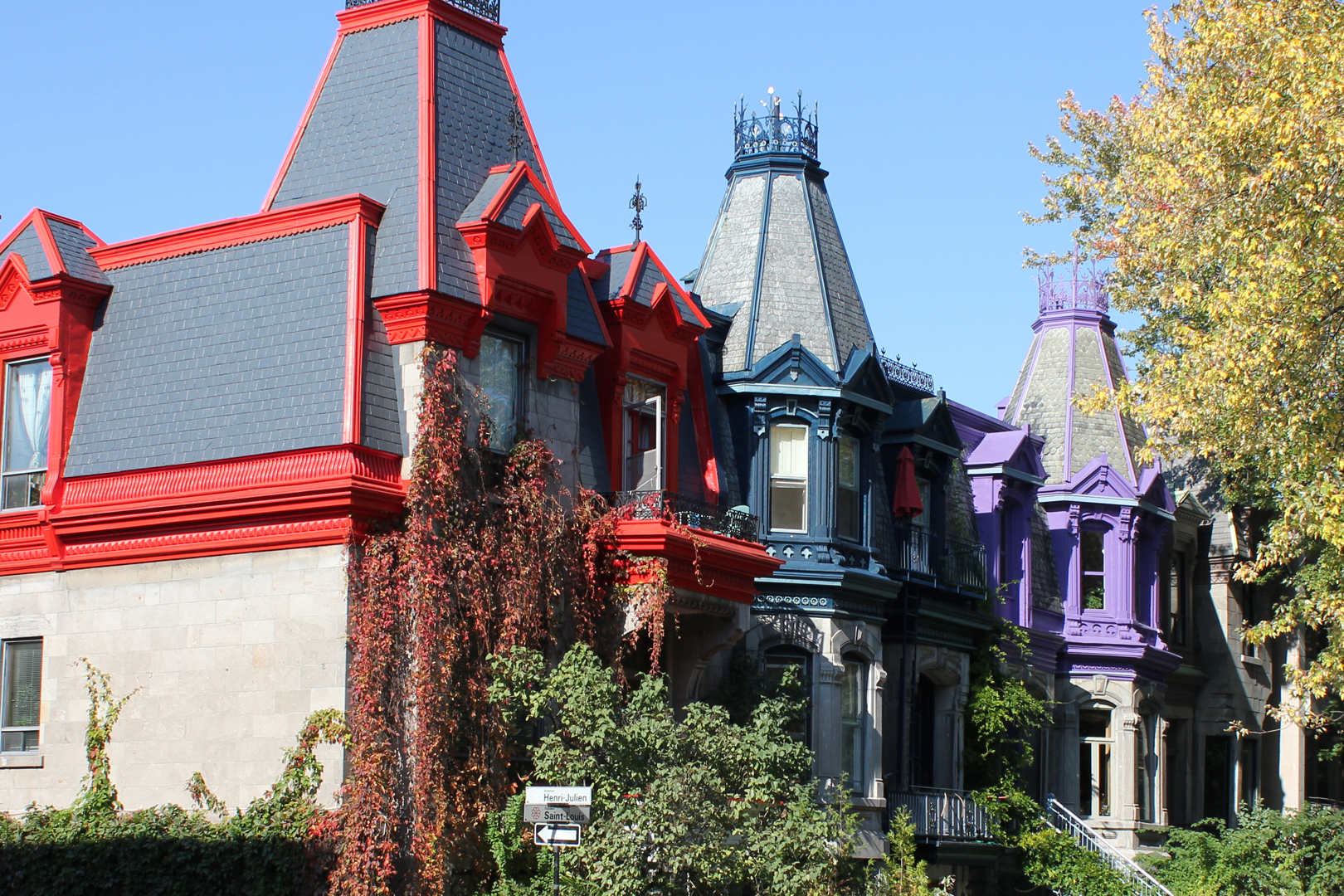
Detail of Victorian row houses facing the square, fall 2011.

The square is also notable for the Victorian-style residences that face the park. The Union des écrivaines et des écrivains québécois used to be headquartered at 3492 Laval Street, which had once been the residence of director Claude Jutra. The apartment at 3614 Laval Street was also used to film the opening scene of the 1967 thriller film Wait Until Dark, followed by an exterior scene showing the Saint-Louis Square. The character in the opening scene (played by Jean Del Val) is named "Louis" as a nod to the park across the street.
