= Paolo Violi =

Italian-Canadian mobster

- Born: 6 February 1931; Sinopoli, Calabria, Italy
- Died: 22 January 1978 (aged 46); Montreal, Quebec, Canada
- Cause of death: Gunshot
- Resting place: Notre Dame des Neiges Cemetery, Côte-des-Neiges–Notre-Dame-de-Grâce, Montreal
- Other name: Paul
- Citizenship: Italian; Canadian
- Occupation: Mobster
- Spouse: Grazia Luppino (m. 1965)
- Children: Domenico Violi; Giuseppe Violi
- Parent: Domenico Violi
- Relatives: Francesco Violi (brother); Rocco Violi (brother); Giacomo Luppino (father-in-law)
- Allegiance: Bonanno crime family Cotroni crime family
- Conviction: Extortion (1975)
- Penalty: Six years' imprisonment; served six months on appeal

Paolo Violi (Italian: [ˈpaːolo ˈvjɔːli; viˈɔːli]; 6 February 1931 – 22 January 1978) was an Italian-Canadian mobster and capodecina in the Cotroni crime family of Montreal.

Violi was born in Sinopoli, Calabria, Italy, in 1931; his father Domenico was the boss of the Violi clan in his hometown. Violi immigrated to Southern Ontario in 1951. He married Grazia Luppino, the daughter of the boss of the Luppino crime family in Hamilton. He later moved to Montreal where he became associated with the Calabrese Cotroni crime family, which controlled much of organized crime in Montreal. In the late 1970s, boss Vincenzo Cotroni transferred the family's day-to-day activities to Violi, and a mob war soon broke out between the Calabrians and the Sicilian faction led by Nicolò Rizzuto. The war resulted in the murder of Violi on 22 January 1978, as well as his brothers, as the Sicilian Rizzuto crime family emerged as the preeminent crime family in Montreal by the early 1980s. After Violi's death, his widow and two sons, Domenico and Giuseppe moved to Hamilton; the Violi brothers became affiliated with the Luppino crime family, later known as the Luppino-Violi crime family.

== Criminal career ==
=== Early career ===
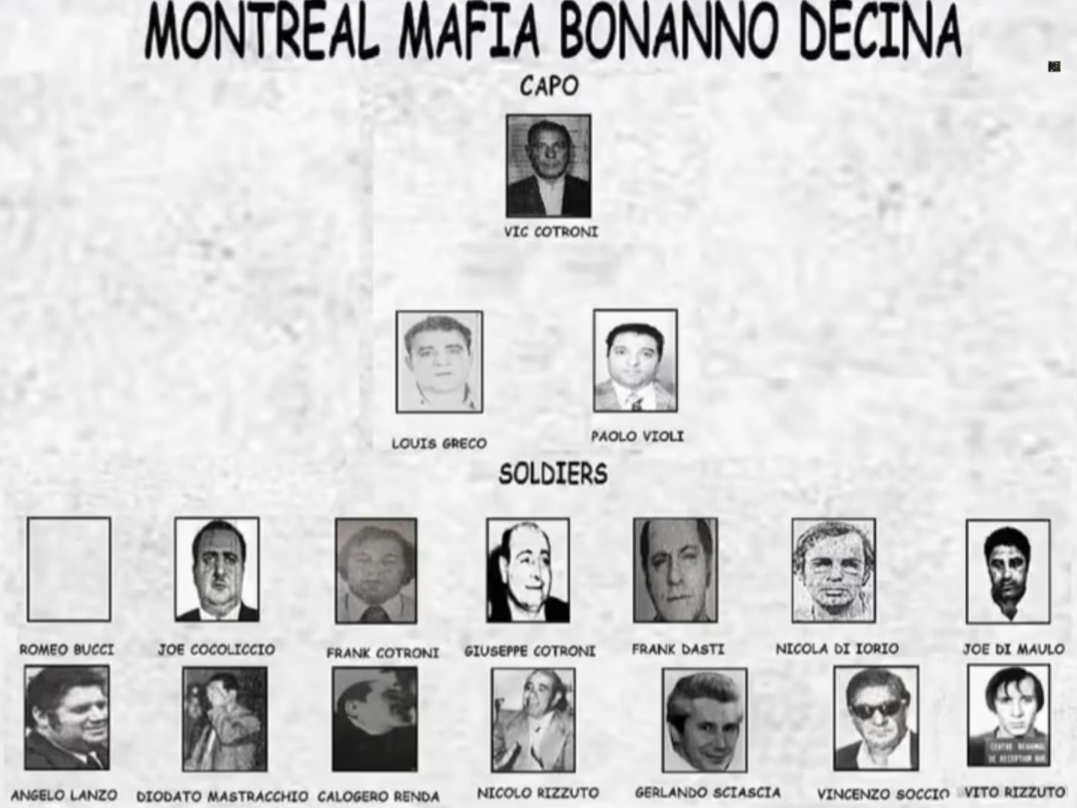
Royal Canadian Mounted Police chart of the Bonanno crime family's crew (decina) in Montreal

Violi was born in Sinopoli, Calabria on 6 February 1931. He was born into the mob; his father Domenico Violi was the head of the 'Ndrangheta Violi clan in Sinopoli. Violi later immigrated to Southern Ontario in 1951. On 24 May 1955, he fatally shot Natale Brigante in Toronto, sustaining a stab wound from Brigante. He was charged with manslaughter in a Welland court, but was acquitted, claiming it was self-defense, showing the stab wound as evidence. Violi testified at his trial that both he and Brigante were pimps and the dispute that led to the killing was about the control of a prostitute. However, it is believed that Brigante was murdered as part of a bloodfeud, with one policeman saying, "I'm sure [Violi] was told 'Take care of this problem for us'. Otherwise he never would have shot up [in status] the way he did."

Violi gained Canadian citizenship in 1956, and by the early 1960s was running illegally manufactured liquor from Ontario to Quebec. He became associated with Giacomo Luppino, boss of the Luppino family in Hamilton, but left for Montreal in 1963 on Luppino's orders to avoid clashes with another Hamilton mobster, Johnny Papalia. On 10 July 1965, Violi married Grazia Luppino, the daughter of Giacomo, in Hamilton with Vincenzo "Vic" Cotroni, boss of the Cotroni family, serving as the best man at the wedding. Cotroni served as the godfather to one of Violi's children with Papalia and Paul Volpe both serving as godfathers to the other children. Further expanding his reach was that the Commisso brothers married another of Luppino's daughters, thereby making an alliance with the Commisso 'ndrina.

In Quebec, Violi opened the Reggio Bar in Saint-Leonard in the mid-1960s, which he used as a base for extortion. Stefano Magaddino, the boss of the Buffalo family, saw Violi as his "beachhead" who would win Montreal for him from the rival Bonanno family. Violi was closely associated with Frank Cotroni and became known as "The Don of St. Leonard". In the 1960s and 1970s, Vic Cotroni used associate William "Obie" Obront to supervise a bookmaking network in the Ottawa-Hull area that handled around $50,000 in bets per day, with 25 percent going to Violi. Obie also served as Cotroni's chief banker and financial adviser, responsible for laundering money. For Montreal's Expo 67, Obront also helped the Cotronis land the meat and vending machine supply contract; most of the meat turned out to be tainted.

Violi saw himself as the future boss of the Cotroni family and in private he mocked Cotroni as a weak leader. Violi told Luppino in a phone conversation that the police listened into, "I already know that Cotroni is weak...I told him, Compare ["Godfather"], I am with you 100 percent, but only if you are sincere. Otherwise, I won't be 100 percent with you." In another wiretapped phone conversation with Luppino, Violi berated Bill Bonanno, the son of Joseph Bonanno, as he stated, "I told you that if I was to know that Bonanno was coming up again, I would tell him what a dishonest man he is. I would have gone myself and shown him what I thought of him...I would have told him, 'I'm not with you nor with him. I'm by myself. I don't want to have anything to do with anyone, because you're all a bunch of bastards'. The way things stand today that the abboccatoes [regions] will split and everyone will be on their own. I'm telling you that, in Montreal, we will be alone by ourselves." Violi's brash, cocky and arrogant approach and lack of respect for his elders did not make him friends in the underworld.

=== Underboss ===
In the early 1970s, Cotroni transferred the day-to-day activities of the family to his Calabrian compatriot Violi, a capodecina together with Nicolas Di Iorio, Frank Cotroni and Luigi Greco. Cotroni's role became more that of an adviser to the younger Calabrian. Greco led the Sicilian faction of the family until his death in 1972.

In December 1970, his bar was bugged with wiretaps by Robert Ménard, an undercover police officer who used the alias Robert Wilson, who rented an apartment above Violi's Reggio Bar for several years. Ménard was supposed to go undercover for only three months, but instead served undercover for about five years. The evidence he acquired was later used in subsequent cases.

Ménard under his Wilson identity hardly spoke at all to Violi during his first two years as his tenant and was most surprised when Violi wanted to speak over a meal of pizza and wine. Ménard described Violi as a "better class of criminals" than the French-Canadian bank robbers who shot most of his leg. Ménard stated that Violi's eyes had "intelligence, but ruthlessness. Total ruthlessness. Paolo would kill, but he'd do it in a much more intelligent way...You want to know the difference? They [French-Canadian bank robbers] will kill you indiscriminately, for no reason, while Paolo would kill you if he had to for power and for position and for advantage. That's the difference...They'll [French-Canadian bank robbers] kill because they don't like you having a toothpick in your mouth. That's the difference here. Goddamn animals. Nothing else...Paolo will use killing as a means to an end, a method. If you kill someone that you're trying to gather money from–unless you want to use him as an example–what the hell's the use use of killing a source of revenue?...That's not businesslike. Real smart guys don't kill until it absolutely has to be done."

Ménard usually talked with Violi every Saturday morning over numerous cups of coffee. Ménard learned that he was a staunch federalist who detested Quebec separatism. Riots had erupted in September 1969 when the Saint-Leonard school board changed the language of instruction for Italian Canadian children from English to French. Several Italian Canadian school teachers who continued to teach in English received death threats, and Violi told Ménard that he provided bodyguards to the teachers. Ménard recalled, "God, he hated the PQ party! I think he hated them more than the cops. He just hated them! He thought they were destroying Canada...He was very nationalistic. He spoke English a lot."

Ménard recalled that Violi was the neighbourhood leader in Saint-Leonard as he recalled, "There was some fear. He was like the don. He was like the godfather. I can remember some old people going over and kissing his hand...I guess it was a mark of respect. He was always bowed to. I'm not saying it was grandiose. It was little things." Violi received a steady steam of visitors at the Reggio Bar, mostly from New York and Hamilton. Ménard stated, "There would always be some big cars from the States and there would always be somebody there. All the time. It was like a parade. It was like a doctor's office with patients. You know, he'd be receiving in the afternoons. A car from New York. A car from New Jersey. A car from Ontario. God, all kinds of big, huge cars. They'd be parked. The guys would come in. Sometimes he'd greet them at the door. And they'd be on their way after a bit." Violi played the role of a community leader within the Italian Canadian community in Montreal, serving as a banker, judge and community mediator. He was known for providing free ice cream to children at the Reggio Bar, and he would never permit anyone to swear in front of children. However, his apparent generosity was self-interested as any favour he provided such as a loan or resolving a business dispute came with the understanding that he was entitled to favours in return. Ménard discovered, much to his shock, that after the owner of a pizzeria saw him talking with Violi in the street, he had refused to charge him for the pizza he just ordered, saying that any friend of Violi's was entitled to permanent free pizza from his pizzeria.

In early July 1973, Violi paid an extended visit to Italy to see his first cousin and childhood friend, Domenico Barbino. Late on in the same month, John Paul Getty III, the so-called "golden hippie", was kidnapped. Getty was the grandson of the American oil tycoon Jean Paul Getty, who was the world's richest man at the time. Getty finally paid his grandson's ransom after his right ear was cut off and mailed to his parents with the warning that more body parts would be severed if the ransom was not paid. As Barbino was one of the kidnappers of Getty and he was constantly on the phone with his cousin in Montreal, it is believed that Violi was in some way involved in the kidnapping. After Getty finally paid the $17 million ransom for his grandson, Violi laundered the ransom money for Barbino via investments in Montreal.

On 10 July 1973, the Popeyes motorcycle gang killed Mario Ciambrone and Salvatore Sergi of the Cotroni family for selling them low quality heroin at a premium price. On 31 July 1973, Violi met with Frank Cotroni who called the Popeyes "crazy, crazy, crazy...They've killed something like ten guys already!" It was agreed that Frank should handle the bikers while Violi would handle Angelo Faquino, the intermediary drug dealer. On 2 September 1973, Faquino was killed while walking down the street.

Much to Violi's disgust, Frank spent too much time planning out an attack on the bikers as he was very concerned about the possibility of innocent by-standers being killed and never actually carried out the assignment. In a conversation recorded by a police wiretap, Violi was heard saying, "He [Frank] should have gone into the club, clients or no clients, lined everybody up against the wall and rat-a-tat-tat." On 14 September 1973, a Cotroni family piciotto, Toni Di Genova, was killed by the Popeyes, which led to calls within the family to "take care of the Frenchmen once and for all." At a meeting at the Windsor Hotel attended by Violi, Vic Cotorni and Joe DiMaulo, it was decided to end the war with the Popeyes, which was felt to be adverse for business. Even though it was Violi who decided to end the war, he continued to lash out at Frank Cotroni, who he felt should have massacred the Popeyes.

On 20 August 1973, Natale "Joe Diamond" Evola, the boss of the Bonanno family, died of cancer. Violi went to New York to participate in the election for the new boss, and was overjoyed when the candidate he supported, Philip "Rusty" Rastelli, won. Rastelli promised to send more men to Montreal to replace those in prison, and Violi felt confident of Rastelli's support.

A power struggle between the Calabrian and Sicilian factions of the family began in 1973. Violi complained about the independent modus operandi of his Sicilian "underlings", Nicolò Rizzuto in particular. "He is going from one side to the other, here and there, and he says nothing to nobody, he is doing business and nobody knows anything," Violi said about Rizzuto. Violi asked for more "soldiers" from his Bonanno bosses, clearly preparing for war, and Violi's boss at the time, Vic Cotroni remarked, "Me, I'm capodecina. I got the right to expel." Violi requested permission from the New York bosses to kill Rizzuto, but the request was turned down.

In 1974, Violi and Cotroni were overheard on a police wiretap threatening to kill Hamilton mobster Johnny Papalia and demanding $150,000 after he used their names in a $300,000 extortion plot without notifying or cutting them in on the score. The three were convicted of extortion in 1975 and sentenced to six years in prison. Violi and Cotroni appealed and got their sentences reduced to six months, but Papalia's appeal was rejected.

The following year, Violi was arrested to stand before the Quebec government's Commission d'enquête sur le crime organisé (CECO) inquiry into organized crime; he was sent to jail for one year for contempt.

The testimony heard during the CECO hearings proved damaging to Violi's reputation. One Montreal businessman, Mauro Marchettini, testified that Violi's younger brother, Francesco Violi, threatened his life for opening a poolroom close to the Reggio Bar owned by Violi as Francesco warned that his brother did not want competition. Marchettini testified that he went to a meeting with Francesco, who "...began slapping me in the face. He did it in a very calm way, without too much force. All the while he was giving me advice about how I shouldn't open there. Then he started hitting me on the shoulders with a four-foot-long stick used to mix ice cream. And he kicked me in the face. I was bleeding from the mouth and I had a broken tooth and both eyes were blackened." Marchettini ended up selling his poolroom to a Violi associate who promptly shut it down.

Another Italian immigrant businessman testified behind a mask, as he wished to remain anonymous, that he was forced at gunpoint to go to the basement of the Reggio Bar to see Violi. He testified, "I was suffering. We were making sacrifices, my wife more than I. Sometimes there were days when we had nothing to eat. I didn't want to sign them [the protection money cheques]. Paolo had a cigar in his mouth. He told me: 'Sign!'. I cried like a child. I had worked on my business for fifteen years and they ate it all." The businessman stated that the protection money payments ruined his business and forced him into bankruptcy.

Lino Simaglia, an Italian immigrant businessman, testified at CECO that Violi had visited him in 1971 and forced him to pay $1,000 per year in protection money. Simiglia testified that for Christmas 1971, "At Christmas, Violi called saying I had to give him a gift...$1,000 in cash. My business wasn't good. I couldn't afford to pay my debts or buy Christmas presents for my wife and children".

One of Violi's "soldiers", Peter Bianco, who had turned Crown's evidence, testified against his former boss at the CECO hearings. Bianco testified that his area of expertise was robbing wedding presents, saying, "We mostly did Italian weddings. We cleaned out the house while the people were at church." Bianco's testimony was supported by a wiretapped phone call where Violi called him and his partner, Tony Teoli, "a pair of no-goods" who had only stolen "nothing but cheap stuff."

Another piece of evidence introduced during the CECO hearings was a bugged phone call Violi had made to Cotroni in 1973 where, amid much laughter, he cheerfully confessed to attempted murder as he told his boss, "I shot the asshole three times. The papers didn't say so, but I'm telling you it was me, with another soldier, who went into the apartment. He was sleeping and boom, boom, I shot him three times." Violi's only regret was that he failed to kill the man, but he took consolation from the fact that "They say he's still got two [bullets in the head] and they can't get them out. But he'll remain crippled...It's worse than being dead." Violi then went on to complain at length that his 9mm handgun was not large enough for his tastes and he wanted a .22-calibre handgun for the next time that he shot someone.

Violi was a braggart who claimed to Cotroni that he committed crimes done by others and the police knew that this particular attempted murder was the work of someone else. The wiretap put Violi into the dilemma of having to confess to attempted murder or having to confess that he lied to his boss (a serious offense under the Mafia code); Violi chose the former during his testimony as he maintained that he really did shoot the man. One of Ménard's recordings had Violi say that 25 members of the Cotroni family reported to him directly and that he had about 1,000 men under his command. A mystery witness at CECO who wore a mask testified that Violi is "all-powerful God. Paolo Violi is 1,000 men".

A recording made by Ménard on 5 December 1973 showed that Violi was confident that his office was not bugged and he mocked the CECO inquiry, saying in a contemptuous tone, "They're running around, butting in, and their balls are in an uproar because they don't know anything." As the recordings were played in the inquiry room, Violi sat looking glum and stunned.

During his own testimony, Violi portrayed himself as a victim and refused to answer any of the questions from the commissioners in a substantial manner. When convicted of contempt, Violi said, "I don't refuse to testify, but I have absolutely nothing to say to this court."

The CEHO hearings destroyed Violi's reputation and paved the way for his murder. The police wiretaps revealed that Violi kept boasting with hubristic arrogance that it was not possible for the police to wiretap him and that the way that the police wiretaps showed him making disparaging and insulting remarks about his superiors in Montreal and New York significantly damaged his reputation. Peter Edwards, the crime correspondent of The Toronto Star wrote, "The wiretap conversations had shown that Violi didn't measure up to the traditional Mafia standards of leadership. He was clearly a braggart and was indiscreet. Perhaps, worse of all, he showed himself to be a petty criminal who didn't balk at having his soldiers steal from Little Italy brides as he attended their weddings, a man whose actions deprived St. Leonard children of gifts at Christmas." The journalist Jerry Langton wrote that the Ménard tapes had destroyed Violi's underworld reputation and made him "...in many eyes, the equivalent of a rat by incompetence".

== Mob war and death ==
In 1977, Rizzuto and Violi met face-to-face in a gesture to resolve their differences, according to a police report, but the peace talks failed, and most of the Rizzuto family fled to Venezuela.

This led to a mob war in Montreal that began with the murder of Violi's consigliere, Pietro Sciara, on Valentine's Day in 1976; Sciara's body was left in the street after seeing an Italian-dubbed version of The Godfather Part II with his wife. Just under a year later, on 8 February 1977, Francesco Violi, the younger brother of Paolo, the family enforcer, was murdered by several shotgun blasts.

Shortly after Violi was released from the brief jail sentence with relation to the CECO inquiry, he sold his bar to brothers Vincenzo and Giuseppe Randisi; the name was changed to Bar Jean-Talon. Just under a year after Francesco Violi's murder, on 22 January 1978, Paolo Violi was shot in the head at close range with a lupara in the Bar Jean-Talon after being invited to play cards by Vincenzo Randisi. As Violi sat playing cards, two men wearing ski masks stormed in while one shouted "everybody to the floor!" while the other one raced up to Violi to shoot him dead from behind at very close range with a sawed-off 12-gauge shotgun. The first shot blasted off much of Violi's head and killed him instantly; nevertheless, the killer fired a second shot to further destroy Violi's head in a show of disrespect.

The murder weapon was a Zardini shotgun, a rare type of handmade shotgun manufactured in the village of Zardini in Italy and which requires pellets larger than those designed for the standard shotgun size. The most distinctive feature of the Zardini shotgun is that the two barrels are not placed horizontally as is normally the case, but rather vertically, making the Zardini an easily recognizable shotgun. The lupara had been sawed off so closely as to resemble an oversized pistol, and to fire such a weapon with dexterity without losing control required an assassin accustomed to firing such a gun. The Zardini shotgun is an expensive shotgun and is most often used in Mafia murders. It remains unclear why the Zardini shotgun was chosen as the murder weapon over a normal shotgun, which would have been easily obtained in North America and would have much less costly after the murder weapon was disposed of. The most popular theory is that the Zardini lupara is associated with the Sicilian Mafia and it was the Sicilian Rizzuto's way of obliquely taking credit for Violi's murder.

Violi's funeral was five days later at the Church of the Madonna della Difesa, and was buried at Notre Dame des Neiges Cemetery in Montreal. In a sign of disfavour, only a few gangsters attended the funeral. Violi's father-in-law, Giacomo Luppino of Hamilton, together with Michele "Mike" Racco of Toronto and Frank Sylvestro of Guelph, were the only non-Montreal Mafiosi to make the trip to Montreal to attend Violi's funeral. No Mafiosi from New York attended the funeral, though Carmine Galante sent a funeral wreath. Vic Cotroni attended the funeral, but refused to speak to Violi's grieving family. Edwards wrote about Cotroni's role in the murder that he "...gave his grudging approval, knowing a refusal might add his name to the assassins' hit list. Vic Cotroni was not one to buck New York and any hit on Violi had to be sanctioned from the United States."

=== Aftermath ===
Although Nicolò Rizzuto was in Venezuela at the time of Violi's murder, his brother-in-law Domenico Manno was believed to play a major role in the murder on Rizzuto's orders. The three hitmen who killed Violi, Agostino Cuntrera, Giovanni DiMora, and Domenico Manno, all made guilty pleas to the charges of conspiracy to murder Violi as the Crown dropped the charges of first-degree murder against them as part of the plea bargain. Cuntrera, Manno and DiMora observed omertà and refused to name who hired them, but the police had observed that the three men often talked with Nicolò Rizzuto. The Montreal Gazette in an editorial condemned the plea bargains where it was declared, "For society to let people off with punishment this light-under a seven year term, a prisoner is eligible for parole after two-is almost to sanction the planning of executions...All this adult life, Paolo Violi worked to undermine respect for the law. Now, even in death, it would appear that he has accomplished the same."

Manno received a seven-year sentence after pleading guilty to conspiring to kill Violi. Rizzuto confidant Agostino Cuntrera was also prosecuted, receiving a five-year sentence in relation to Violi's murder. The war ended on 17 October 1980, when Rocco Violi, the last of Violi's brothers, was seated, for a family meal, at his kitchen table in his Montreal home when a single bullet from a sniper's rifle struck him dead. Cotroni died of cancer on 16 September 1984. By the mid-1980s, the Rizzuto family emerged as Montreal's pre-eminent crime family after the turf war.

After Paolo Violi's death, his widow and two sons, Domenico (Dom) and Giuseppe (Joe) moved to Hamilton, an area controlled by the Buffalo family and 'Ndrangheta families. A 2002 Halton Police report suggested the Violi brothers were affiliated with the Luppino-Violi crime family in Hamilton started by their grandfather Giacomo Luppino. Domenico Violi subsequently became the underboss of the Buffalo crime family in 2017; the first Canadian to hold the second-highest position in the American Mafia. In July 2023, Grandchild to Paolo Violi was targeted in Niagara Falls On and stabbed 12 times around 8:13 pm on the corner of Oakwood dr McLeod Rd. The attacker was found and arrested for attempted murder nickname Alice Wonder.https://x.com/shanermurph/status/1679284898916384769.

== Books ==
- Edwards, Peter (1990). Blood Brothers: How Canada's Most Powerful Mafia Family Runs Its Business. Toronto: Key Porter Books. ISBN 155013213X.
- Langton, Jerry (2015). Cold War How Organized Crime Works in Canada and Why It's About to Get More Violent. Toronto: HarperColllins. ISBN 978-1-4434-3255-9.
