= Center for Research-Action on Race Relations =

Canadian civil rights organization

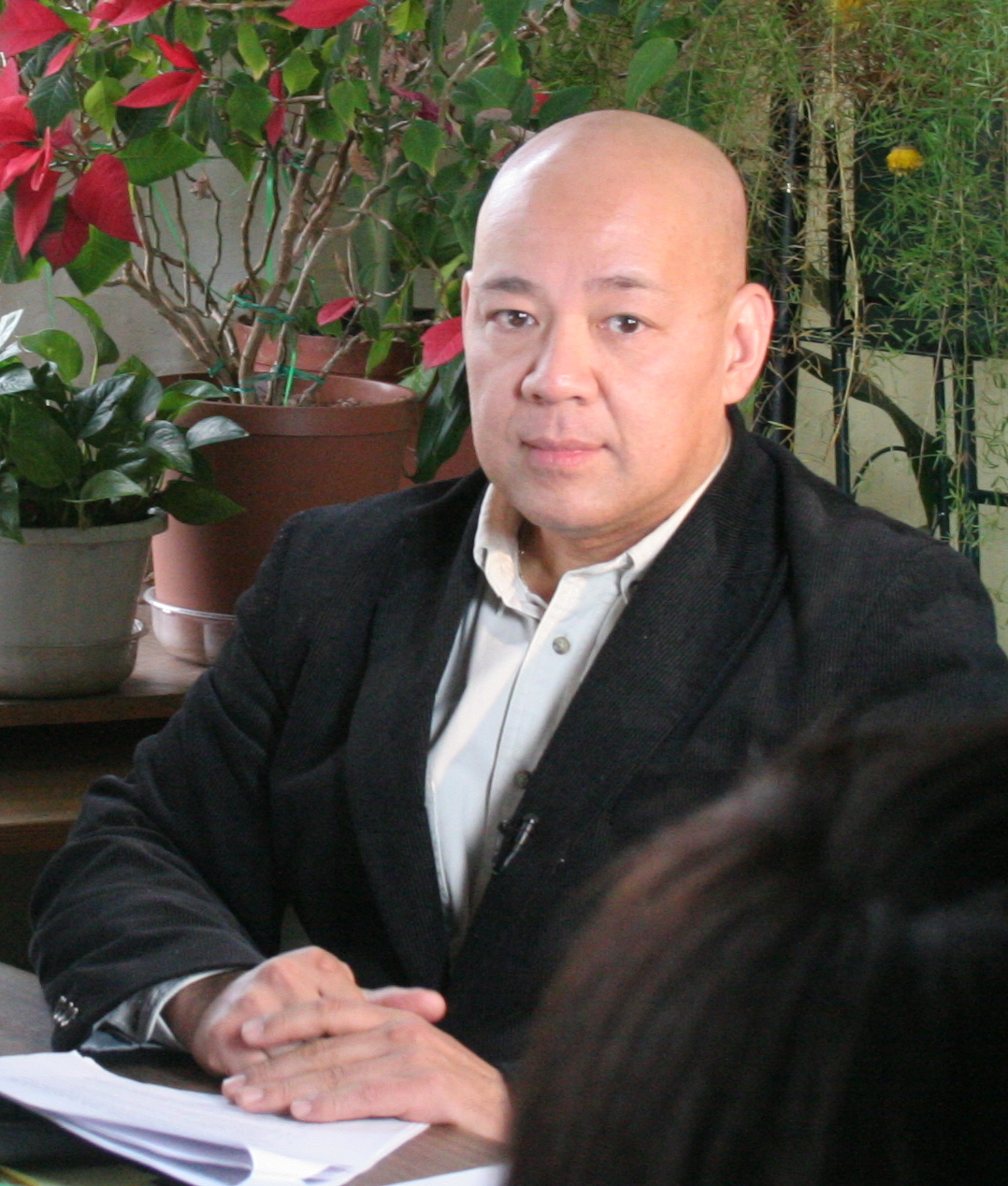
Fo Niemi in the CRARR offices in 2010

The Center for Research-Action on Race Relations (CRARR) is a Canadian, non-profit civil rights organization committed to promoting racial harmony and equality. The organization functions as a service for victims of discrimination through activities involving advocacy, research and legal representation. It is considered a leader among non-profit organizations of its type in Canada.

The CRARR has supported and assisted over 250 victims of discrimination since its inception in 1983. It takes on approximately 75 new cases per year. The majority of individuals aided come from the Montreal area, however, assistance is not limited to this region.

== History ==
The organization was founded in 1983 in Montreal, Quebec, Canada and while it has expanded the reach of its work to other parts of Canada, it maintains its base in Montreal. It was co-founded by Fo Niemi, who has maintained the title of executive director since the organization's creation.

== Mission statement ==
The organization's motto is "United for Diversity and Racial Equality." Its mandate, broadly speaking, is "to promote racial harmony and equality in Canada". The organization is actively engaged in promoting equality and multicultural representation in Canada through various activities. As such, the CRARR has a strong commitment to promoting racial equality, believing that "When it comes to real inclusion—real integration, real presence in decision-making positions—we still have a fairly long way to go". This position demonstrates the organization's belief that underrepresentation of minorities is a social injustice that must be corrected.

The CRARR's areas of expertise include discrimination and harassment in employment; discrimination in school discipline; hate crimes and hate incidents; hate on the internet; homophobia; media bias; racial profiling in public services and employment; systemic racism and critical race analysis and union misrepresentation.

== Current activities ==
i. Services and Activities
The organization's goals are largely focused on policy interventions, public education and mobilization, promotion and recognition, research-action, and training and consulting. More specifically, the organization offers a wide range of services and activities, including:

a. Advocacy and defence for victims of discrimination based on race, religion, ethnic or national origin, citizenship status and related characteristics.

b. Charter research and litigation on racial equality issues

c. Conferences, consultations and seminars on different race relations and equality rights issues

d. Research-action projects on systemic racism and on racial minorities’ needs

e. Interventions and advocacy before legislative, administrative, regulatory and judicial agencies.

In addition, the organization also honours an individual or non-profit organization with its bi-annual Frederick Johnson award. Past recipients include Hank Avery, African-Canadian who pushed for the recognition of a black slave's cemetery in Quebec, the organization Mothers United Against Racism and Hon. Irwin Cotler, Canada's former Minister of Justice and Attorney-General.

In 2004-2005, the CRARR hosted a conference on youth crime prevention. Additionally, the organization hosts an annual lecture on Diversity in Canadian Media that is co-sponsored by the department of Communication Studies at Concordia University in Montreal.

ii. Recent Activities
The CRARR, represented by Civil Rights Advocate Elena Toews, is currently assisting two groups of black residents of Southwest Montreal who have filed claims with the Quebec Human Rights Commission. The individuals, Samantha Hyman-Roberts and Gallo Cham, have claimed that they were both racially profiled and abused by transit authorities after failing to show proof that they had purchased transit tickets. Both Hyman-Roberts and Cham are asking for $50,000 and $30,000, respectively. The complaints are currently in the process of being filed on behalf of the individuals by the CRARR.

iii. Past Successes
The CRARR has been granted intervener status in two discrimination cases reviewed by the Supreme Court of Canada. One was Lavoie v. Canada (2002) which discussed giving preference to citizens over non-citizens for government jobs. As intervener, the CRARR argued that the practice was discriminatory and "the preference operated in a particularly invidious way with respect to women." The CRARR argued that many women keep foreign citizenship out of practical considerations, such as maintain the ability to return to their former country to take care of elderly parents. The reality that citizens receive preference over non-citizens is contrary to the federal action plan, Embracing Change, that was created in 2000 to increase the representation of visible minorities in the federal public service which can often include non-citizens.

In addition, the organization has also achieved the following:

-intervened in a number of cases before the Canadian and Quebec Human Rights Commissions and helped victims of racism receive over $400,000 in damages through various court cases -won a case before the Canadian Human Rights Tribunal against a man in British Columbia who was affiliated with a neo-Nazi website -aided a number of individuals in filing complaints against discriminatory and unethical police and transit authority behavior.

== Current organizational features ==
i. Employees/Volunteers
The staff currently consists of three people led by the executive director, Fo Niemi, who co-founded the organization in 1983. In addition to the executive director, the organization also has a counsellor for victims of discrimination, a legal counsellor and a communication and research officer. The organization attracts interns who study in law, political science, social work and communications. At least six lawyers are associated with and work closely to the rest of the CRARR team in addition to a number of other experts across Canada who lend their expertise and advice to the organization.

ii. Funding
As a non-profit organization, the CRARR receives funding from a range of both public and private institutions. This includes the government of Canada, businesses, unions, educational institutions, as well as donations from private individuals. In 2007, the organization received a contribution from Canada's Department of Justice in the amount of $67,000 CAD.

iii. Partners
The CRARR is affiliated with a number of governmental and non-governmental actors. Governmental parties include the Department of Canadian Heritage, Human Resources and Skills Development Canada, the Ministry of Immigration and Cultural Communities of Quebec, the National Crime Prevention Strategy and the Secrétariat à l’action communautaire autonome du Québec. Some non-governmental partners include the Royal Bank of Canada, Banque Nationale, CHUM Ltd., Canadian Auto Workers, the National Council of Visible Minorities in the Federal Public Service, the Canadian Jewish Congress, and the Canadian Race Relations Foundation.

== See also ==
- Canadian values
