= Octave Crémazie =

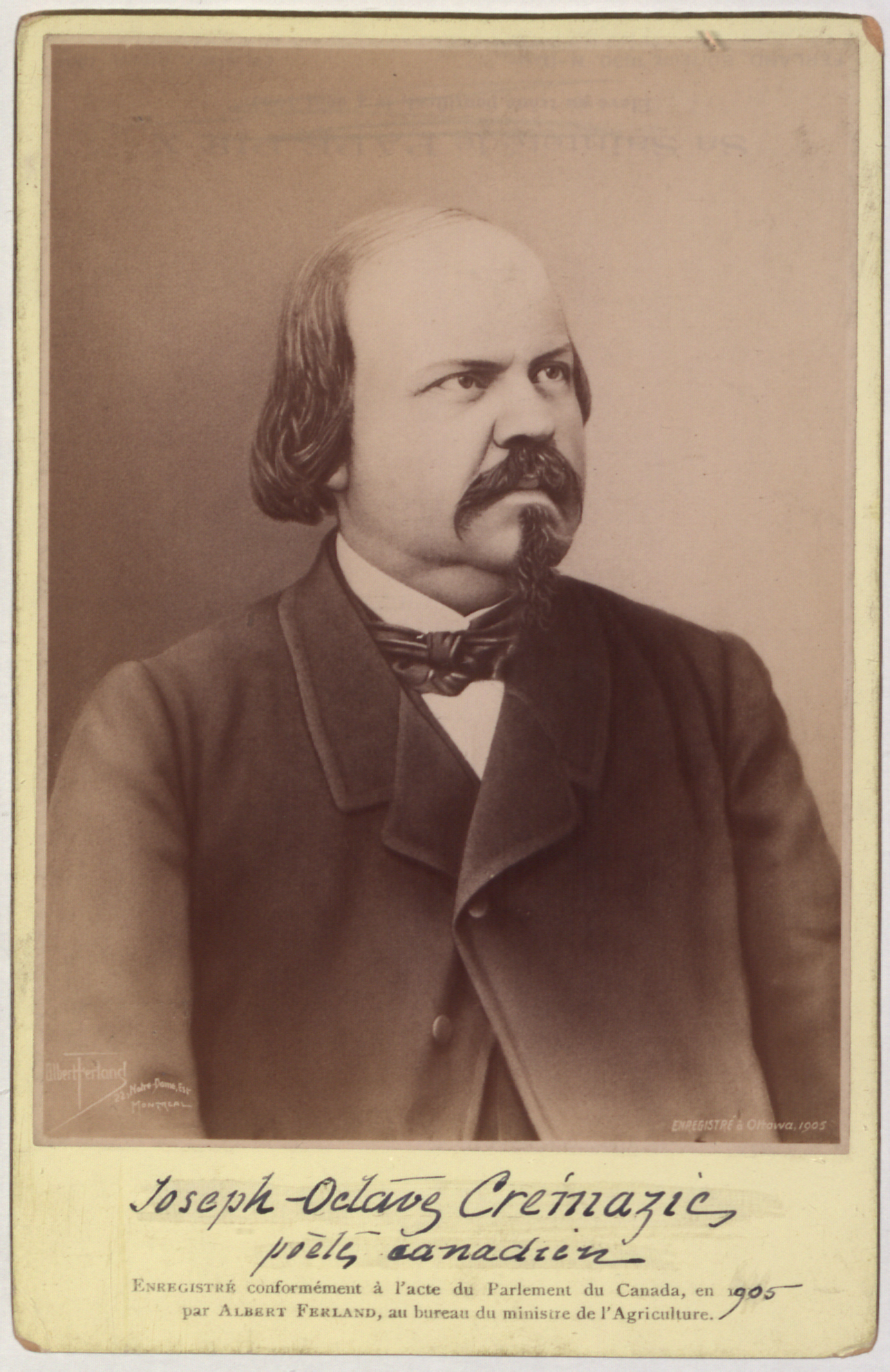
- Born: April 16, 1827; Quebec City, Lower Canada
- Died: January 16, 1879 (aged 51); Le Havre, France
- Occupations: Poet, bookseller
- Writing career
- Language: French
- Genre: Poetry

Octave Crémazie (French pronunciation: [ɔktav kʁemazi]; April 16, 1827 – January 16, 1879) was a French Canadian poet and bookseller born in Quebec City. Recognized both during and after his lifetime for his patriotic verse and his significant role in the cultural development of Quebec, Crémazie has been called "the father of French Canadian poetry."

Octave was the youngest of the four surviving children of Jacques Crémazie and Marie-Anne Miville. From 1836 to 1844, he was a student at the Seminary of Quebec, where the priest John Holmes (American priest) introduced him to the works of the French Romantic writers. Alfred de Musset, Alphonse de Lamartine, and Victor Hugo, in particular, had a profound influence on the future poet.

After finishing his studies at the Seminary of Quebec, Crémazie went into business with his brother Joseph, a bookseller. Their shop in Quebec City, the J. et O. Crémazie bookstore, established in 1833, was instrumental in the North American dissemination of works by many Romantic writers. It was also a meeting place for the members of what would become known as Quebec's literary movement of 1860.

While still in his early twenties, Crémazie helped found the Institut canadien, an organization devoted to the promotion of French Canadian culture. He would later serve as the organization's president (from 1857 to 1858).

Crémazie's first published poems appeared in L'Ami de la religion et de la patrie (edited by his brother Jacques) and other Quebec City newspapers. Recognition for his poetry grew throughout the 1850s. As French-Canadian literature scholar Odette Condemine writes:

His nostalgic evocation of the happiness that preceded the Conquest and the miseries that followed roused his compatriots' fervour. "Le vieux soldat canadien" (1855) and "Le Drapeau de Carillon" (1858) were enthusiastically received and won Crémazie his title as "national bard."

The longing for a glorious, vanished past and the sense of estrangement from France in Crémazie's work has prompted the critic Gilles Marcotte to describe it as a poetry of exile.

Despite the popularity of his bookstore, Octave Crémazie's extravagant taste for foreign commodities led to large debts and trouble with creditors. By 1862, his financial situation had become so dire that he fled to France in secret, leaving the bookstore bankrupt. He lived at different times in Paris, Bordeaux, and Le Havre under the name of Jules Fontaine, poor and isolated despite having secured a modest job and the support of a few French friends.

Crémazie's poetic production stopped when he left Quebec. The documents that survive from his later years include his Journal du siège de Paris, a diary detailing the hardship that Parisians and Crémazie himself endured during the siege of the capital in 1870 and 1871. Many of his letters to close friends and family members also survive, including his correspondence with the priest Raymond Casgrain, to whom Crémazie often expressed his ideas about literature.

Octave Crémazie died in Le Havre on January 16, 1879.

Œuvres complètes, a volume of Crémazie's poems and letters edited by Raymond Casgrain, was published in 1882 by the Beauchemin bookstore in Montreal and the Institut canadien de Québec. The book included the following remarks: "In a word, the publishers wanted this book to stand as the most enduring monument that could be raised to the memory of the most patriotic, and indeed the most hapless, of our poets."

A statue depicting a French Canadian soldier stands in Montreal's Saint-Louis Square (Rue de Malines and Saint-Denis) with Crémazie's name across the top and the years 1827–1879 (his years of birth and death). Underneath the soldier are the words: Pour mon drapeau je viens ici mourir (literally: "For my flag I come here to die"). There is also a Montreal metro station named for him on the orange line, located on the boulevard likewise named in his honour.

== See also ==
- List of Quebec authors
