= Humira Saqib =

Afghan journalist and activist

- Born: 1980 (age 44–45); Kabul, Afghanistan
- Occupation(s): Journalist, women's rights activist
- Known for: Editor of the magazine Negah-e-Zan (A Vision of Women)

Humira Saqib (Dari: حمیرا ثاقب; born 1980) is an Afghan journalist and women's human rights activist. Through her writings in the magazine Negah-e-Zan (A Vision of Women) and in Afghan Women's News Agency, she has been protesting against extreme forms of harassment against women in her radically Islamic country. She has pleaded for parliament to enact laws for the elimination of violence against women. Saqib pursues her efforts to further women's rights by working for the women's news agency as a writer and editor.

== Biography ==
Saqeb was born in Afghanistan in 1980. According to the prevalent practice in the country her parents got her married off while still a teenager. She was happy with the marriage and had three girls while still in her 20s. She concurrently completed her college education and obtained a degree in psychology from the Kabul University, as her husband was supportive. She considered herself fortunate in this respect as in her country, a very patriarchal society, only boys had preference for education in private or public schools while girls were mostly ignored.

Saqib started publication of the magazine Negah-e-Zan (A Vision of Women) in Kabul in May 2010 with intent to educate women in her country on their rights and to "tell women that we have great ideas, and the ability to make those ideas a reality." She published two issues of the magazine (about 3,000 copies) and circulated it free of charge to people who mattered, among the small minority of educated women (only about 20% literate as per UN estimates) in the country, and in the universities and government offices which were aware of the problems faced by women in the country. Only two issues were published in a span of 5 months. In the first edition of the magazine she was critical of the religious council in the northern Baghlan Province.

She had opposed the Ulema Council's injunction, "the misogynist fatwas", of restricting women's rights by stating that women should go out of the house only with the permission of the husband. In one edition she wrote in short passages about the time when women had enjoyed freedom in the 1920s when queen Suraiya presented herself in the public without a veil.

In one of the back covers of the magazine she had illustrated a picture of the hands of a woman with one palm showing the writing "man" and the other as "woman". The publications of her magazine were considered "radical" and resulted in aggressive action by the men who opposed such a publication by a woman. She was threatened many times on phone and her 10-year-old daughter was maltreated. There was even an attempt to abduct her. Her complaints to the police and administration did not receive any supportive response. The aggressors even told her "stop this magazine or we will stop you... stay home with your children, running a magazine is not a fit job for a woman". Consequently, fearing for her life, she moved to Tajikistan for one year, in 2011, where it was safe to live.

In 2013, Saqib returned to Kabul to continue her agitation but without taking any public postures. She is now running the news agency from Kabul with the objective of achieving gender equality and justice. Apart from women's issues, her agitation is also to get an enabling law passed by the Parliament to eliminate violence against women and to enable their increased participation in government and in politics. She is also pursuing actions to stop discrimination against her counterparts. She is represented on the Committee for "Afghan Women's Political Participation."

== See also ==
- Women's rights in Afghanistan
