= Service de police de la Ville de Montréal =

Police service in Montreal, Canada

- Abbreviation: SPVM
- Motto: Une équipe engagée A committed team

Agency overview
- Formed: March 15, 1843
- Annual budget: C$587 million (2014)

Jurisdictional structure
- Operations jurisdiction: Urban agglomeration of Montreal
- Area: 499.26 square kilometres (192.77 sq mi)

Operational structure
- Headquarters: 1441 Saint Urbain Street; Montreal, Quebec, Canada
- Sworn members: 4,562 (2019)
- Unsworn members: 1,356 (2019)
- Elected officer responsible: François Bonnardel, Minister of Public Security

Facilities
- Stations: 33
- Road vehicles: 1,687 (2015)
- Water vehicles: 23 (2015)
- Dogs: 35 German Shepherds; 7 Labradors

Website
- spvm.qc.ca

The Service de police de la Ville de Montréal (French pronunciation: [sɛʁvis də pɔlis də la vil də mɔ̃ʁeal], "Montreal City Police Service", abbr. SPVM) is the municipal police agency for the city of Montreal, Quebec, Canada, and the neighbouring communities in the urban agglomeration of Montreal. With over 4,500 officers and more than 1,300 civilian staff, it is the second-largest municipal police agency in Canada after the Toronto Police Service.

== History ==
The Montreal City Police Service was created on March 15, 1843. At that time, there were 51 police officers in Montreal. The first officers did not wear uniforms. In order to be recognizable as police officers by civilians, the first uniforms were created in 1848. In 1853, they won the right to carry firearms in the performance of their duties.

In the early twentieth century, the Montreal City Police Service counted 467 constables, inspectors and managers. The force was subdivided, as squads of morality and local departments were created.

The size of the police force remained roughly the same from the beginning of the century until 1930, when it hired more staff in the context of the Wall Street Crash of 1929. During the Great Depression, tens of thousands of workers lost their jobs and there was an increase in crime. In the late 1930s, the Montreal City Police Service had about 1,500 employees.

Following the progress of scientific analysis, a mobile laboratory was created in 1957. It evolved and changed in the 1980s to become the technical section. One of the most famous operations of the Montreal City Police Service was the undercover assignment of Robert Ménard between 1970-1976 who bugged the Reggio Bar owned by Paolo Violi, the underboss of the Cotroni family. The information collected by Ménard revealed much about Mafia operations in Canada, the United States and Italy.

The Museum of the Montreal Police (French: Musée de la police de Montréal) was established in 1992 to preserve the history of the Montreal City Police Service.

== Leadership ==
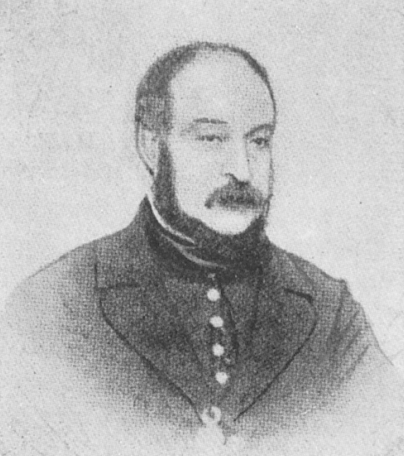
Moses Judah Hayes, Chief from 1854 to 1861

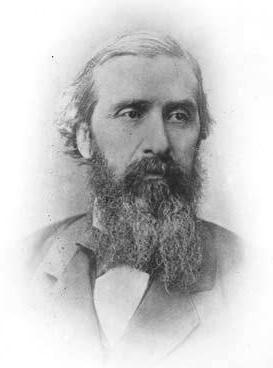
Guillaume Lamothe, Chief from 1861 to 1865

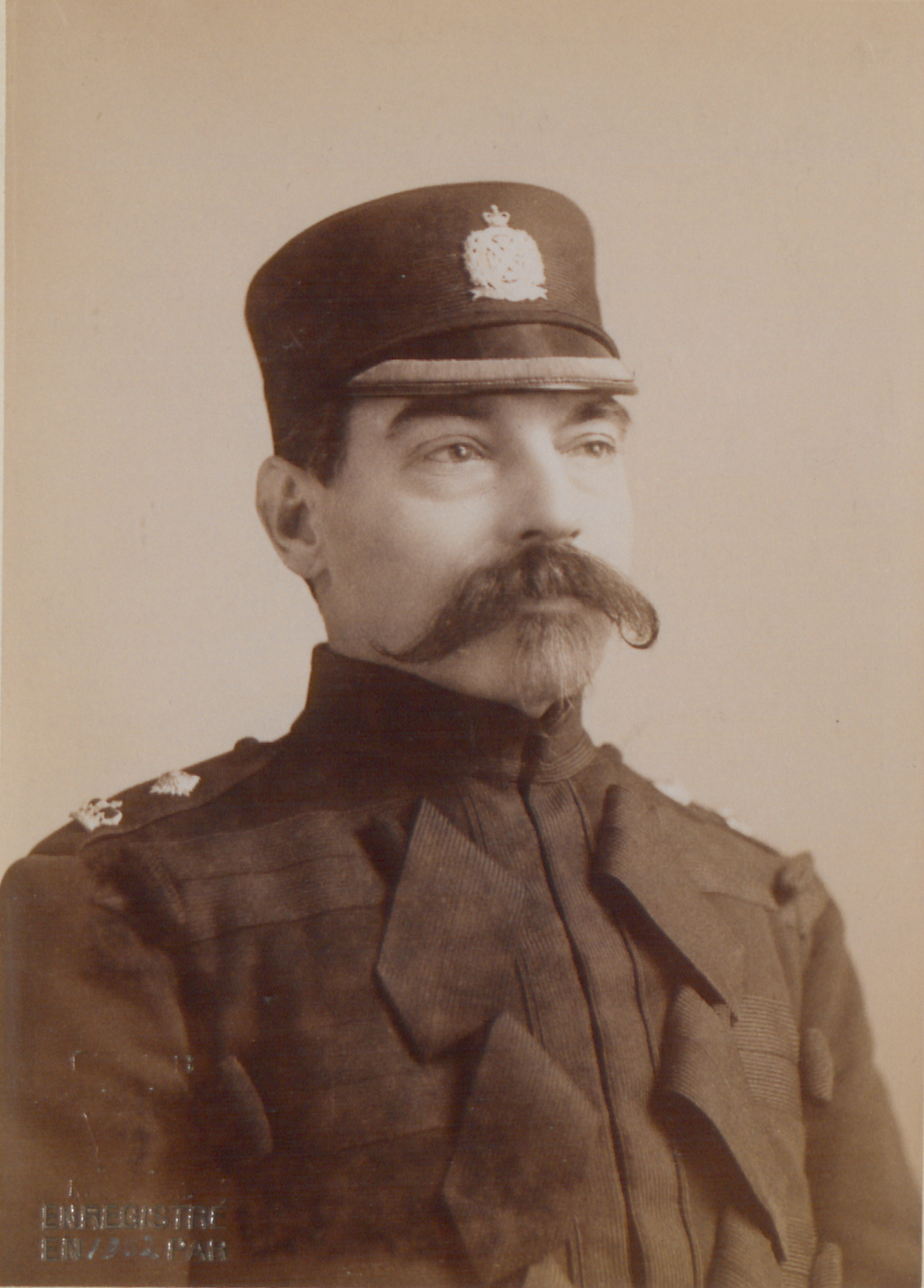
David Legault, Chief from 1901 to 1904

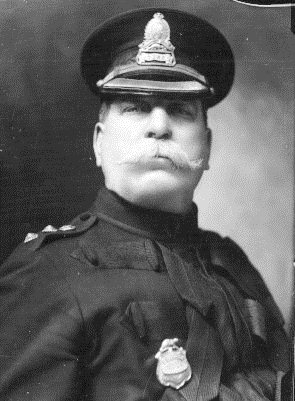
Pierre Bélanger, Chief from 1921 to 1928

The following is a list of Chiefs and Directors of the Service de police de la Ville de Montréal.

No.	Name	Term start	Term end
1.	Alexandre Comeau	1843	1844
2.	Thomas Wiley	1844	1849
3.	Hippolyte Jérémie	1849	1850
4.	Thomas McGrath	1850	1853
5.	Charles O. Ermatinger	1853	1854
6.	Moses Judah Hayes	1854	1861
7.	Guillaume Lamothe	1861	1865
8.	Fred A. Penton	1865	1879
9.	Hercule Paradis	1879	1888
10.	George A. Hughes	1888	1900
11.	David Legault	1901	1904
12.	Olivier Campeau	1904	1918
13.	Joseph Tremblay (interim)	1918	1918
14.	Pierre Bélanger	1919	1928
15.	Hulbrit Langevin	1928	1931
16.	Fernand Dufresne	1931	1946
17.	Charles Barnes (interim)	1947	1947
18.	Albert Langlois	1947	1954
19.	T.O. Leggett (interim)	1954	1956
20.	Pacifique Plante (interim)	1956	1956
21.	Albert Langlois	1957	1961
22.	Ernest Pleau (interim)	1961	1961
23.	Adrien J. Robert	1961	1965
24.	Jean-Paul Gilbert	1965	1970
25.	Marcel Saint-Aubin	1970	1971
26.	Jean-Jacques Saulnier	1971	1971
27.	Maurice Saint-Pierre (interim)	1972	1972
28.	René Daigneault	1972	1977
29.	Henri-Paul Vignola	1977	1981
30.	André De Luca	1982	1985
31.	Roland Bourget	1985	1989
32.	Alain Saint-Germain	1989	1994
33.	Jacques Duchesneau	1994	1998
34.	Claude Rochon (interim)	1998	1998
35.	Michel Sarrazin	1998	2005
36.	Yvan Delorme	2005	2010
37.	Marc Parent	2010	2015
38.	Philippe Pichet	2015	2017
39.	Martin Prud'homme (interim)	2017	2018
40.	Sylvain Caron	2018	2022
41.	Sophie Roy (interim)	2022	2023
42.	Fady Dagher	2023	Incumbent

== Organization ==
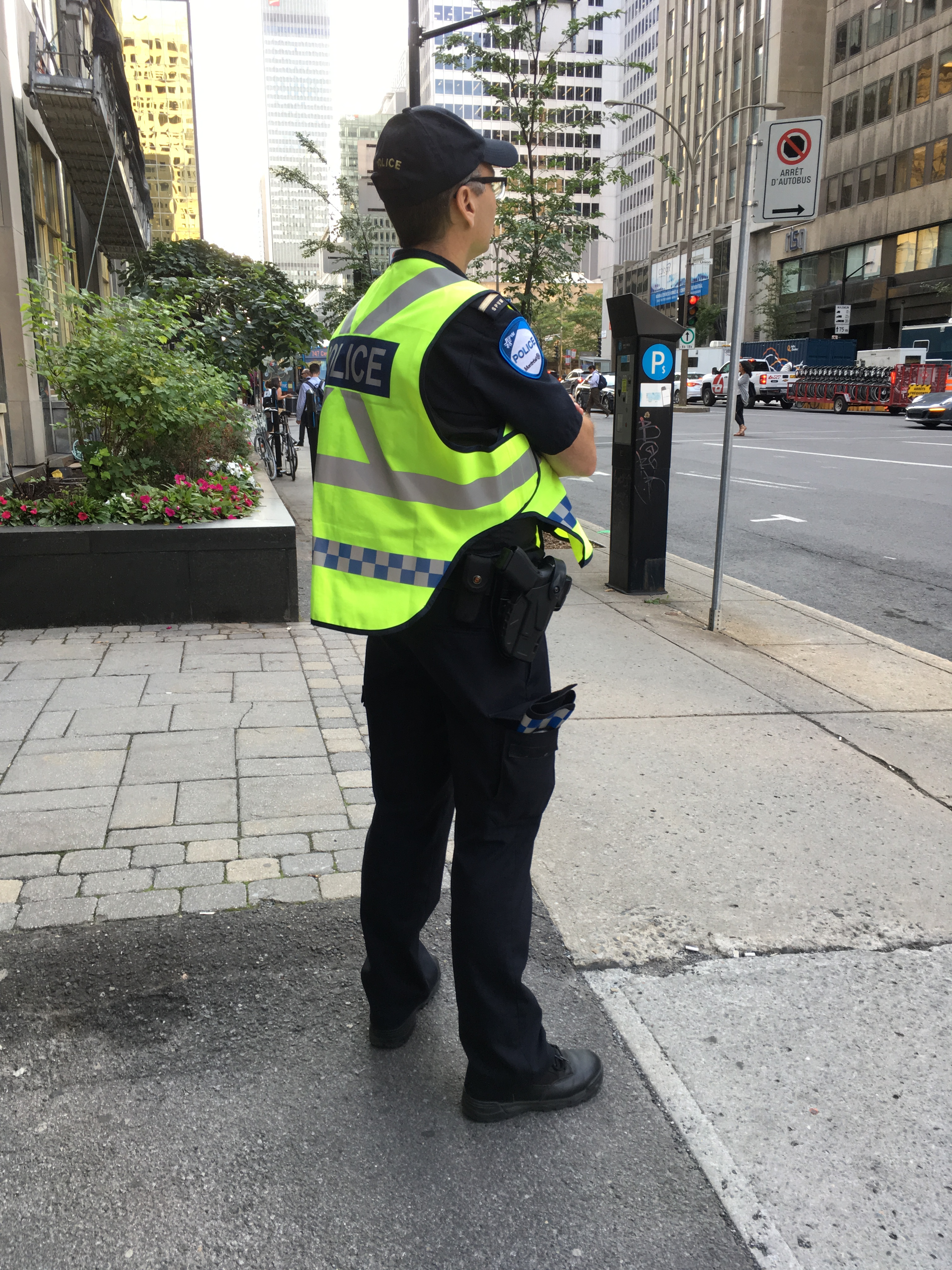
Police officer patrolling on René-Lévesque Boulevard

The SPVM is led by Fady Dagher, Director (chief of police), who took over in January 2023 from Sophie Roy, who was in an interim position after Sylvain Caron retired.

The rank structure and strength of the SPVM as of 2019 was:

- Director (1)
- Assistant Director (6)
- Chief Inspector (15)
- Inspector (25)
- Commandant (68)
- Lieutenant (47) and Detective Lieutenant (76)
- Sergeant (365) and Detective Sergeant (641)
- Constable (3,318)

Some of the police functions carried out by the service include:

- Patrol police officers
- Riot police (now called SSIS: Section Support et Intervention Spécialisé)
- Motorcycle officers
- Community relations officers
- Physical surveillance officers (shadowing)
- Section chiefs
- Investigators
- K-9 unit officers
- Mounted patrol officers
- Marine patrol officers
- Patrol supervisors
- Parking enforcement officers

The SPVM also has over 1,000 civilian employees, and around 200 police cadets.

== Ranks ==
Rank Group	Executive Officers		Staff Officers			Superior Officers	Officers	Constables
SPVM
SPVM	Directeur; Director	Directeur-adjoint; Associate Director	Inspecteur-chef; Chief Inspector	Inspecteur; Inspector	Commandant; Commander	Lieutenant; Lieutenant	Sergent; Sergeant	Agent sénior Senior Constable	Agent; Constable

== Operations ==
The SPVM covers an area of about 496 square kilometres and 1,958,000 residents of the island of Montreal.

There are 33 police stations that operate within four geographical regions: East, West, North and South.

Other units of the SPVM include:

- K-9 section
- Mounted unit
- Nautical patrol
- Crisis management
- Strategic planning
- Tactical Intervention Group (GTI)
- Forensics
- Airport Unit at Montréal–Pierre Elliott Trudeau International Airport
- Montréal Metro Unit

=== Fleet ===
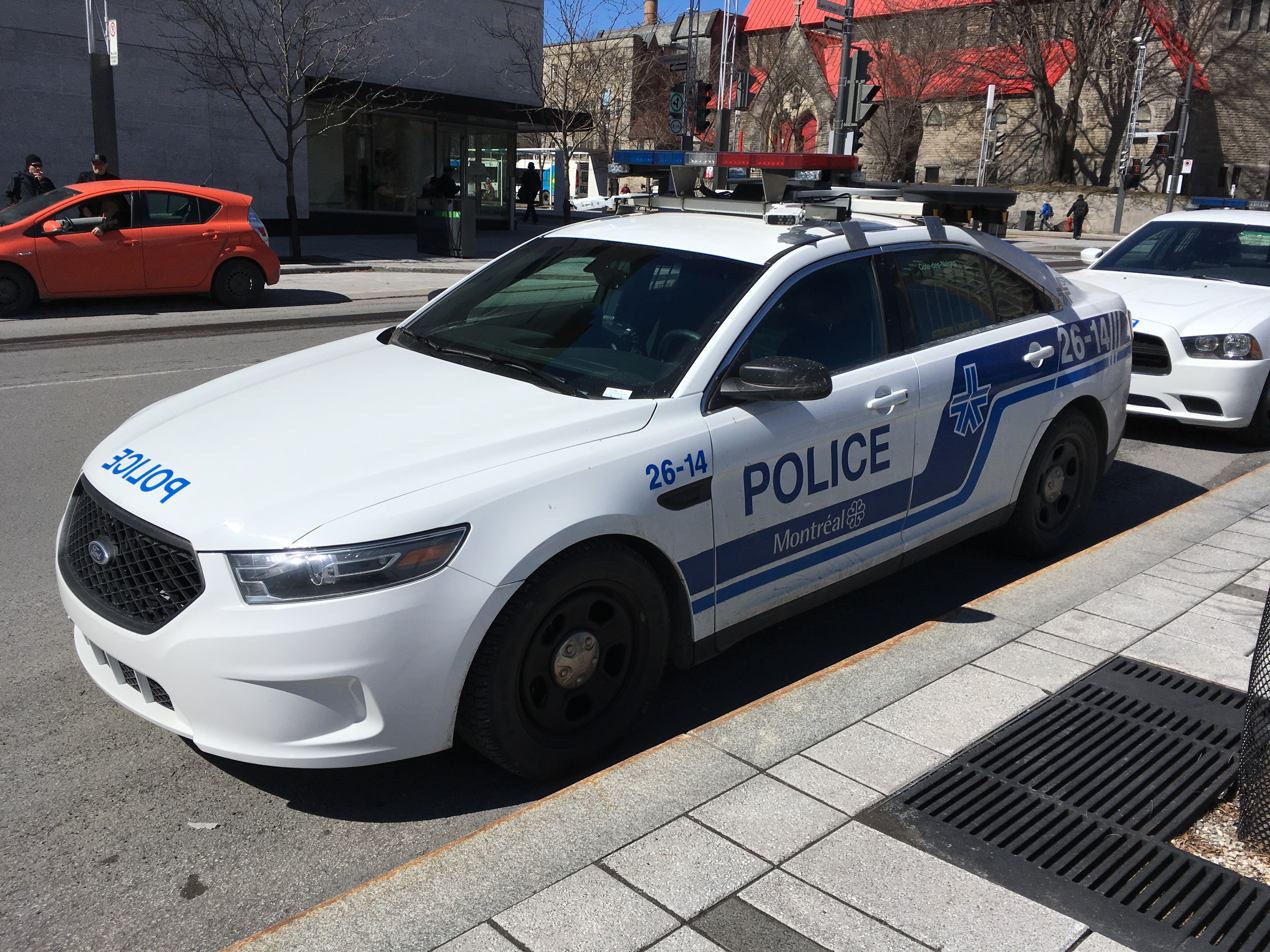
A Ford Taurus vehicle

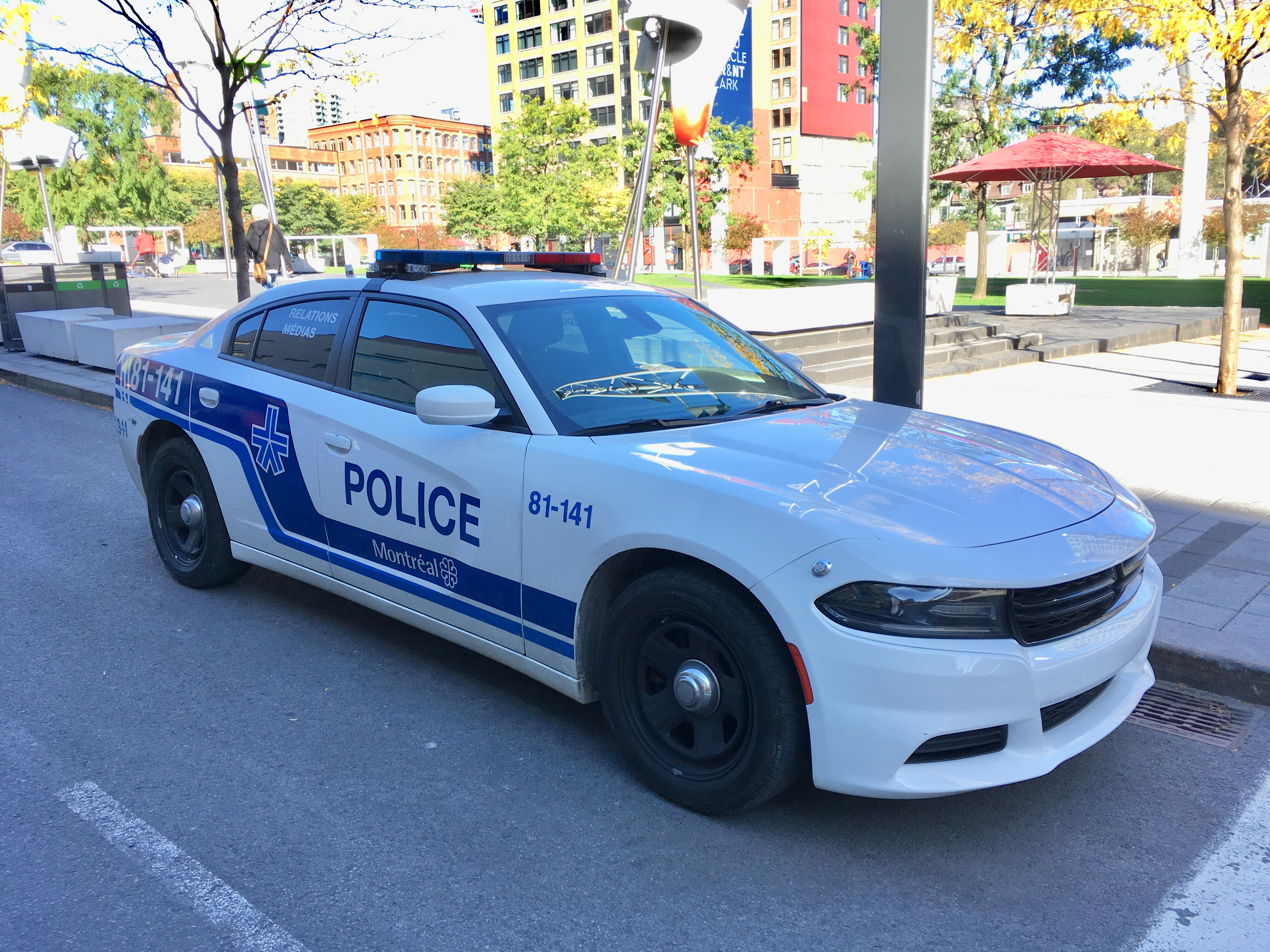
A Dodge Charger vehicle

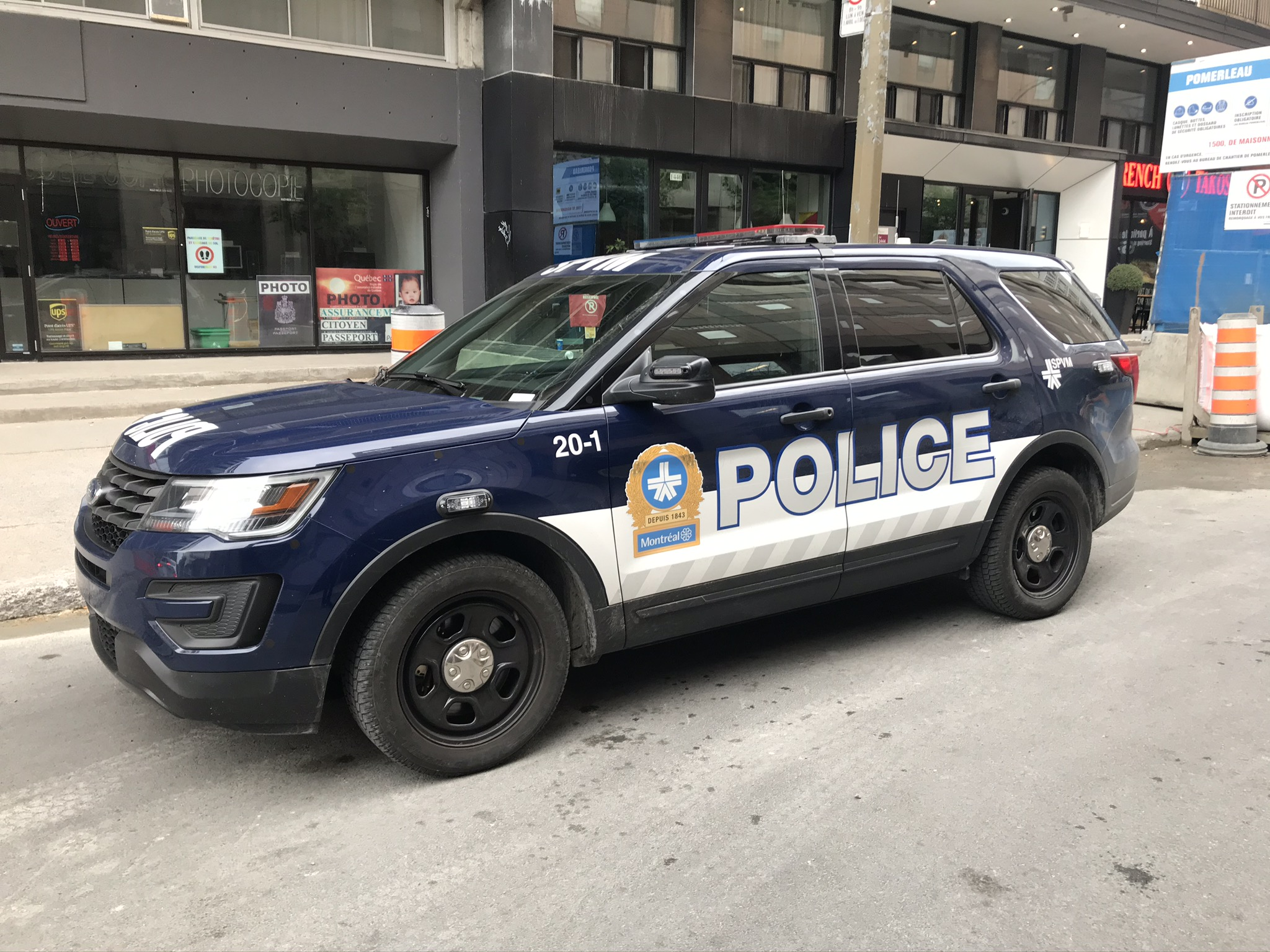
A Ford Police Interceptor Utility vehicle in the new SPVM livery.

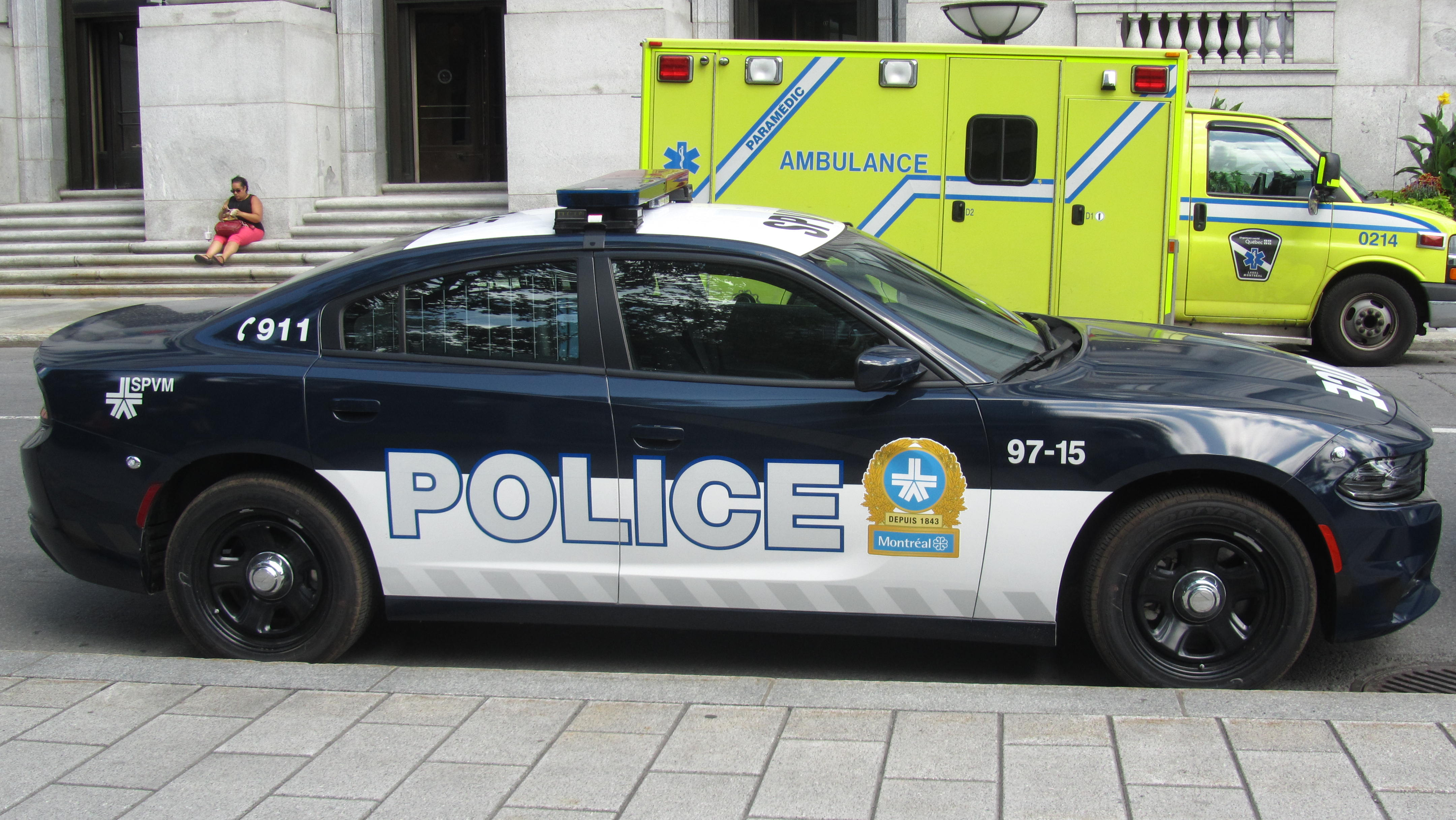
A Dodge Charger in the new SPVM livery.

- Chevrolet Impala 9C1
- Dodge Charger Enforcer
- Ford Police Interceptor Sedan
- Ford Police Interceptor Utility
- Mitsubishi i-MiEV
- BMW R1200RT
- Harley-Davidson Electra-Glide
- Ford E-450
- Ford F-150
- Ford F-450 Super Duty
- Ford Escape
- Ford Transit
- Dodge Grand Caravan
- RAM 2500 Heavy Duty
- RAM 3500 Heavy Duty
- RAM Promaster
- Mercedes-Benz Sprinter
- Grumman Kurbmaster
- Freightliner M2-106
- Thunder-1 (armoured vehicle)
- Winnebago Adventurer

=== Equipment ===
The standard sidearm of the Montreal Police is the Glock 19..Colt Canada C8 and HK416F assault rifle are also stocked by the SPVM and its Tactical Intervention Group armory.

Prior to the Glock 19 officers carried the Walther P99 9mm as the sidearm which replaced the .357 Magnum revolvers in the early 2000s.

== Controversies ==
In November 1987, Anthony Griffin, who was 19 and unarmed, was killed by SPVM police officer Allan Gosset. His death sparked protests.

In 1988, José Carlos Garcia, 43, was killed by an SPVM officer leading to a Sûreté du Québec investigation and a coroner's inquest.

In 1990, Presley Leslie, 26, was killed at Thunderdome dance club by SPVM police leading to an inquiry. That same year, Jorge Chavarria-Reyes was shot by a plainclothes officer leading to a Sûreté du Québec investigation and a coroner's inquest.

In 1991, Fritzgerald Forbes died due to a heart attack following his arrest. Also in 1991, in a case of mistaken identity, 24-year-old Marcellus Francois was killed by Montreal police. A Sûreté du Québec investigation was held and two officers suspended on a short-term basis for misconduct. A lawsuit was launched by the family against the city of Montreal which was settled for $218,269.

In 1993, Trevor Kelley was shot by Montreal police leading to a Sûreté du Québec investigation.

In 1995, Martin Omar Suazo was shot by a Montreal police officer leading to a police ethics commission investigation which found the police officer responsible for improper use of a firearm and led to his short-term suspension.

In 2001, 19-year-old Michael Kibbe fell to his death at a Montreal police station while trying to escape arrest. His parents called for a public inquiry and the case was eventually investigated by the Comité de déontologie policière ('police ethics committee').

In 2004, Rohan Wilson died while in police custody, leading to a coroner's inquest.

In 2005, Mohamed Anas Bennis was shot twice by Montreal police officers leading to the formation of the Justice for Anas Coalition.

On November 3, 2005, the United Nations Human Rights Committee advised the Canadian government to allow an enquiry on the SPVM about its mass arrests tactic during political demonstrations. The tactic is a rapid encirclement of as many protesters as possible regardless of how they may have conducted themselves during the demonstration, and is argued to be a violation of their fundamental rights. According to Francis Dupuis-Déri, a political science professor at Université du Québec à Montréal, police officers employ this tactic because of a "deviance" radical political demonstrators pose to media, politicians and police officers themselves.

In 2007, Quilem Registre died in a hospital four days afted being tasered several times by SPVM officers. Following his death, a coroner's report called for better training of police officers and critiqued their use of the taser.

In 2008, Fredy Villanueva was shot by SPVM Officer Jean-Loup Lapointe, leading to multiple protests and increased public discourse about racial profiling. The SPVM was criticized in the aftermath of the August 10, 2008 riots, which started due to the shooting death of 18-year-old Villanueva by an officer who alleged that Villanueva attacked him and his partner while they were arresting his older brother. He argued that he was trying to defend both his partner and himself by firing his Walther P99 service gun at the 18-year-old.

In 2011, Mario Hamel, a homeless man, was shot by Montreal police officers leading to criticism of SPVM training.

In 2012, Farshad Mohammadi was shot by SPVM officers, resulting in a coroner's report calling for increased training for officers regarding their treatment of those with mental illness as well as criticism of the police's social profiling of homeless individuals.

In 2012, the SPVM came under criticism regarding their handling of the 2012 Quebec student protests.

A former Montreal police officer, Stéfanie Trudeau, also known in the media as "Officer 728", was given a 12-month suspended sentence and ordered to do 60 hours of community service for assaulting a man in October 2012. The officer was found guilty of assault in February 2016 for using excessive force.

In 2014, Alain Magloire, a mentally ill and homeless individual, was killed during a police intervention, leading to a coroner's inquest.

In 2016, 46-year-old Bony Jean-Pierre died following a police intervention in Montreal North, leading to calls for change and a demonstration.

In June 2016, the Quebec Minister of Public Security introduced an independent agency, the Bureau des enquêtes indépendantes (BEI), to be responsible for investigating "shootings, serious injuries and deaths stemming from police interventions". The selection of investigators was criticized for being composed of former members law enforcement. Eleven out of the eighteen members are former police officers, in addition to being "nearly 100 percent white and composed almost entirely of men". The structure of the agency itself was criticized for lacking independent powers, since the BEI "acts only at the request of the Minister of Public Security".

In 2017, 58-year-old Pierre Coriolan died after being shot, tasered, and hit by police officers. A coroner's inquest found that police lacked sufficient de-escalation training.

In 2018, 23-year-old Nicholas Gibbs was shot by a Montreal police officer resulting in protests.

In 2019, a report commissioned by the city found that SPVM officers are four to five times more likely to stop a person of colour than a white person.

In June 2020, the Defund the Police Coalition was formed during international protests in the aftermath of the police murder of George Floyd, the killings of Breonna Taylor and Chantal Moore, and the death of Regis Korchinski-Paquet. The Coalition consists of over 80 groups. One of the Coalition's demands is to reduce the SPVM budget by at least 50%.

In January 2021, the SPVM evoked controversy when they mistakenly arrested a Polytechnique Montréal professor in the Park Extension neighbourhood. The man spent six days in jail, before being cleared on charges of disarming and assaulting a police officer, while the actual suspect remains at large. This led to renewed calls for universal police body cameras.

On June 12, 2026, 10 days before the 2026 Montreal shooting in which a SPVM officer died on duty, 16 SPVM officers working for Montréal-Nord's local police station 39 were suspended or sanctioned over racist allegations targeting Black and Arab people in police stops, Chief Police Fady Dagher said on a late-night Friday-evening conference. Radio-Canada sources say some officers, who were denounced by their fellow colleagues, allegedly kept dreadlocks from suspects as trophies, and also gave citations based solely on some citizens' ethnic backgrounds .

== See also ==
- Integrated Security Unit
- Police officer
- Royal Canadian Mounted Police
- Service de sécurité incendie de Montréal
- Sûreté du Québec
- Urgences-Santé

== Books ==
- Cedilot, Andre; Noel, Andre (2012). Mafia Inc. The Long, Bloody Reign of Canada's Sicilian Clan. Toronto: Random House of Canada. ISBN 9780307360410.
