= Killing of Anthony Griffin =

1987 killing

- Date: November 17, 1987; 38 years ago
- Location: Montreal, Quebec, Canada

On November 17, 1987, unarmed 19-year old Black Canadian Anthony Griffin was shot and killed by Constable Allan Gosset of the Service de police de la Ville de Montréal (SPVM) outside of a police station in the Notre-Dame-de-Grâce neighbourhood of Montreal, Quebec, Canada. The killing led to months of community protests. On February 28, 1988, approximately 1,000 protesters marched in NDG demanding justice. Gosset was twice tried for manslaughter but was never convicted. He also denied allegations of racism, instead blaming an accidental firing of his weapon. The killing was frequently referenced in the decades afterwards.

== See also ==
- Death of Abisay Cruz, a Montreal resident shot and killed in 2025 by the SPVM
