= Bradburn =

Bradburn may refer to:

- Bradburn, Colorado
- Bradburn, Manitoba
- Bradburn (surname)
