= Calgary Police Service =

Municipal police service of Calgary, Canada

- Motto: Onward (same as the City of Calgary)

Agency overview
- Formed: 1885
- Employees: 3,006 (2022)
- Annual budget: approximately 500 million dollars

Jurisdictional structure
- Operations jurisdiction: City of Calgary, Alberta, Canada
- Area: 820.62 sq km
- Population: 1 306 784
- Governing body: Calgary Police Commission
- Constituting instrument: Police Act
- General nature: Local civilian police

Operational structure
- Headquarters: 5111 47th Street NE; Calgary, Canada 51.09854614223833°N 113.97063992015676°W
- Sworn members: 2,134 (2022)
- Non-sworn members: 874 (2022)
- Elected officer responsible: The Honorable Mickey Amery, Minister of Justice and Solicitor General
- Agency executives: Katie McLellan, Chief Constable; Cliff O’Brien, Deputy Chief; Asif Rashid, Deputy Chief; Cory Dayley, Deputy Chief; Kim Armstrong, Chief People Officer; Katherine Murphy, Chief Strategy Officer

Facilities
- Stations: 8 (excluding headquarters)

Notables
- Programme: Helicopter Air Watch for Community Safety

Website
- www.calgary.ca/cps.html

Calgary Police Service (CPS) is the municipal police service of the City of Calgary, Alberta, Canada. It is the largest municipal police service in Alberta and third largest municipal force in Canada behind the Toronto Police Service and the Montreal City Police Service.

== History ==
The Calgary Police Service was founded on February 7, 1885, and initially consisted of two constables led by Chief Jack Ingram.

On October 8, 1993, Constable Rick Sonnenberg was preparing a spike strip to stop a stolen vehicle when he was struck by the fleeing motorist and killed. In the wake of his death and fundraising from the Sonnenberg family, the force acquired a helicopter and formed the Helicopter Air Watch for Community Safety (HAWCS) unit in 1995. In 2003, a second helicopter was purchased, expanding the unit.

In 1995, the Calgary Police Commission appointed Christine Silverberg as chief of police, making her the first woman to lead a large police force in Canada. (Note: Lenna Bradburn led the smaller Guelph Police Service from 1994 until 2000.) Silverberg served as chief until 2000, when she retired from the police service.

In the early 2010s, in response to regional applicant shortages, the Calgary Police Service briefly accepted applications from international police officers who were not already landed immigrants, permanent residents, or citizens of Canada. The force had ended the program by 2017.

On 19 May 2019, CPS has considered relaunching its auxiliary cadet program, which was launched in 2013 and disbanded in April 2019 due to union concerns on staffing and safety.

In 2019, CPS equipped all of its frontline officers with police body cameras, becoming the first major police force in Canada to do so.

On New Year's Eve, 2020, Sergeant Andrew Harnett, who had been employed by the Calgary Police Service for 12 years, stopped a car after noticing the vehicle's licence plate did not match its registration. As Harnett and two other officers who had responded to the traffic stop prepared to arrest the vehicle's passenger on an outstanding warrant, the driver fled the scene with Harnett holding onto the driver's side door. Harnett was dragged 427 metres (1,401 ft) before falling off of the vehicle and being struck by oncoming traffic. Despite efforts in saving Harnett, he died just over an hour later.

=== Line of duty deaths ===
Since its formation in 1885, twelve Calgary Police officers have been killed in the line of duty.

- 1917 – Constable Arthur Duncan (gunfire)
- 1933 – Inspector Joe Carruthers (gunfire)
- 1941 – Constable Wilf Cox (motorcycle collision)
- 1957 – Constable Ken Delmage (motorcycle collision)
- 1974 – Detective Boyd Davidson (gunfire)
- 1976 – Staff Sgt. Keith Harrison (gunfire)
- 1977 – Constable Bill Shelever (gunfire)
- 1992 – Constable Rob Vanderwiel (gunfire)
- 1993 – Constable Rick Sonnenberg (hit while attempting to stop stolen vehicle)
- 2000 – Constable John Petropoulos (injuries sustained in fall)
- 2001 – Constable Darren Beatty (injuries sustained during training exercise)
- 2020 - Sergeant Andrew Harnett (succumbed to injuries dealt to him while performing traffic stop)

== Organization ==
=== Rank structure ===
Rank	Chief Constable	Deputy Chief	Superintendent	Inspector	Regimental Sergeant Major	Staff Sergeant	Sergeant / Detective	Senior Constable level 2	Senior Constable level 1	Constable (classes 1 to 5, sworn officer)	Auxiliary (un-sworn-officer)
Insignia	c									No insignia	No insignia
Insignia	Slip-on	Slip-on	Slip-on	Slip-on	Arm patch	Arm patch	Arm patch	Arm patch	Arm patch	No insignia	No insignia

=== Divisions ===
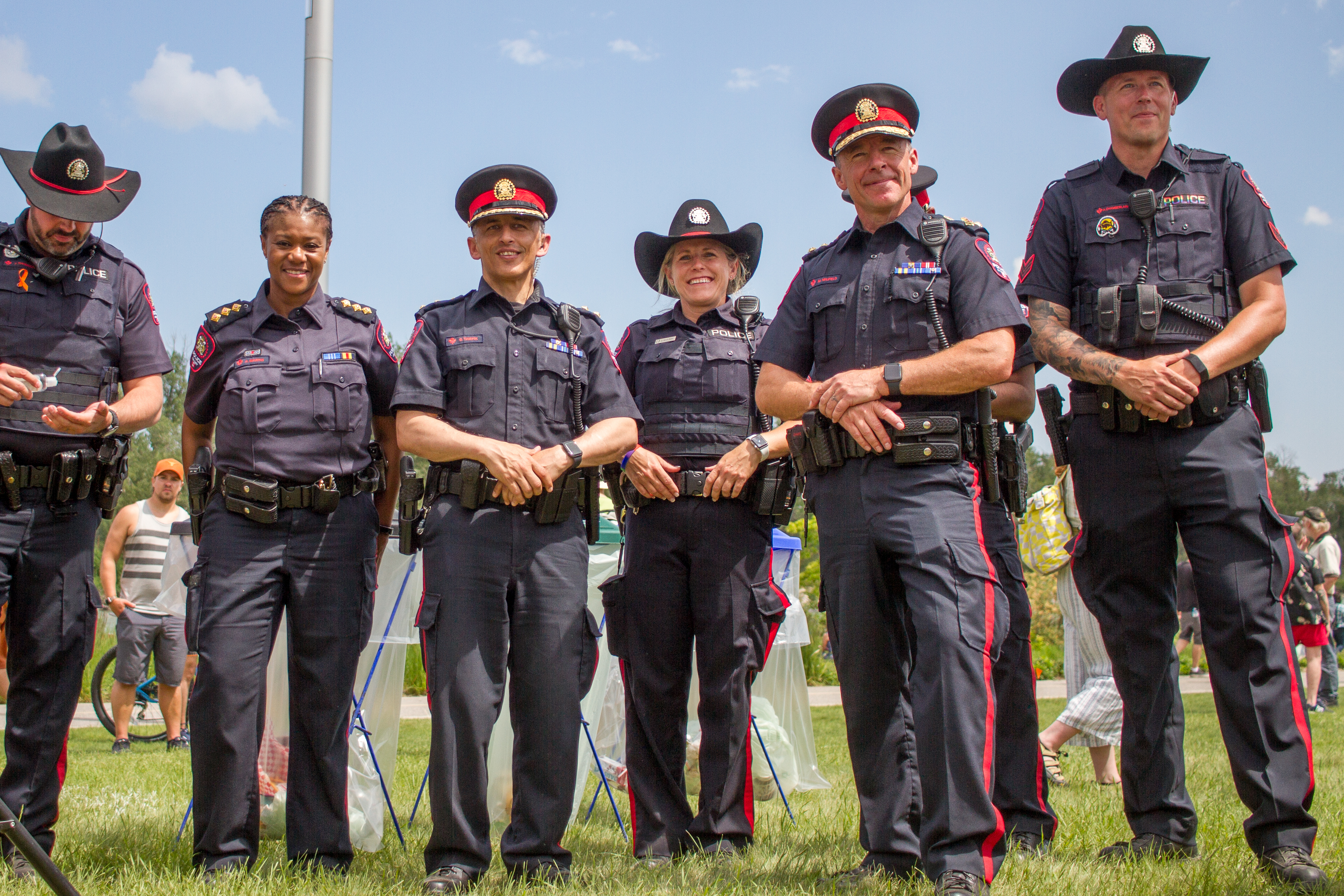
Members of Calgary Police Service, including former chief Mark Neufeld, at Canada Day festivities in Calgary

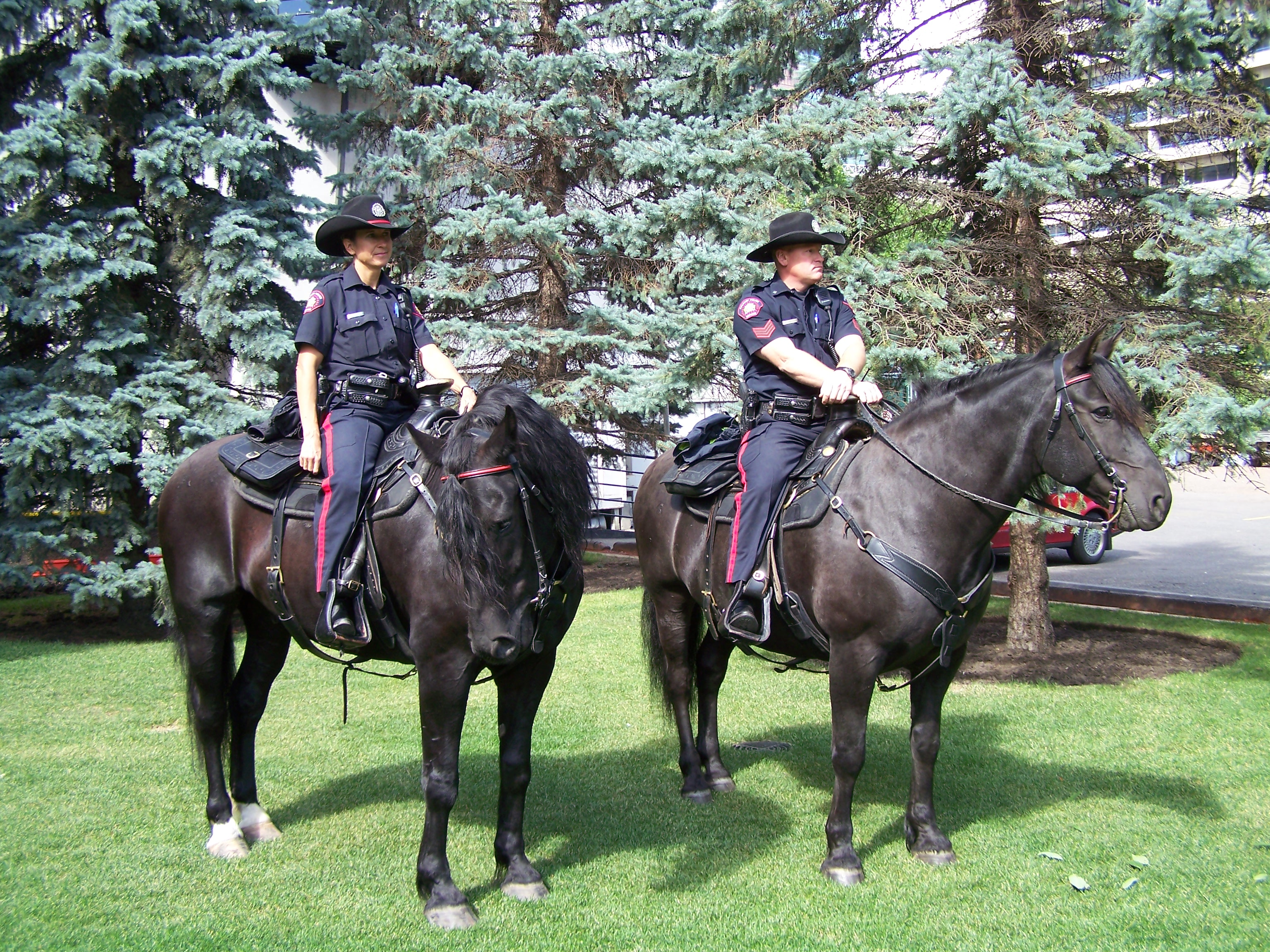
Members of mounted unit at Olympic Plaza

CPS is divided into the following sections:

- Administration
- Chief Crowfoot Learning Centre
- Community and youth services
- Community liaison
- Criminal operations
- Finance
- Fleet and facilities
- Human resources
- Information communication technology section
- Investigation support
- Major crimes
- Operations audit
- Organized crime control
- Professional standards
- Real time operations centre (RTOC)
- Support
- Traffic services

== Equipment ==
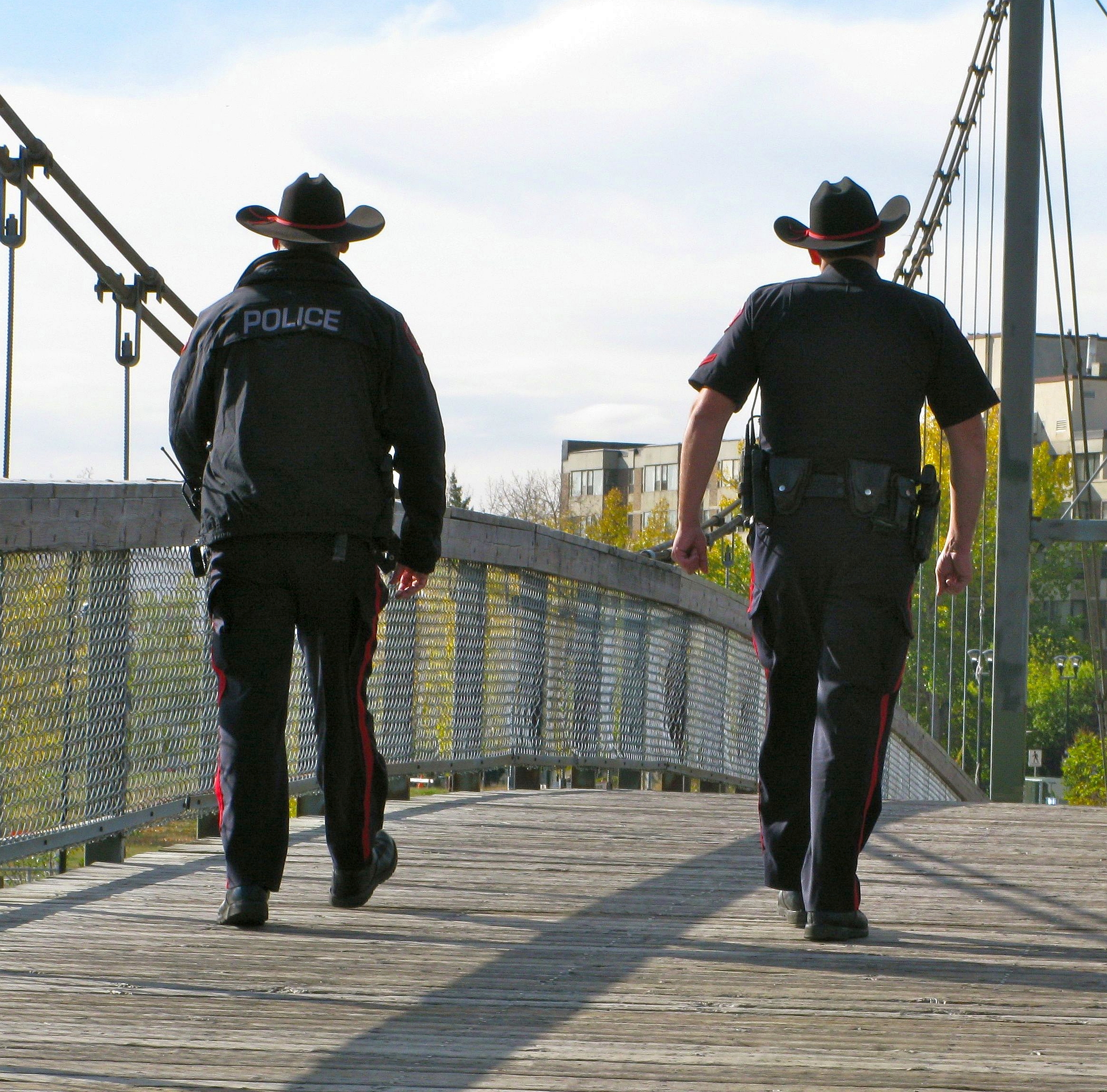
CPS officers on foot patrol

=== Vehicles ===
Most vehicles used by the Calgary Police Service are imported from the United States and use the black and white colour scheme common of police vehicles in the United States, due to the increased recognition of this color scheme as used by police.

Vehicles currently in use include:

- Ford Police Interceptor Sedan
- Ford Police Interceptor Utility
- Ford F-150
- Ford Transit
- Chevrolet Tahoe
- Chevrolet Express (Tactical unit & Marked Transport/Utility van)
- Ford Super Duty (Tactical unit only)
- Cambli Thunder 2 (Tatical unit only)
- Armet Balkan MK7 (Tactical unit only)
- Freightliner M2 106 Mobile Communications Unit
- Suzuki V-Strom 1000
- Harley-Davidson FLHTP
- Airbus H125 – HAWCS (Helicopter Air Watch for Community Safety) units HAWC1 and HAWC2
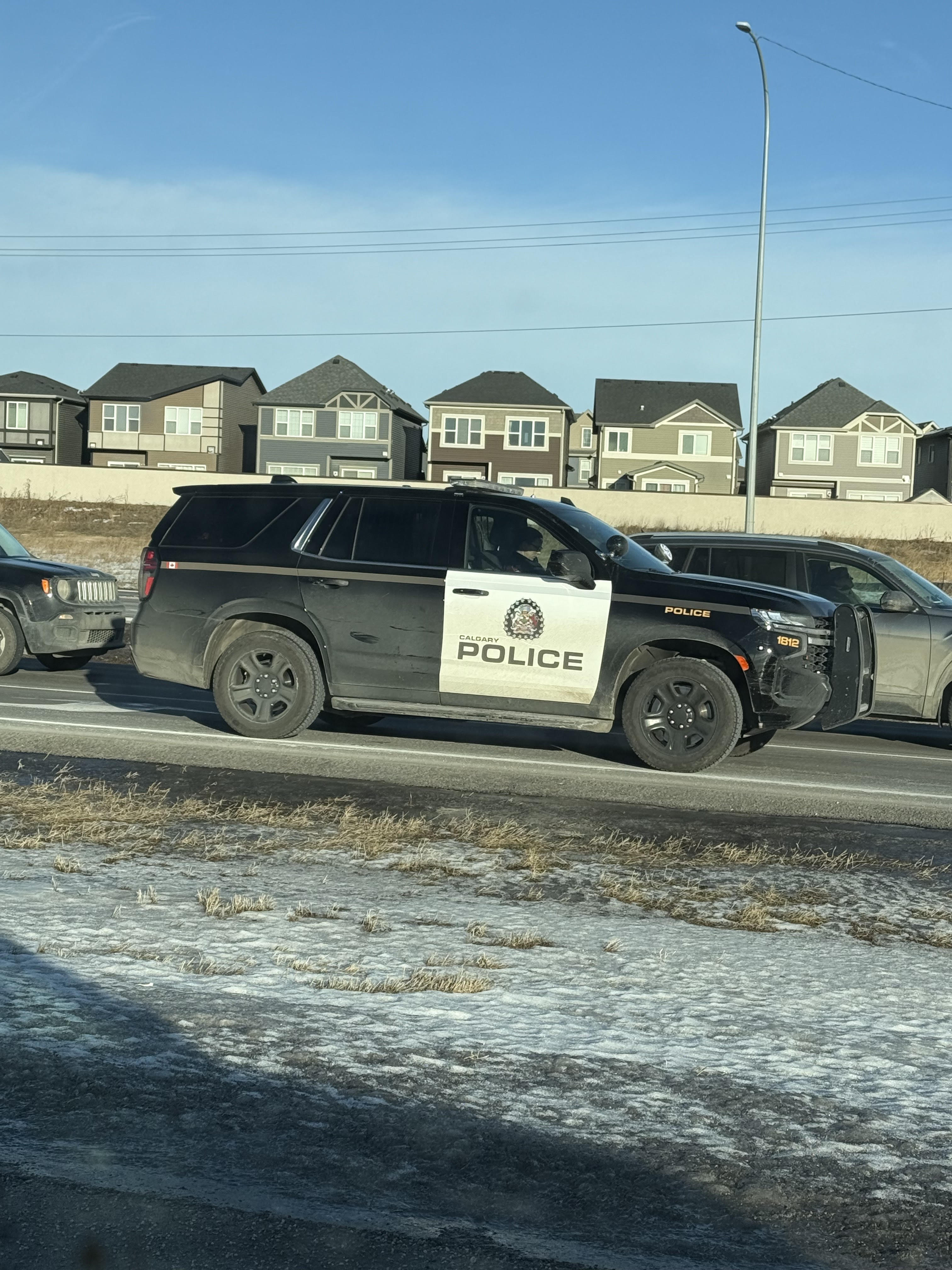
2023 Tahoe 9C1 PPV

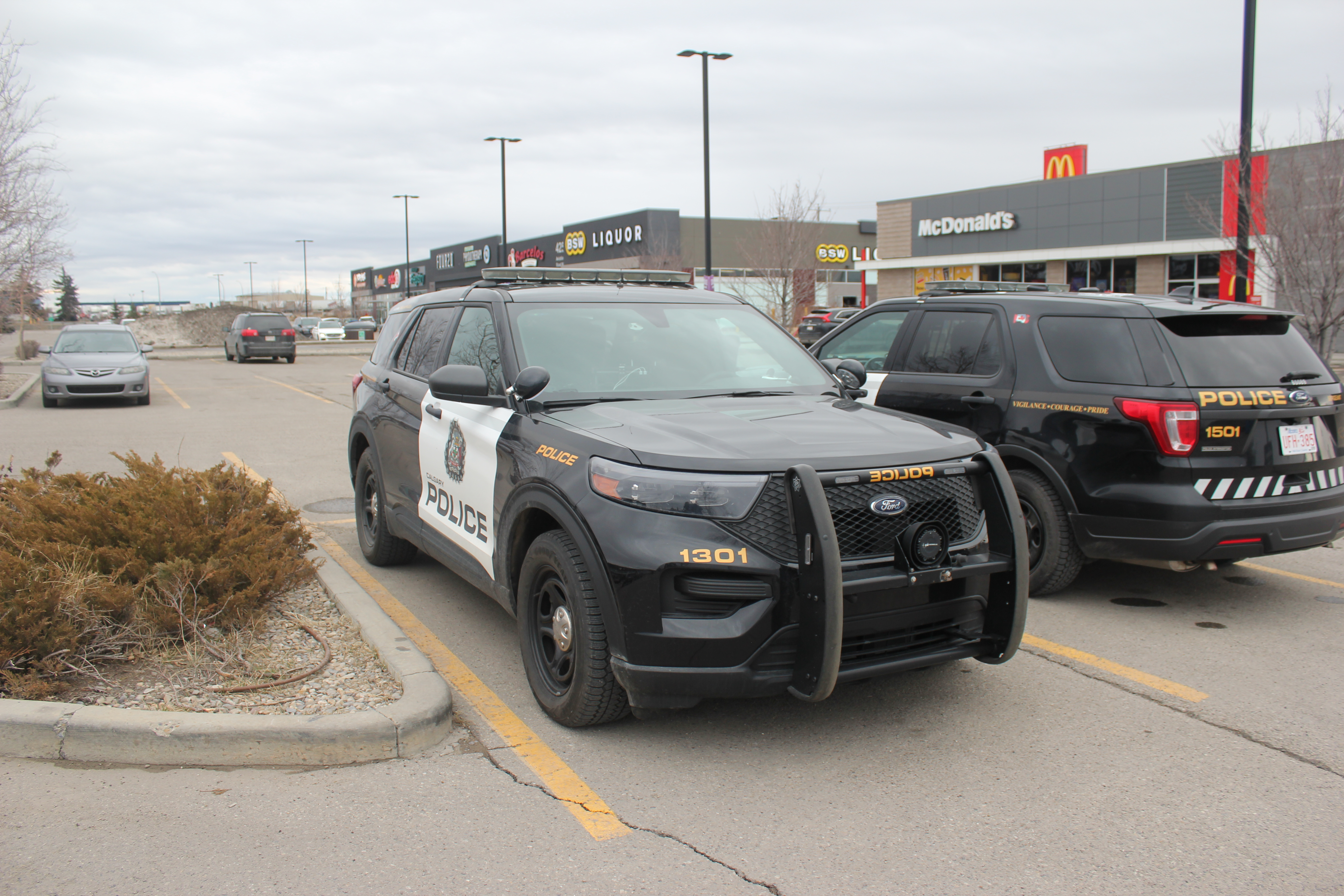
2020 Ford Police Interceptor Utility

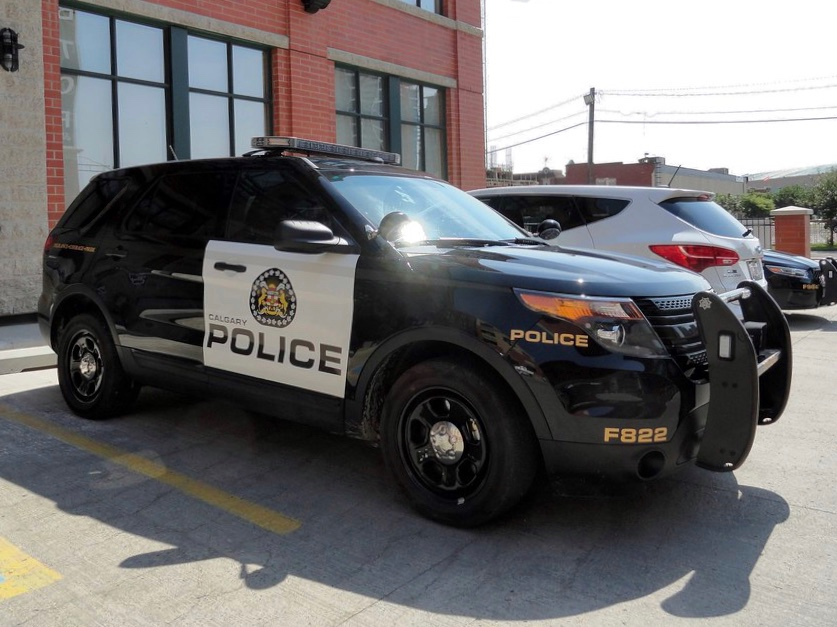
CPS Ford police interceptor utility

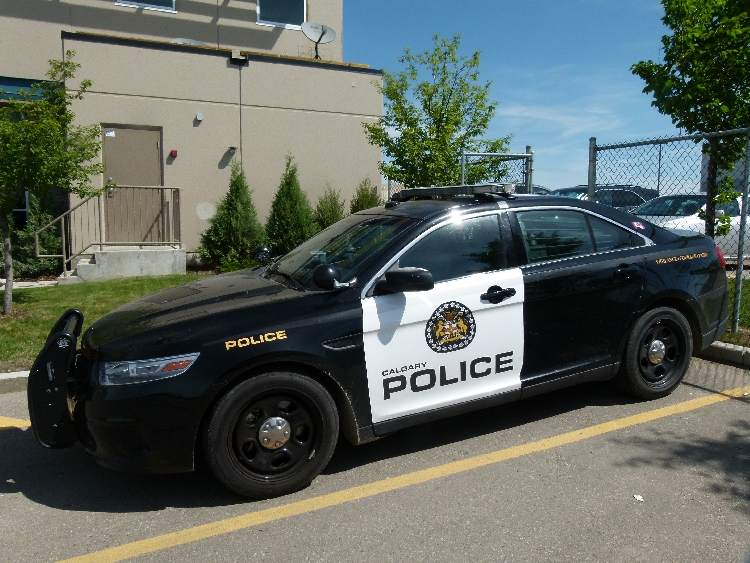
CPS Ford police interceptor sedan

== See also ==
- Alberta Law Enforcement Response Teams
- Integrated Security Unit
- Law enforcement in Canada
