= Steve Tanner =

Steve Tanner may refer to:

- Steve Tanner (politician), American politician from Idaho
- Steve Tanner (referee) (born 1970), British football referee
- Steve Tanner (Coronation Street), a former character in British soap Coronation Street

== See also ==
- Stephen Tanner, American author
- Stephen J. Tanner, Canadian police chief
