= Stephen J. Tanner =

Canadian policeman

Stephen J. Tanner OOM
- Born: Oakville, Ontario
- Education: University of Guelph, University of Western Ontario
- Relatives: Carla, 2 sons
- Police career
- Allegiance: Canada
- Department: Chief of Police of Halton Regional Police (2012-Present); Chief of Police of Kingston Police Force (2008-2012); Chief of Police of Belleville Police Service (2002-2008)
- Service years: 40
- Status: Active
- Rank: Chief of Police
- Awards: Officer, Order of Merit of the Police Forces; Queen Elizabeth II Diamond Jubilee Medal; Police Exemplary Service Medal with bar

Stephen J. Tanner, OOM is the Chief of Police of the Halton Regional Police Service in Ontario, Canada. He began his term on September 1, 2012, and was sworn in on September 4, 2012, succeeding retired Chief of Police Gary Crowell. Tanner is currently the longest-serving active police chief in Canada, having served in that role for 20 years.

Tanner commenced his policing career on September 13, 1982 with the Halton Regional Police Service. Tanner worked in a variety of areas including uniform patrol, criminal investigations, tactical rescue, training, intelligence, polygraph and major crime. In 1998, he was appointed as Deputy Chief of Operations with the Guelph Police Service where he served until relocating to Belleville Police Service as Deputy Chief in 2000. In 2002, Tanner was appointed as Belleville's Chief of Police. In 2008, Tanner was appointed as Chief of Police of the Kingston Police Force where he served until 2012.

Tanner currently serves as chair of the Criminal Intelligence Service of Ontario and is Co-chair of the National Police Services National Advisory Committee (NPS NAC) which oversees a variety of policing functions for Canada.

In January 2012, Tanner was appointed by the Governor General of Canada as an Officer of the Order of Merit of the Police Forces.

== Education ==
Tanner graduated from the University of Guelph in 1982, with a psychology degree and graduated from University of Western Ontario with a master of public administration.

Police appointments
Preceded by Gary Crowell	Chief of Police of the Halton Regional Police Service; 2012 – Present	Succeeded by Incumbent

Police appointments
Preceded by William J. Closs	Chief of Police of the Kingston Police Force; 2008 – 2012	Succeeded by Gilles M. Larochelle

Police appointments
Preceded by David Klenavic	Chief of Police of the Belleville Police Service; 2002 – 2008	Succeeded by Cory McMullan
