= Bradburn (surname) =

Bradburn is a surname. It is the surname of:

- Angela Bradburn (born 1968), American high jumper
- George Bradburn (1806–1880), American abolitionist politician and Unitarian minister
- George Bradburn (1894–1975), English footballer
- Grant Bradburn (born 1966), New Zealand cricketer
- Juan Davis Bradburn (1787–1842), US-born brigadier general in the Mexican Army
- Lenna Bradburn (born 1960), Canada's first female police chief
- Mary Bradburn (1918–2000), British mathematics educator
- Norman Bradburn (born 1933), American social scientist and academic administrator
- Samuel Bradburn (1751–1816), Gibraltar-born English Methodist preacher
- Thomas Evans Bradburn (1853–1933), business owner and politician in Ontario, Canada
- William Herbert Bradburn, Canadian politician
- Wynne Bradburn (1938–2008), New Zealand cricketer
