= Fall of Saigon =

End of the Vietnam War, 30 April 1975

- Part of the 1975 spring offensive of the Vietnam War
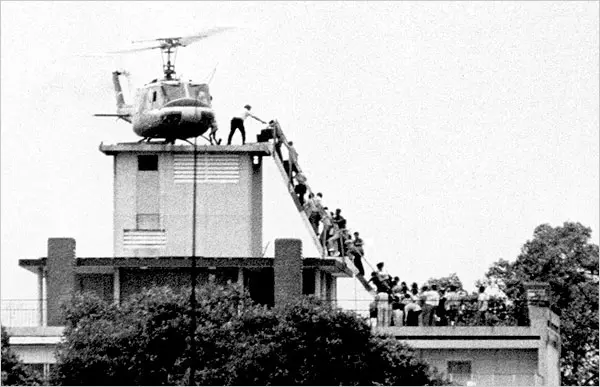
- A CIA officer helps evacuees up a ladder onto an Air America Bell 204/205 helicopter at 22 Gia Long Street on 29 April 1975
Date	30 April 1975; 51 years ago
Location	Saigon, South Vietnam 10°46′41″N 106°41′46″E
Result	North Vietnamese victory

Belligerents
North Vietnam; (Provisional Revolutionary Government of the Republic of South Vietnam) Viet Cong	South Vietnam

Commanders and leaders
Lê Duẩn; Võ Nguyên Giáp; Văn Tiến Dũng; Trần Văn Trà; Lê Đức Anh; Nguyễn Hữu An; Lê Trọng Tấn	Dương Văn Minh (surrendered); Nguyễn Văn Huyền; Vũ Văn Mẫu; Nguyễn Văn Toàn; Trần Văn Minh; Nguyễn Văn Minh; Phạm Văn Phú †

Strength
270,000 regulars 180,000 irregulars and guerrillas	60,000 regulars 60,000 RF/PF militia 5,000 police

Casualties and losses
At least 108 killed; At least 8 tanks and 1 armored vehicle destroyed or damaged	Most of the troops were killed, captured, deserted or surrendered; Dozens of tanks, armored vehicles and aircraft were destroyed or captured

Saigon, the capital of South Vietnam, was captured by North Vietnam on 30 April 1975. This caused the evacuation of thousands of civilians and U.S. personnel, and ended the Vietnam War. The aftermath ushered in a transition period under the Provisional Revolutionary Government of the Republic of South Vietnam until the formal reunification in 1976.

As part of the 1975 spring offensive, the People's Army of Vietnam (PAVN) and the Viet Cong (VC) auxiliaries, under the command of General Văn Tiến Dũng, began their final attack on Saigon on 29 April 1975, with the Army of the Republic of Vietnam (ARVN) commanded by General Nguyễn Văn Toàn suffering a heavy artillery bombardment. By the next day, President Minh had surrendered while the PAVN/VC had occupied the important points of the city and raised the VC flag over the South Vietnamese Presidential Palace, ending the existence of South Vietnam and its predecessor (1949–1975). For the first time since 1954, Vietnam was unified under a single regime.

The capture of the city was preceded by Operation Frequent Wind, the evacuation of almost all American civilian and military personnel in Saigon, along with tens of thousands of South Vietnamese civilians who had been associated with the government. A small number of Americans chose not to be evacuated. United States ground combat units had left South Vietnam more than two years before the fall of Saigon and were not available to assist with either the defense or the evacuation of Saigon. The evacuation was the largest helicopter evacuation in history. In addition to the flight of refugees, the institution of new rules by the communist government contributed to a decline in the city's population until 1979.

On 2 July 1976, the reunification was formalized and the Socialist Republic of Vietnam was established with the capital in Hanoi. The same day, the Vietnamese National Assembly renamed Saigon Ho Chi Minh City after Ho Chi Minh, the North Vietnamese president who died in 1969.

== Names ==
Various names have been applied to these events. The government of Vietnam officially calls it the "Day of the Liberation of the South and National Reunification" (Vietnamese: Ngày giải phóng miền Nam, thống nhất đất nước), "Liberation Day" (Ngày giải phóng), or "Victory Day" (Ngày Chiến thắng), while the term "fall of Saigon" is commonly used in Western accounts. It is alternatively called the "Day the Country Was Lost" (Ngày vong quốc), "Black April" (Tháng Tư Đen), "National Day of Shame" (Ngày Quốc hận) by many overseas Vietnamese who were refugees from the former South Vietnam. It is also known by the neutral names "April 30, 1975 incident" (Sự kiện 30 tháng 4 năm 1975) or simply "April 30" (30 tháng 4). Previously, the designation Ngày Quốc hận was associated with 20 July, in reference to the signing of the 1954 Geneva Accords by the French and the Viet Minh, which led to the partition of Vietnam and set the stage for the Vietnam War.

== North Vietnamese advance ==
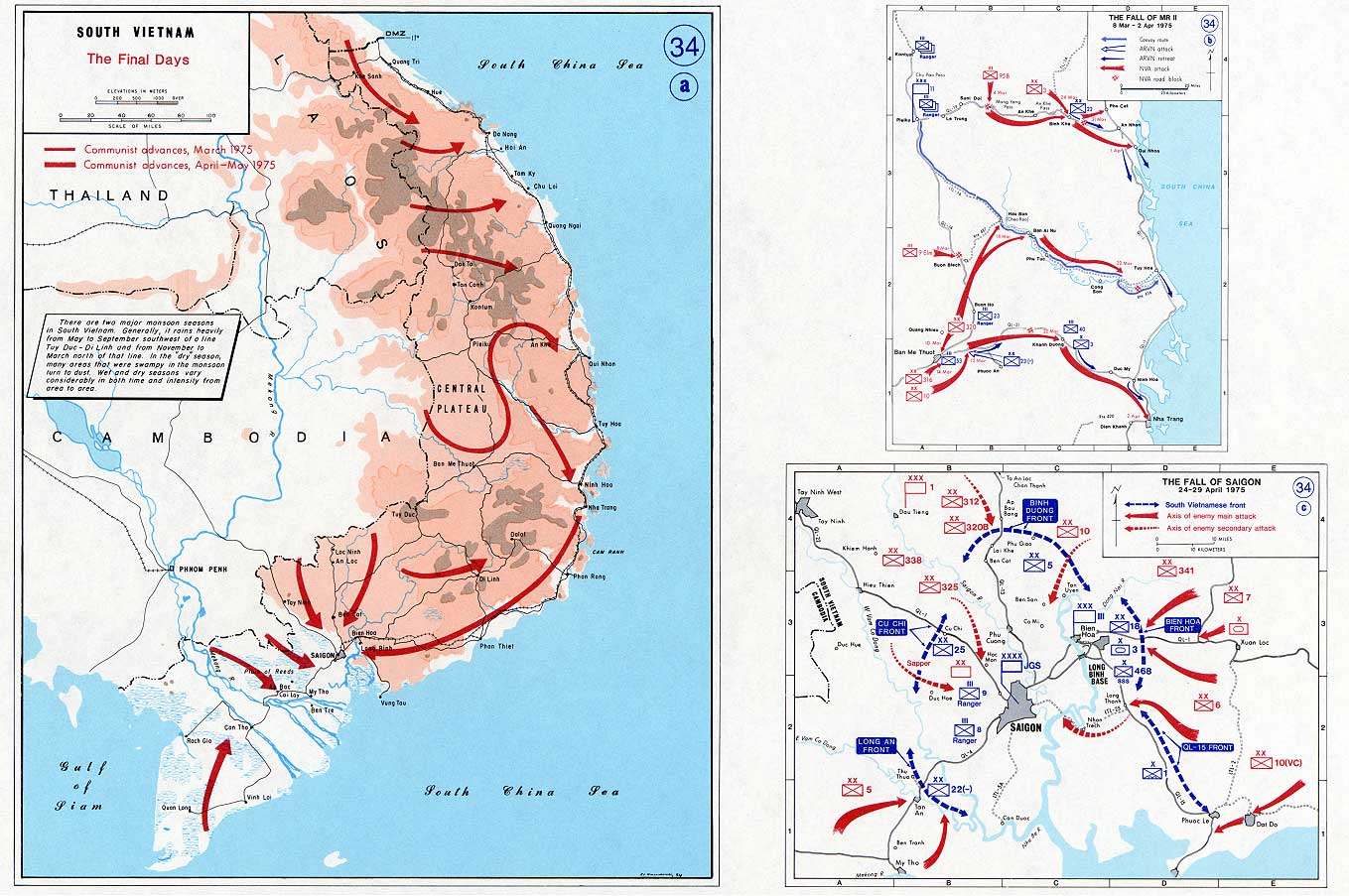
Situation of South Vietnam before the capture of Saigon (lower right) on 30 April 1975

The 1973 Paris Peace Accords called for political reconciliation in South Vietnam and peaceful reunification to end the Vietnam War, a Cold War conflict. In reality, the Accords could not be fully implemented due to violations by both the PAVN/VC and the ARVN immediately. North Vietnam initially intended to take over the South by force in 1976 amid sharp cuts in US aid to South Vietnam and the loss of the possibility of renewed US military intervention after the Battle of Phước Long. The rapidity with which the South Vietnamese position collapsed in 1975 was surprising to most American and South Vietnamese observers, and probably to the North Vietnamese and their allies as well. A memo prepared by the Central Intelligence Agency (CIA) and U.S. Army Intelligence, published on 5 March, indicated that South Vietnam could hold out through the current dry season—i.e., at least until 1976. These predictions proved to be grievously in error. Even as that memo was being released, Dũng was preparing a major offensive in the Central Highlands of Vietnam, which began on 10 March and led to the capture of Buôn Ma Thuột. The ARVN began a disorderly and costly retreat, hoping to redeploy its forces and hold the southern part of South Vietnam, south of the 13th parallel. The collapse of the ARVN in the Central Highlands caused North Vietnam to accelerate its military plan.

Supported by artillery and armor, the PAVN continued to march towards Saigon, capturing the major cities of northern South Vietnam at the end of March—Huế on the 25th and Đà Nẵng on the 28th. Along the way, disorderly South Vietnamese retreats and the flight of refugees—there were more than 300,000 in Đà Nẵng—damaged South Vietnamese prospects for a turnaround. After the loss of Đà Nẵng, those prospects had already been dismissed as nonexistent by CIA officers in Vietnam, who believed that nothing short of B-52 strikes against Hanoi could possibly stop the North Vietnamese.

By 8 April, the North Vietnamese Politburo, which in March had recommended caution to Dũng, cabled him to demand "unremitting vigor in the attack all the way to the heart of Saigon." On 14 April, they renamed the campaign the "Hồ Chí Minh campaign", after revolutionary leader Hồ Chí Minh, in hopes of wrapping it up before his birthday on 19 May. Meanwhile, South Vietnam failed to garner any significant increase in military aid from the United States, snuffing out President Nguyễn Văn Thiệu's hopes for renewed American support.

On 9 April, PAVN forces reached Xuân Lộc, the last line of defense before Saigon, where the ARVN 18th Division made a last stand and held the city through fierce fighting for 11 days. The ARVN finally withdrew from Xuân Lộc on 20 April having inflicted heavy losses on the PAVN, and President Thiệu resigned on 21 April in a tearful televised announcement in which he denounced the United States for failing to come to the aid of the South. The North Vietnamese front line was now just 26 mi (42 km) from downtown Saigon. The victory at Xuân Lộc, which had drawn many South Vietnamese troops away from the Mekong Delta area, opened the way for the PAVN to completely encircle Saigon with their five Army Corps: Group 232, 3rd Corps, 1st Corps, 4th Corps, and 2nd Corps (deployed clockwise around Saigon), totaling 15 infantry divisions plus several independent regiments and three tank regiments.

The ARVN III Corps commander, General Nguyễn Văn Toàn, had organized five centers of resistance to defend the city. These fronts were so connected as to form an arc enveloping the entire area west, north, and east of the capital. The Củ Chi front, to the northwest, was defended by the 25th Division; the Bình Dương front, to the north, was the responsibility of the 5th Division; the Biên Hòa front, to the northeast, was defended by the 18th Division; the Phước Tuy and Route 15 front, to the southeast, were held by the 1st Airborne Brigade and one battalion of the 3rd Division; and the Long An and Route 4 front, for which the Capital Military District (CMD) Command was responsible, was defended by elements of the re-formed 22nd Division and under-strength 6th Ranger Group. South Vietnamese defensive forces around Saigon totaled approximately 125,000 troops, including 60,000 Regular troops, 40,000 RF plus 20,000 PF militia, and 5,000 police. However, as the exodus made it into Saigon, along with them were many ARVN soldiers, which swelled the "men under arms" in the city to over 250,000. These units were mostly battered and leaderless, which threw the city into further anarchy.

== Evacuation ==
The rapid PAVN advances of March and early April led to increased concern in Saigon that the city, which had been fairly peaceful throughout the war and whose people had endured relatively little suffering, was soon to come under direct attack. Many feared that once the communists took control of the city, a bloodbath of reprisals would take place. In 1968, PAVN and VC forces had occupied Huế for close to a month. After they were ejected, American and ARVN forces had found mass graves. A study indicated that the VC had targeted ARVN officers, Catholics, intellectuals, businessmen, and other suspected counterrevolutionaries. More recently, eight Americans captured in Buôn Ma Thuột had vanished and reports of beheadings and other executions were filtering through from Huế and Đà Nẵng, mostly spurred on by government propaganda. Most Americans and citizens of other countries allied to the United States wanted to evacuate the city before it fell, and many South Vietnamese, especially those associated with the United States or South Vietnamese government, wanted to leave as well.

As early as the end of March, some Americans were leaving the city. Flights out of Saigon, lightly booked under ordinary circumstances, were full. Throughout April the speed of the evacuation increased, as the Defense Attaché Office (DAO) began to fly out nonessential personnel. Many Americans attached to the DAO refused to leave without their Vietnamese friends and dependents, who included common-law wives and children. It was illegal for the DAO to move these people to American soil, and this initially slowed down the rate of departure, but eventually the DAO began illegally flying undocumented Vietnamese to Clark Air Base in the Philippines.

On 3 April, President Gerald Ford announced "Operation Babylift", which would evacuate about 2,000 orphans from the country. One of the Lockheed C-5 Galaxy planes involved in the operation crashed, killing 155 passengers and crew and seriously reducing the morale of the American staff. In addition to the over 2,500 orphans evacuated by Babylift, Operation New Life resulted in the evacuation of over 110,000 Vietnamese refugees. The final evacuation was Operation Frequent Wind which resulted in 7,000 people being evacuated from Saigon by helicopter.

=== Ford administration's plans for the final evacuation ===
By this time, the Ford administration had also begun planning a complete evacuation of the American presence. The planning was complicated by practical, legal, and strategic concerns. The administration was divided on how swift the evacuations should be. The Pentagon sought to evacuate as fast as possible, to avoid the risk of casualties or other accidents. The U.S. Ambassador to South Vietnam, Graham Martin, was technically the field commander for any evacuation since evacuations are part of the purview of the State Department. Martin drew the ire of many in the Pentagon by wishing to keep the evacuation process as quiet and orderly as possible. His desire for this was to prevent total chaos and to deflect the real possibility of South Vietnamese turning against Americans and to keep all-out bloodshed from occurring.

Ford approved a plan between the extremes in which all but 1,250 Americans—few enough to be removed in a single day's helicopter airlift—would be evacuated quickly; the remaining 1,250 would only leave when the airport was threatened. In the meantime, as many Vietnamese refugees as possible would be flown out.

American evacuation planning was set against the Ford administration's other policies. Ford still hoped that he would be able to gain additional military aid for South Vietnam. Throughout April, he attempted to get Congress behind a proposed appropriation of $722 million, which might cover the cost of the reconstitution of some of the South Vietnamese forces that had been destroyed. National Security Advisor Henry Kissinger was opposed to a full-scale evacuation as long as the aid option remained on the table because the removal of American forces would signal a loss of faith in Thiệu and severely weaken him.

There was also a concern in the administration over whether the use of military forces to support and carry out the evacuation was permitted under the newly passed War Powers Act. Eventually, White House lawyers determined that the use of American forces to rescue citizens in an emergency was unlikely to run afoul of the law, but the legality of using military assets to withdraw refugees was unknown.

=== Refugees ===
While American citizens were generally assured of a simple way to leave the country just by showing up to an evacuation point, South Vietnamese who wanted to leave Saigon before it fell often resorted to independent arrangements. The under-the-table payments required to gain a passport and exit visa jumped sixfold, and the price of seagoing vessels tripled. Those who owned property in the city were often forced to sell it at a substantial loss or abandon it altogether; the asking price of one particularly impressive house was cut 75 percent within a two-week period. American visas were of enormous value, and Vietnamese seeking American sponsors posted advertisements in newspapers. One such ad read: "Seeking adoptive parents. Poor diligent students" followed by names, birthdates, and identity card numbers. A disproportionate fraction of Vietnamese in the 1975 wave of emigration who later achieved refugee status in the United States were former members of the South Vietnamese government and military. Though most expected to find political and personal freedom in the United States on account of their anti-Communist bonafides, they often encountered an unexpected and complex resettlement process, involving stays in U.S. military-operated processing centers for varying lengths of time before they could begin their new lives in America.

== Political movements and attempts to effect a negotiated solution ==
As the North Vietnamese chipped away at more and more of South Vietnam's territory, internal opposition to Thiệu continued to accumulate. For instance, in early April, the Senate unanimously voted through a call for new leadership, and some top military commanders were pressing for a coup. In response to this pressure, Thiệu made some changes in his cabinet, and Prime Minister Trần Thiện Khiêm resigned. This did little to reduce the opposition to Thiệu. On 8 April, a South Vietnamese pilot and secret communist, Nguyễn Thành Trung, bombed the Independence Palace and then flew to a PAVN-controlled airstrip; Thiệu was not hurt.

Many in the American mission—Martin in particular—along with some key figures in Washington, believed that negotiations with the communists were still possible, especially if Saigon could stabilize the military situation. Martin's hope was that North Vietnam's leaders would be willing to allow a "phased withdrawal" whereby a gradual departure might be achieved to allow helpful locals and all Americans to leave (along with full military withdrawal) over a period of months.

Opinions were divided on whether any government which would be headed by Thiệu could affect such a political solution. The foreign minister of the Provisional Revolutionary Government (PRG) had indicated, on 2 April, that the PRG might negotiate with a Saigon government that did not include Thiệu. Thus, even among Thiệu's supporters, pressure was growing for his ouster.

Thiệu resigned on 21 April. His remarks were particularly hard on the Americans, first for forcing South Vietnam to accede to the Paris Peace Accords, second for failing to support South Vietnam afterwards, and all the while asking South Vietnam "to do an impossible thing, like filling up the oceans with stones." The presidency was turned over to Vice President Trần Văn Hương. The view of the North Vietnamese government, broadcast by Radio Hanoi, was that the new regime was merely "another puppet regime."

== Last days ==
=== PAVN's encirclement ===
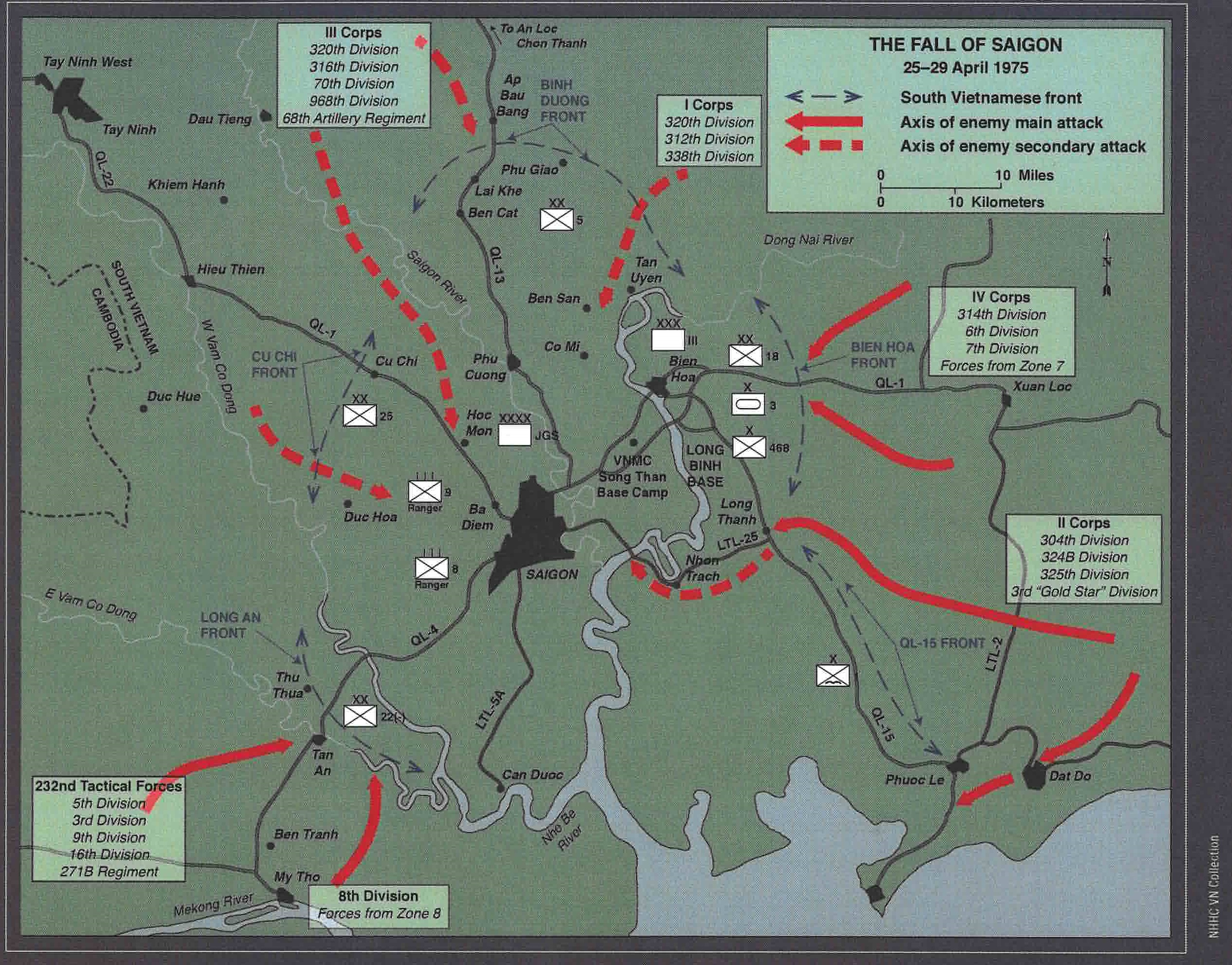
Map showing PAVN encirclement of Saigon

At the Phước Tuy front, the PAVN 3rd Division (Sao Vàng) opened fire around 6:00 PM on 26 April. The PAVN tanks penetrated Bà Rịa, but the infantry was unable to keep up, allowing the 1st Airborne Brigade to counterattack and drive them back. However, the PAVN pressure forced General Hinh to withdraw his forces to the other side of the Cỏ May River. Hinh ordered the destruction of the bridge, which the airborne accomplished on the afternoon of 27 April. The two airborne battalions trapped on the Bà Rịa side had to cross the marshy salt flats to reach the other bank. The blocking of Route 15 at Bà Rịa forced the DAO to abandon its large-scale evacuation plan via Vũng Tàu.

On 27 April, Saigon was hit by PAVN rockets—the first in more than 40 months.

With his overtures to the North rebuffed out of hand, Hương resigned on 28 April and was succeeded by General Dương Văn Minh. Minh took over a regime that was by this time in a state of utter collapse. He had longstanding ties with the Communists, and it was hoped he could negotiate a ceasefire; however, Hanoi was in no mood to negotiate. On 28 April, PAVN forces fought their way into the outskirts of the city. At the Newport Bridge (Cầu Tân Cảng), about five kilometres (three miles) from the city centre, the VC seized the Thảo Điền area at the eastern end of the bridge and attempted to seize the bridge but were repulsed by the ARVN 12th Airborne Battalion. As Bien Hoa was falling, Toàn fled to Saigon, informing the government that most of the top ARVN leadership had virtually resigned themselves to defeat.

At 18:06 on 28 April, as Minh finished his acceptance speech three A-37 Dragonflies piloted by former Republic of Vietnam Air Force (VNAF) pilots, who had defected to the Vietnamese People's Air Force at the fall of Da Nang, dropped six Mk81 250 lb bombs on Tan Son Nhut Air Base damaging aircraft. VNAF F-5s took off in pursuit, but they were unable to intercept the A-37s. C-130s leaving Tan Son Nhut reported receiving PAVN .50 cal and 37 mm anti-aircraft (AAA) fire while sporadic PAVN rocket and artillery attacks also started to hit the airport and air base. C-130 flights were stopped temporarily after the air attack but resumed at 20:00 on 28 April. The following day, Minh sent a letter to US Ambassador Martin, requesting that all staff of the US Defense Attaché Office (DAO) leave South Vietnam within 24 hours.

At 03:58 on 29 April, C-130E, #72-1297, flown by a crew from the 776th Tactical Airlift Squadron, was destroyed by a 122 mm rocket while taxiing to pick up refugees after offloading a BLU-82 at the base. The crew evacuated the burning aircraft on the taxiway and departed the airfield on another C-130 that had previously landed. This was the last USAF fixed-wing aircraft to leave Tan Son Nhut.

At dawn on 29 April the VNAF began to haphazardly depart Tan Son Nhut Air Base as A-37s, F-5s, C-7s, C-119s and C-130s departed for Thailand while UH-1s took off in search of the ships of Task Force 76. Some VNAF aircraft stayed to continue to fight the advancing PAVN. One AC-119 gunship had spent the night of 28/29 April dropping flares and firing on the approaching PAVN. At dawn on 29 April, two A-1 Skyraiders began patrolling the perimeter of Tan Son Nhut at 2,500 ft (760 m) until one was shot down, presumably by an SA-7 missile. At 07:00 the AC-119 was firing on PAVN to the east of Tan Son Nhut when it too was hit by an SA-7 and fell in flames to the ground.

At 06:00 on 29 April, Dũng was ordered by the Politburo to "strike with the greatest determination straight into the enemy's final lair." After one day of bombardment and general offensive, the PAVN were ready to make their final push into the city.

At 08:00 on 29 April, Lieutenant General Trần Văn Minh, commander of the VNAF and 30 of his staff arrived at the DAO Compound demanding evacuation, signifying the complete loss of VNAF command and control.

At 09:00 on 29 April, the Tan Son Nhut Air Base was bombarded a second time. Damage was extensive. Aircraft in parking areas, including A-37s and in particular four C- 130s already loaded with bombs were hit and exploded. Fires spread rapidly at every place. The air base was completely out of operation and in disorder. By 10:00, Air Force Headquarters was no longer in control of its personnel. Also at 10:00 on 29 April, III Corps reported that the situation was critical. It had lost contact with Hậu Nghĩa Sector Headquarters. The 25th Division continued to clash violently with the PAVN and requested more helicopter support. The Trảng Bom defense line was totally shattered, and the 18th Division was now battling the PAVN south of Long Bình base. In the base itself, disorder prevailed; command and control were no longer possible. The 5th Division at Tân Uyên District Town had been overrun at 09:00, and PAVN troops were advancing toward Biên Hòa.

III Corps was no longer receiving any air support. It was impossible for the CMD Command to relieve enemy pressure south of Saigon. Its commander, Lieutenant General Nguyễn Văn Minh, requested troops from JGS to reinforce the southern defense perimeter. Two out of three airborne Ranger companies held in reserve at JGS were immediately released for his use. A Ranger group which was then operating on south of Ben Tranh was called back to Can Duoc at 12:00 to be placed under CMD command. But the movement could not be carried out because helicopters were no longer available. Interprovincial Route 5A connecting Cho Lon with Can Duoc was also interdicted at several places, and it was impossible to dislodge the enemy from the Nhi Thien Duong Bridge. Meanwhile, the Thanh Tuy Ha ammunition depot was badly hit and disintegrated in violent explosions. Contact with the depot was lost at 13:00. PAVN tanks by now had appeared at Cat Lai and were firing at the ammunition unloading pier. Completely surrounded and isolated, left without support and without reinforcement, the Capital Military District was waiting helplessly to be conquered.

At the Long An front, on the morning of 28 April, the PAVN 3rd Division (Phước Long) (or 303rd) successfully crossed the Vàm Cỏ Đông River at the An Ninh - Lộc Giang bridge. The Phước Long Division then turned south to attack the provincial capital of Hậu Nghĩa, Khiêm Cương, and captured it by a tank-led attack at dawn on 29 April. Around 11:30, the RF and an armored squadron of the 25th Division abandoned the town and retreated towards Saigon; Hậu Nghĩa was overrun. South of Saigon, in the mean time, the PAVN 5th Division finally captured a bridge on Route 4 after three attacks. By constructing obstacles and laying mines, the PAVN blocked any potential retreat from Saigon to the IV Corps.

=== Operation Frequent Wind ===
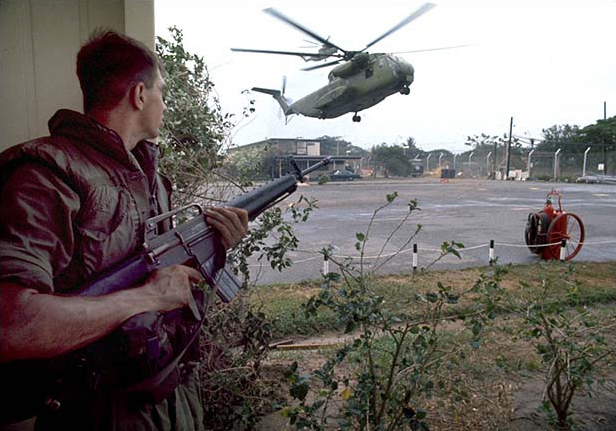
A U.S. Marine holding an M16A1 provides security as American helicopters land at the DAO compound

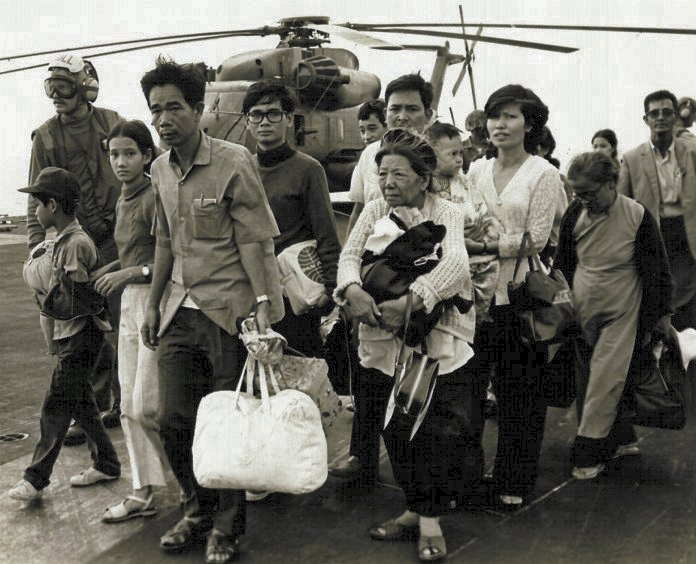
South Vietnamese refugees arrive on a U.S. Navy vessel during Operation Frequent Wind

The continuing rocket fire and debris on the runways at Tan Son Nhut caused General Homer D. Smith, the U.S. defense attaché in Saigon, to advise Martin that the runways were unfit for use and that the emergency evacuation of Saigon would need to be completed by helicopter. Originally, Martin had intended to effect the evacuation by use of fixed-wing aircraft from the base. This plan was altered at a critical time when a South Vietnamese pilot decided to defect, and jettisoned his ordnance along the only runways still in use (which had not yet been destroyed by shelling).

Under pressure from Kissinger, Martin forced Marine guards to take him to Tan Son Nhut in the midst of continued shelling, so he might personally assess the situation. After seeing that fixed-wing departures were not an option (a decision Martin did not want to make without firsthand knowledge of the situation on the ground, in case the helicopter lift failed), Martin gave the green light for the helicopter evacuation to begin in earnest.

Reports came in from the outskirts of the city that the PAVN were closing in. At 10:48, Martin relayed to Kissinger his desire to activate Operation Frequent Wind, the helicopter evacuation of U.S. personnel and at-risk Vietnamese. At 10:51 on 29 April, the order was given by CINCPAC to commence Operation Frequent Wind. The American radio station began regular play of Irving Berlin's "White Christmas", the signal for American personnel to move immediately to the evacuation points.

Under this plan, CH-53 and CH-46 helicopters were used to evacuate Americans and friendly Vietnamese to ships, including the Seventh Fleet, in the South China Sea. The main evacuation point was the DAO Compound at Tan Son Nhut; buses moved through the city picking up passengers and driving them out to the airport, with the first buses arriving at Tan Son Nhut shortly after noon. The first CH-53 landed at the DAO compound in the afternoon, and by the evening, 395 Americans and more than 4,000 Vietnamese had been evacuated. By 23:00 the U.S. Marines who were providing security were withdrawing and arranging the destruction of the DAO office, American equipment, files, and cash. Air America UH-1s also participated in the evacuation.

The original evacuation plans had not called for a large-scale helicopter operation at the United States Embassy, Saigon. Helicopters and buses were to shuttle people from the embassy to the DAO Compound. However, in the course of the evacuation it turned out that a few thousand people were stranded at the embassy, including many Vietnamese. Additional Vietnamese civilians gathered outside the embassy and scaled the walls, hoping to claim refugee status. Thunderstorms increased the difficulty of helicopter operations. Nevertheless, the evacuation from the embassy continued more or less unbroken throughout the evening and night.

At 03:45 on the morning of 30 April, Kissinger and Ford ordered Martin to evacuate only Americans from that point forward. Reluctantly, Martin announced that only Americans were to be flown out, due to worries that the North Vietnamese would soon take the city and the Ford administration's desire to announce the completion of the American evacuation. Martin was ordered by Ford to board the evacuation helicopter. The call sign of that helicopter was "Lady Ace 09", and the pilot carried direct orders from Ford for Martin to be on board. The pilot, Gerry Berry, had the orders written in grease-pencil on his kneepads. Martin's wife, Dorothy, had already been evacuated by previous flights, and left behind her suitcase so a South Vietnamese woman might be able to squeeze on board with her.

"Lady Ace 09" from USMC squadron HMM-165 and piloted by Berry, took off at 04:58—though he did not know it, had Martin refused to leave, the Marines had a reserve order to arrest him and carry him away to ensure his safety. The embassy evacuation had flown out 978 Americans and about 1,100 Vietnamese. The Marines who had been securing the embassy followed at dawn, with the last aircraft leaving at 07:53. 420 Vietnamese and South Koreans were left behind in the embassy compound, with an additional crowd gathered outside the walls.

The Americans and the refugees they flew out were generally allowed to leave without intervention from either the North or South Vietnamese. Pilots of helicopters heading to Tan Son Nhut were aware that PAVN anti-aircraft guns were tracking them, but they refrained from firing. The Hanoi leadership, reckoning that completion of the evacuation would lessen the risk of American intervention, had instructed Dũng not to target the airlift itself. Meanwhile, members of the police in Saigon had been promised evacuation in exchange for protecting the American evacuation buses and control of the crowds in the city during the evacuation.

Although this was the end of the American military operation, Vietnamese continued to leave the country by boat and, where possible, by aircraft. VNAF pilots who had access to helicopters flew them offshore to the American fleet, where they were able to land. Many VNAF helicopters were dumped into the ocean to make room on the decks for more aircraft. VNAF fighters and other planes also sought refuge in Thailand while two O-1s landed on USS Midway.

Martin was flown out to the USS Blue Ridge, where he pleaded for helicopters to return to the embassy compound to pick up the few hundred remaining hopefuls waiting to be evacuated. Although his pleas were overruled by Ford, Martin was able to convince the Seventh Fleet to remain on station for several days so any locals who could make their way to sea via boat or aircraft might be rescued by the waiting Americans.

Many Vietnamese nationals who were evacuated were allowed to enter the United States under the Indochina Migration and Refugee Assistance Act.

Decades later, when the U.S. government reestablished diplomatic relations with Vietnam, the former embassy building was returned to the United States. The historic staircase that led to the rooftop helicopter pad in the nearby apartment building used by the CIA and other U.S. government employees was salvaged and is on permanent display at the Gerald R. Ford Museum in Grand Rapids, Michigan.

=== Final assault ===
In the early hours of 30 April, Dũng received orders from the Politburo to attack. He then ordered his field commanders to advance directly to key facilities and strategic points in the city. The first PAVN unit to enter the city was the 324th Division. By now, the government had not made any sort of appeals to the people for donations of blood, food, etc.

On the morning of 30 April, PAVN sappers attempted to seize the Newport Bridge but were repulsed by the ARVN Airborne. At 09:00 the PAVN tank column approached the bridge and came under fire from ARVN tanks which destroyed the lead T-54, killing the PAVN Battalion commander.

The ARVN 3rd Task Force, 81st Ranger Group commanded by Major Phạm Châu Tài defended Tan Son Nhut and they were joined by the remnants of the Loi Ho unit. At 07:15 on 30 April, the PAVN 24th Regiment approached the Bay Hien intersection (10.793°N 106.653°E) 1.5 km from the main gate of Tan Son Nhut Air Base. The lead T-54 was hit by M67 recoilless rifle and then the next T-54 was hit by a shell from an M48 tank. The PAVN infantry moved forward and engaged the ARVN in house to house fighting forcing them to withdraw to the base by 08:45. The PAVN then sent three tanks and an infantry battalion to assault the main gate and they were met by intensive anti-tank and machine gun fire knocking out the three tanks and killing at least 20 PAVN soldiers. The PAVN tried to bring forward an 85 mm antiaircraft gun, but the ARVN knocked it out before it could start firing. The PAVN 10th Division ordered eight more tanks and another infantry battalion to join the attack, but as they approached the Bay Hien intersection they were hit by an airstrike from VNAF jets operating from Binh Thuy Air Base which destroyed two T-54s. The six surviving tanks arrived at the main gate at 10:00 and began their attack, with two being knocked out by antitank fire in front of the gate and another destroyed as it attempted a flanking manoeuvre. Also on 30 April 1975 as the PAVN 2nd Corps deep penetration unit advanced towards Saigon, soldiers at Thủ Đức Military Academy engaged the PAVN armored column on Route 15. Several tanks were detached to deal with the resistance and one was destroyed before the soldiers at the academy surrendered.

At 10:24, Minh announced an unconditional surrender. He ordered all ARVN troops "to cease hostilities in calm and to stay where they are", while inviting the Provisional Revolutionary Government to engage in "a ceremony of orderly transfer of power so as to avoid any unnecessary bloodshed in the population".

At approximately 10:30, Tài at Tan Son Nhut Air Base heard of the surrender broadcast and went to the Joint General Staff Compound to seek instructions. He called Minh who told him to prepare to surrender. Tài reportedly told Minh, "If Viet Cong tanks are entering Independence Palace we will come down there to rescue you, sir." Minh refused Tài's suggestion and Tài then told his men to withdraw from the base gates. At 11:30 the PAVN entered the base.

At Newport Bridge the ARVN and PAVN continued to exchange tank and artillery fire until the ARVN commander received Minh's capitulation order over the radio. While the bridge was rigged with approximately 4,000 pounds (1,800 kg) of demolition charges, the ARVN stood down and at 10:30 the PAVN column crossed the bridge.

=== Capitulation and final surrender announcement ===
The photo by Françoise Demulder showed the two tanks at the gates while tank 390 technically entered first and Lieutenant Bùi Quang Thận was running with the VC flag in his hand

PAVN 203rd Tank Brigade (from 2nd Corps of Major general Nguyễn Hữu An) under Commander Nguyễn Tất Tài and Commissar Bùi Văn Tùng was the first unit to burst through the gates of the Independence Palace around noon. Tank 843 (a Soviet T-54 tank) was the first to directly hit and struck the side gate of the Palace. This historic moment was recorded by the Australian cameraman Neil Davis. Tank 390 (a Chinese Type 59 tank) then crashed through the main gate in the middle to enter the front yard. For many years, the official record of Vietnamese government and international historical sources maintained that tank 843 was the first one to enter the Presidential Palace. However, in 1995, French war photographer Françoise Demulder published her photo which showed that tank 390 entered the main gate while tank 843 was still behind the steel columns of the smaller gate on the right hand side (view from inside) and tank 843's commander Bùi Quang Thận was running with the Vietcong flag on his hand. Both tanks were declared national treasures in 2012 and each was displayed in a different museum in Hanoi. Lieutenant Thận pulled down the Flag of South Vietnam on top of the Palace and raised the Viet Cong flag at 11:30 am on 30 April 1975.

The Tank Brigade 203 soldiers entered the Palace and found Minh and all members of his cabinet sitting and waiting for them. Commissar Tùng arrived at the Palace ten minutes after the first tanks. Minh realised this was the highest-ranking officer around then said: "We are waiting to hand over the cabinet", Tùng replied immediately: "You have nothing to hand over but your unconditional surrender to us". Tùng then wrote a speech announcing the surrender and dissolution of what remained of the South Vietnamese government. He then escorted Minh to the Radio Saigon to read it to avoid further needless bloodshed. The surrender announcement was recorded by German journalist Börries Gallasch's tape recorder.

Colonel Bùi Tín, a military journalist was at the Palace around noon to witness the events. In his memoir, he confirmed that Lt. Col. Bùi Văn Tùng was the one who accepted the surrender and wrote the statement for Minh. In a previous interview with WGBH Educational Foundation in 1981, he had falsely claimed that he was the first high officer who met Minh and accepted the surrender (with Tùng's words). This claim was repeated after his defection from Vietnam and sometimes cited mistakenly by foreign correspondents and historians.

At 2:30, Minh announced the formal surrender of South Vietnam:

I, General Dương Văn Minh, president of the Saigon administration, appeal to the armed forces of the Republic of Vietnam to lay down their arms and surrender unconditionally to the forces of the Liberation Army of South Vietnam. Furthermore, I declare that the Saigon government is completely dissolved at all levels. From the Central government to the local governments must be handed over to the Provisional Revolutionary Government of the Republic of South Vietnam.

— Dương Văn Minh, on the transcript written by Bùi Văn Tùng

Tùng then took the microphone and announced:

We, the representatives for the forces of the Liberation Army of South Vietnam, solemnly declare that the City of Saigon was completely liberated. We accepted the unconditional surrender of General Dương Văn Minh, the president of the Saigon administration

— Bùi Văn Tùng

This announcement marked the end of the Vietnam War.

== Aftermath ==
=== Turnover of Saigon ===
The communists renamed the city after Ho Chi Minh, former President of North Vietnam, although the name "Saigon" continues to be used by many residents and others to this day. Order was slowly restored, although the by-then-deserted U.S. embassy was looted, along with many businesses. Communications between the outside world and Saigon were cut. The Viet Cong machinery in South Vietnam was weakened, owing in part to the Phoenix Program, so the PAVN was responsible for maintaining order and General Trần Văn Trà, Dũng's administrative deputy, was placed in charge of the city. The new authorities held a victory rally on 7 May.

One objective of the Communist Party of Vietnam was to reduce the population of Saigon, which had become swollen with an influx of people during the war and was now overcrowded, with high unemployment. "Re-education classes" for former soldiers in the ARVN indicated that to regain full standing in society they would need to move from the city and take up farming. Handouts of rice to the poor, while forthcoming, were tied to pledges to leave Saigon for the countryside. According to the Vietnamese government, within two years of the capture of the city one million people had left Saigon, and the state had a target of 500,000 further departures.

Following the end of the war, according to official and non-official estimates, between 200,000 and 300,000 South Vietnamese were sent to re-education camps, where many endured torture, starvation, and disease while they were being forced to do hard labor.

=== The evacuation ===
Whether the evacuation had been successful or not has been questioned following the end of the war. Operation Frequent Wind was generally described by Western sources as an impressive achievement—Dũng stated this in his memoirs and The New York Times described it as being carried out with "efficiency and bravery". On the other hand, the airlift was also criticized for being too slow and hesitant, and it was inadequate in removing Vietnamese civilians and soldiers who were connected with the American presence.

The U.S. State Department estimated that the Vietnamese employees of the U.S. Embassy in South Vietnam, past and present, and their families totaled 90,000 people. In his testimony to Congress, Martin said that 22,294 such people had been evacuated by the end of April.

An iconic photograph of evacuees entering an Air America helicopter on the roof of the apartment building at 22 Gia Long Street is frequently mischaracterized as showing an evacuation from the "U.S. Embassy" via a "military" helicopter.

== Commemoration ==
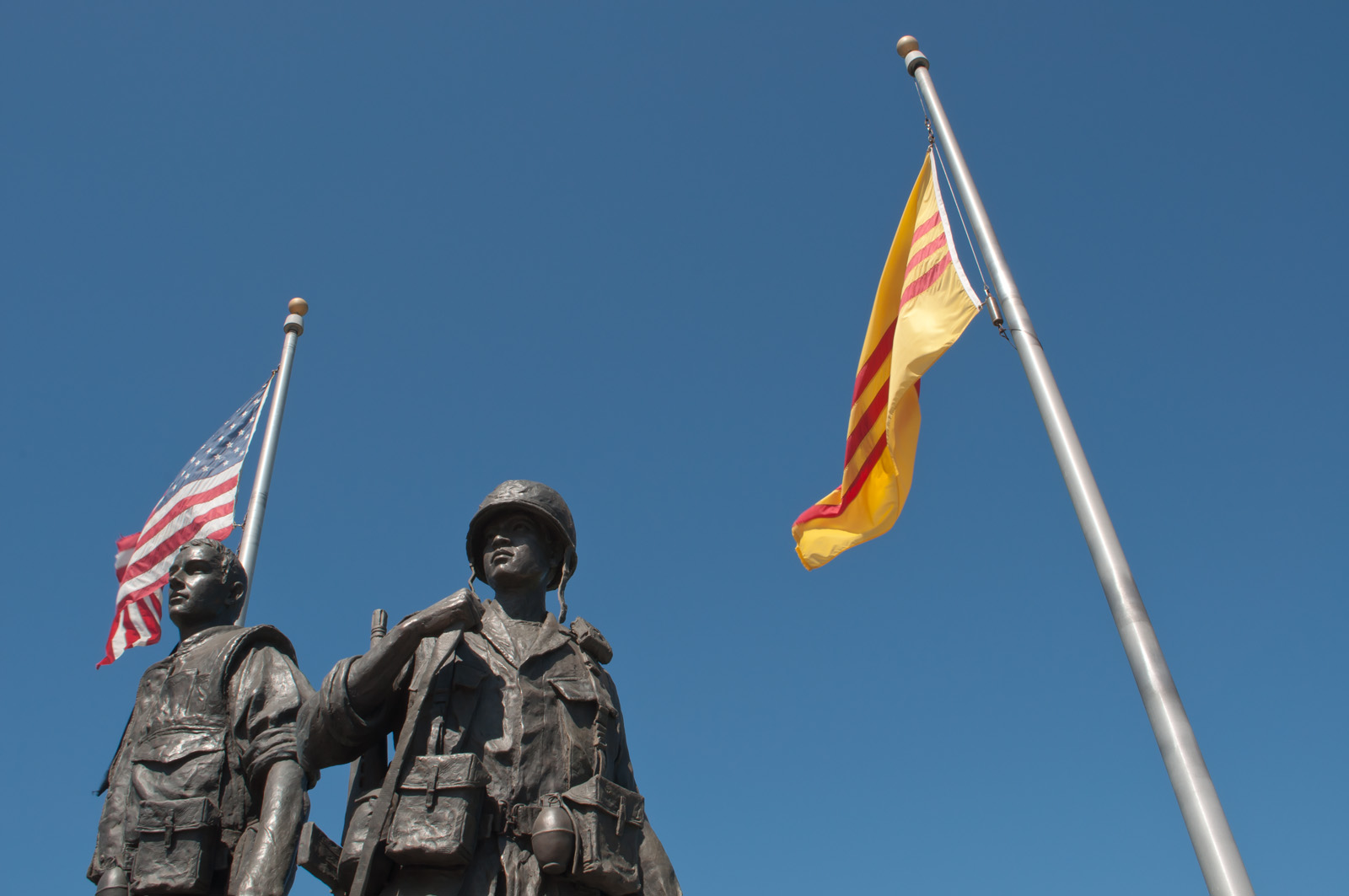
The Vietnam War Memorial is located in Westminster, California, honoring the US and South Vietnamese armies in the Vietnam War.

30 April is celebrated as a public holiday in Vietnam as "Reunification Day" (though the official reunification actually occurred on 2 July 1976) or "Liberation Day of the South" (Ngày giải phóng miền Nam). Along with International Workers' Day on 1 May, most people take the day off work and public celebrations are organized. In 2025, Vietnamese government throws a large-scale celebration of 50th anniversary of the reunification of Vietnam in Ho Chi Minh City, featuring fireworks, drone shows, military parades, and concerts, attracting large audiences and generating attention on social media and international coverage.

Among South Vietnamese émigrés, the week of 30 April is referred to as "Black April" or "National Day of Shame" (Ngày quốc hận) due to the notion that South Vietnam was taken over by the communists. It is commemorated as a time of lamentation for the fall of all of Vietnam under communist rule. In 2015, Canada implemented the Journey to Freedom Day Act, which designates 30 April every year as a day of remembrance across Canada, marking the fall of Saigon and the subsequent exodus of Vietnamese refugees.

== See also ==
- History of Vietnam
- Fall of Phnom Penh
- Communist takeover of Laos
- 1975 in the Vietnam War
- Indochina refugee crisis
- Re-education camp (Vietnam)
- Withdrawal from Aden
- Fall of Kabul (1992)
- Fall of Kabul (2021)
- Fall of Damascus (2024)

== Sources ==
- Brown, Weldon A. (1976). The Last Chopper: The Dénouement of the American Role in Vietnam, 1963–1975. Kennikat Press. ISBN 0-8046-9121-5.
- Dawson, Alan (1977). 55 Days: The Fall of South Vietnam. Prentice-Hall. ISBN 0-13-314476-3.
- Isaacs, Arnold (1983). Without Honor: Defeat in Vietnam and Cambodia. The Johns Hopkins University Press. ISBN 0-8018-6107-1.
- Kissinger, Henry (2003). Ending the Vietnam War: A History of America's Involvement in and Extrication from the Vietnam War. Simon & Schuster. ISBN 0-7432-1532-X.
- Moise, Edwin E. (Fall 1988). "Nationalism and Communism in Vietnam". Journal of Third World Studies. 5 (2). University Press of Florida: 6–22. JSTOR 45193059.
- Pike, Douglas (1970). The Viet-Cong Strategy of Terror (PDF). Archived from the original (PDF) on 20 July 2011 – via Texas Tech University.
- Smith, Homer D. (22 May 1975). "The Final Forty-Five Days in Vietnam" (PDF). vietnam.ttu.edu. Archived from the original (PDF) on 20 July 2011.
- Snepp, Frank (1977). Decent Interval: An Insider's Account of Saigon's Indecent End Told by the CIA's Chief Strategy Analyst in Vietnam. Random House. ISBN 0-394-40743-1.
- Tanner, Stephen (2000). Epic Retreats: From 1776 to the Evacuation of Saigon. Sarpedon. ISBN 1-885119-57-7. (See especially p. 273 and on.)
- Todd, Olivier (1990) [1987 (in French)]. Cruel April: The Fall of Saigon. W. W. Norton & Company. ISBN 0-393-02787-2.
- Willbanks, James H. (2004). Abandoning Vietnam: How America Left and South Vietnam Lost Its War. University Press of Kansas. ISBN 978-0-7006-1331-1.
