= Halton Regional Police Service =

Policing service for the Regional Municipality of Halton in Ontario, Canada

- Motto: Progress Through Participation

Agency overview
- Formed: 1974

Operational structure
- Headquarters: 2485 North Service Road West Oakville, Ontario
- Sworn members: 718
- Unsworn members: 302
- Elected officer responsible: Hon. Michael Kerzner, Solicitor General of Ontario
- Agency executive: Stephen J. Tanner, Chief of police

Facilities
- Districts: 3

Website
- http://www.haltonpolice.ca

The Halton Regional Police Service provides policing service for the Regional Municipality of Halton, which is located southwest of Toronto, in Ontario, Canada. Halton Region encompasses the city of Burlington and the Towns of Oakville, Milton and Halton Hills. As of July 2020, the Halton Regional Police Service has over 1,000 members, including 718 sworn police officers and approximately 302 civilian and volunteer members. The service is responsible for policing a population of approximately 610,000 people in an area covering 692 square kilometers.

The chief of police is the highest-ranking officer of the Halton Regional Police Service who governs the entire police service. Stephen J. Tanner began his term on September 1, 2012, and was sworn in on September 4. The chief reports to the seven-person Halton Police Services Board which is independent of the Municipal or Regional Council.

== History ==
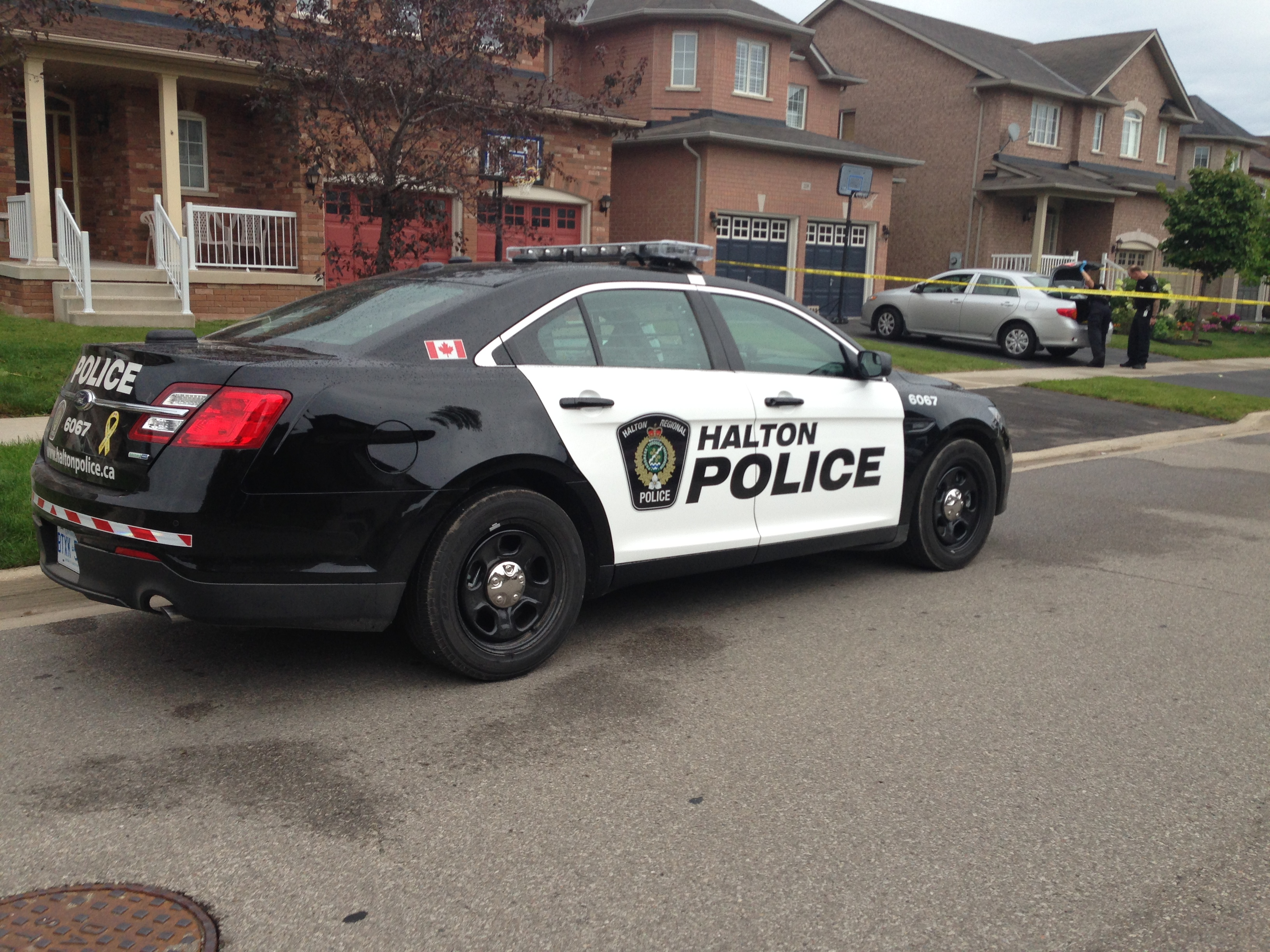
A Halton Regional Police car with the black and white colour scheme parked at a crime scene

The Halton Regional Police Service was established in tandem with creating the Regional Municipality of Halton on January 1, 1974. It incorporated the former police services of Burlington, Oakville, Milton, and Halton Hills and first consisted of 205 officers and 45 civilians. The Ontario Provincial Police continued to police the remainder of the region until 1975 when the regional force had expanded to the point where it could assume responsibility for the entire area. In 2018 the new Halton Regional Police Service Headquarters at 2485 North Service Rd. W. was opened. The new facility totals 230,000 square feet in area.

=== Crest ===
- St. Edward's Crown
- Ribbon containing Halton's motto Progress Through Participation
- Shield is based on the one for the Halton Region
- Trillium-the official flower of Ontario
- Wreath of golden leaves

== Organization ==
The HRPS divides the region into five divisions (police stations) within three districts and one headquarters.

=== Headquarters ===
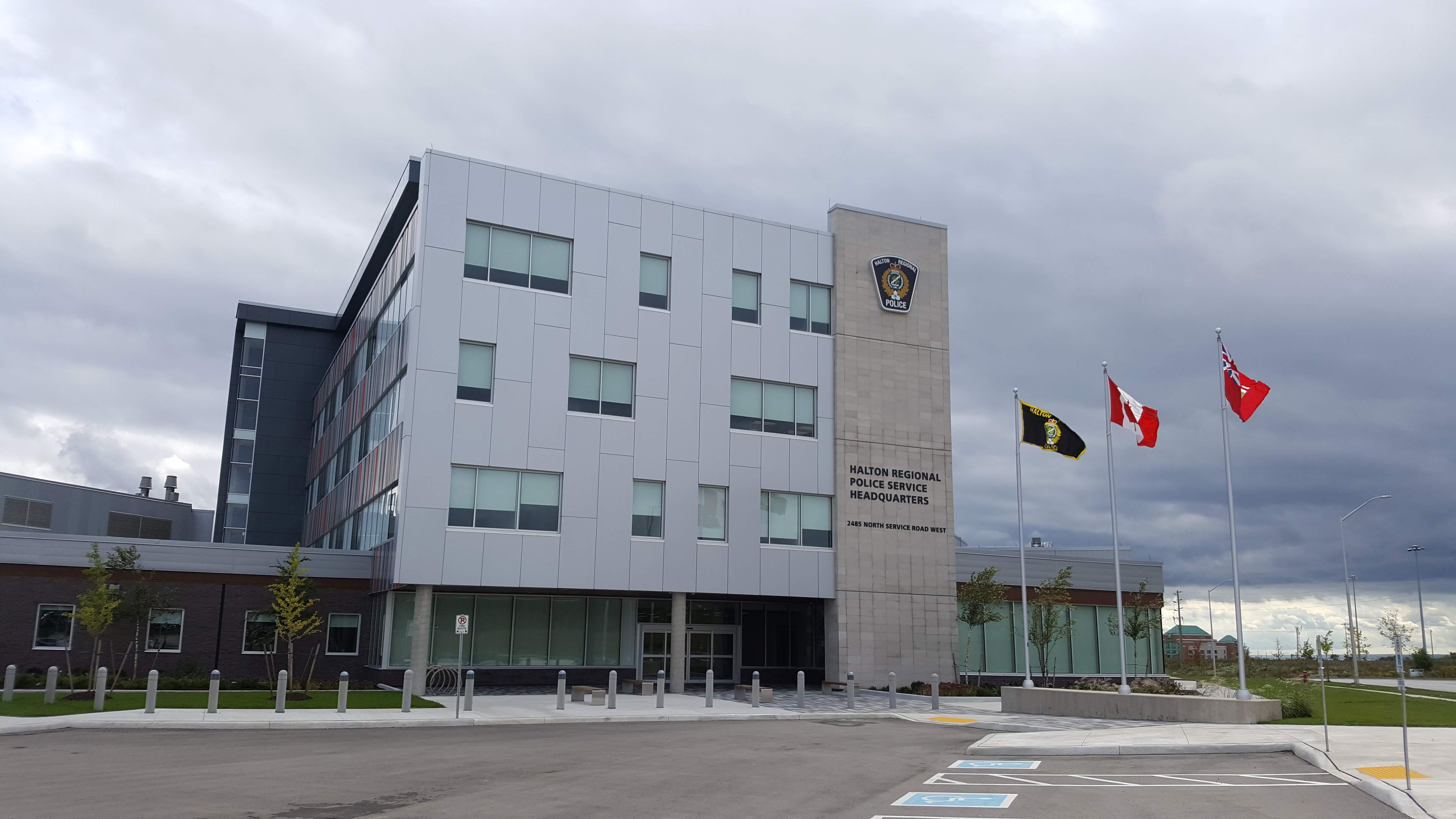
Halton Regional Police Service Headquarters opened in September 2018

2485 North Service Road West, Oakville, Ontario, L6M 3H8

Chief Stephen J. Tanner

Deputy Chief Roger Wilkie

Deputy Chief Jeff Hill

Deputy Chief Kevin Maher

=== District 1 ===
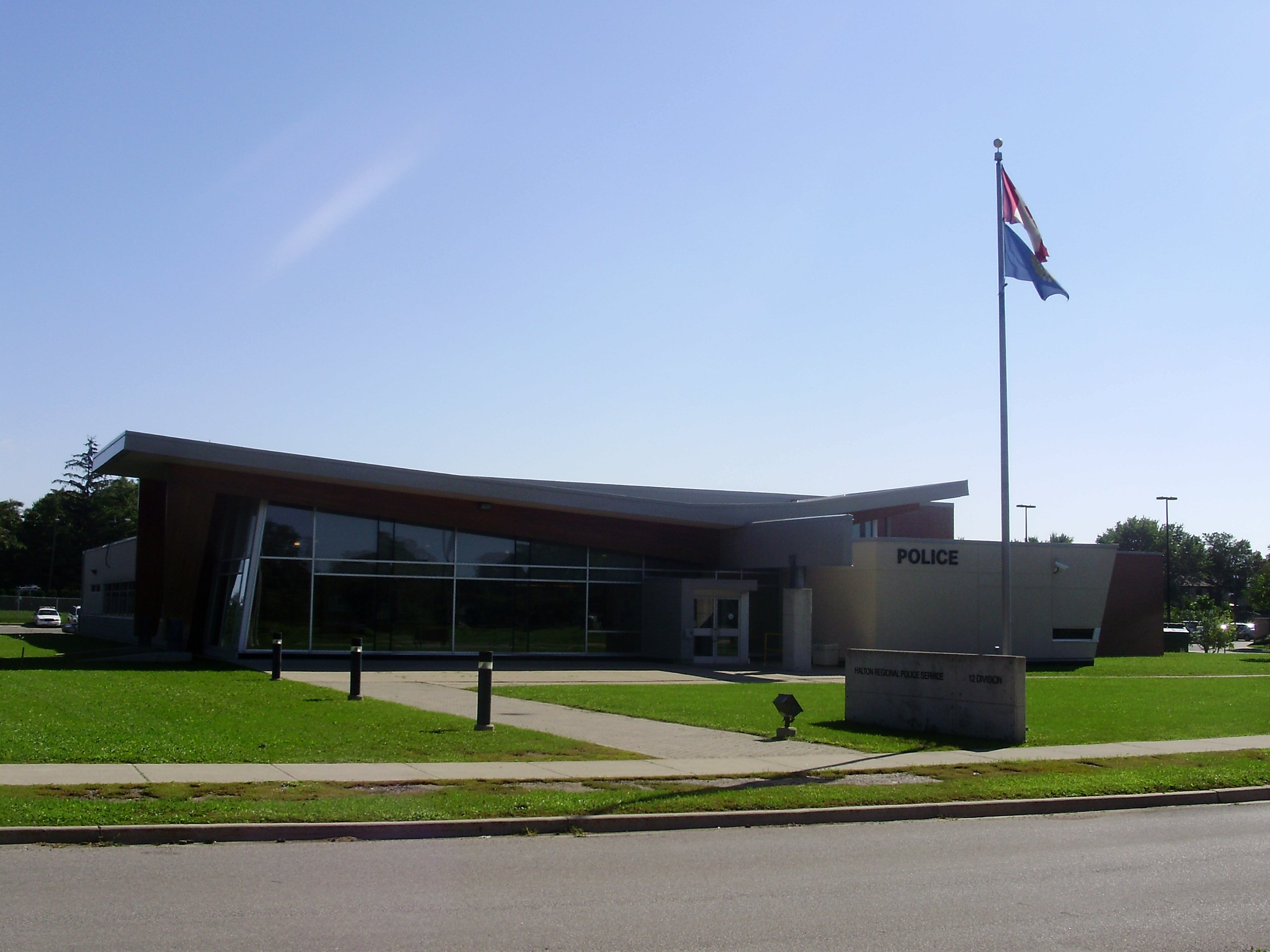
12 Division of the Halton Regional Police

Commanded by Superintendent Dave Stewart, Inspector Bruce Dickson

- 10 Division - 315 Queen Street, Acton (Queen Street Substation)
- 11 Division - 217 Guelph Street, Georgetown
- 12 Division - 490 Childs Drive, Milton

=== District 2 ===
Commanded by Superintendent Jeff Sandy and Inspector Crystal Dodds

- 20 Division - 95 Oak Walk Drive, Oakville

=== District 3 ===
Commanded by Superintendent Derek Davis and Inspector John van der Lelie

- 30 Division-3800 Constable Henshaw Boulevard, Burlington

=== Rank structure ===
Commanding officers

- Chief of Police
- Deputy Chief of Regional Operations
- Deputy Chief of District Operations

Senior police officers

- Superintendent
- Inspector

Police officers

- Staff Sergeant / Detective Sergeant
- Sergeant / Detective
- Constable

== Cadet Program ==
The Halton Regional Police Service established its one-year Police Cadet program in June 2009. The primary purpose of the Police Cadet program is to promote and enhance the career development and experience of future Police Constable candidates. The Cadets assist front-line officers throughout the region, at community events. They are also assigned to a platoon, assigned a mentor officer, and exposed to all facets of front-line police work. They have the following desired qualifications for cadets:

- Between the ages of 19-24
- Recent post-secondary education or post-secondary graduate

== Units ==
Halton Regional Police Service operations are divided into several specialized units. These units are not limited to Regional Drugs and Organized Crime, Human Trafficking, Firearms, Intelligence and Offender Management units, Child Abuse and Sexual Assault, Domestic Violence, Fraud, Homicide, Canine, Technology Crime, Tactical Rescue Unit, Marine, Explosive Disposal Unit, Marine Unit and a Regional Community Mobilization Bureau which includes School Liaison Officers, Community Safety and Well-Being, Crisis Outreach and Support Team, Mobile Crisis Rapid Response Team and Auxiliary Division. Investigators are also assigned at the district level to the criminal investigation bureau which investigates crimes against the public and property.

The police service also has a ceremonial wing responsible for representing the police force at local events, parades, and police ceremonies. The Ceremonial Services comprises the Color Guard, which is responsible for escorting the Military colors, standards, and guidons|police colors on functions where their presence is required; the Chorus, a vocal group composed of civilian volunteers and serving police officers; and the Pipes & Drums, another musical ensemble which plays in a variety of parades and community events in the Halton area.

== Community Policing Philosophy ==
The Halton Regional Police Service is widely known as one of the most progressive community policing services in Canada with its strong emphasis on the community. Community policing in the Halton region is a philosophy based on the concept that police officers and members of the public work together, in partnership, resulting in creative ways to solve contemporary community problems related to crime, fear of crime, social and physical order, and neighborhood decay. In recent years the Halton Regional Police has incorporated an intelligence-led policing strategy built around risk assessment and risk management, utilizing analysis of crime trends to affect an appropriate policing response.

== Special Investigations Unit ==
The actions of police officers in the Province of Ontario are overseen by the Special Investigations Unit (SIU) of Ontario, a civilian agency responsible for investigating circumstances involving police and civilians that have resulted in a death, serious injury, or allegations of sexual assault. The SIU is dedicated to maintaining one law, ensuring equal justice before the law among both the police and the public. Their goal is to ensure that the criminal law is applied appropriately to police conduct, as determined through independent investigations, increasing public confidence in the police services. Complaints involving police conduct that do not result in a serious injury or death must be referred to the appropriate police service or another oversight agency, such as the Ontario Civilian Commission on Police Services.

== Fleet ==
- Ford Expedition
- Dodge Charger Police Cruiser
- Ford Taurus Police Interceptor
- Ford Explorer Police Utility
- Dodge RAM Unmarked
- Dodge Grand Caravan Unmarked
- Chevrolet Equinox LT Unmarked
- Chrysler 300 Unmarked
- Two Mobile Command Units - 31” Freightliner MT45 based RV and 26” Ford F-550 cutaway chassis
- Iconic X-One Ford F-150 Super Duty chassis Marine Unit

Terradyne Armored Vehicles Gurkha

- Three Terradyne Armored Vehicles Gurkha Armored Response Vehicle
- Chevrolet Tahoe (Supervisor)

== Wireless networks ==
The Halton Regional Police Service operates a P25 dispatch network as well as an LTE broadband network. Since 2019 the LTE broadband network is shared with Peel Regional Police.
