= Black April =

Annual commemoration in overseas Vietnamese communities

Flag of the South Vietnamese government (June 14, 1949, to April 30, 1975)

Black April (Vietnamese: Tháng Tư đen) is a term used by Vietnamese diaspora communities who were refugees from the former South Vietnam to commemorate the Fall of Saigon on April 30, 1975, marking the end of the Vietnam War and the South Vietnamese government. Black April is a day for overseas Vietnamese to honor lives lost and reflect on the hardships caused by the war; many of them were displaced in the aftermath.

In Vietnam, April 30 is a public holiday referred to as Reunification Day, commemorating the end of the "War Against American Oppression" and the beginning of the reunification of South Vietnam and North Vietnam under communism.

== Background ==
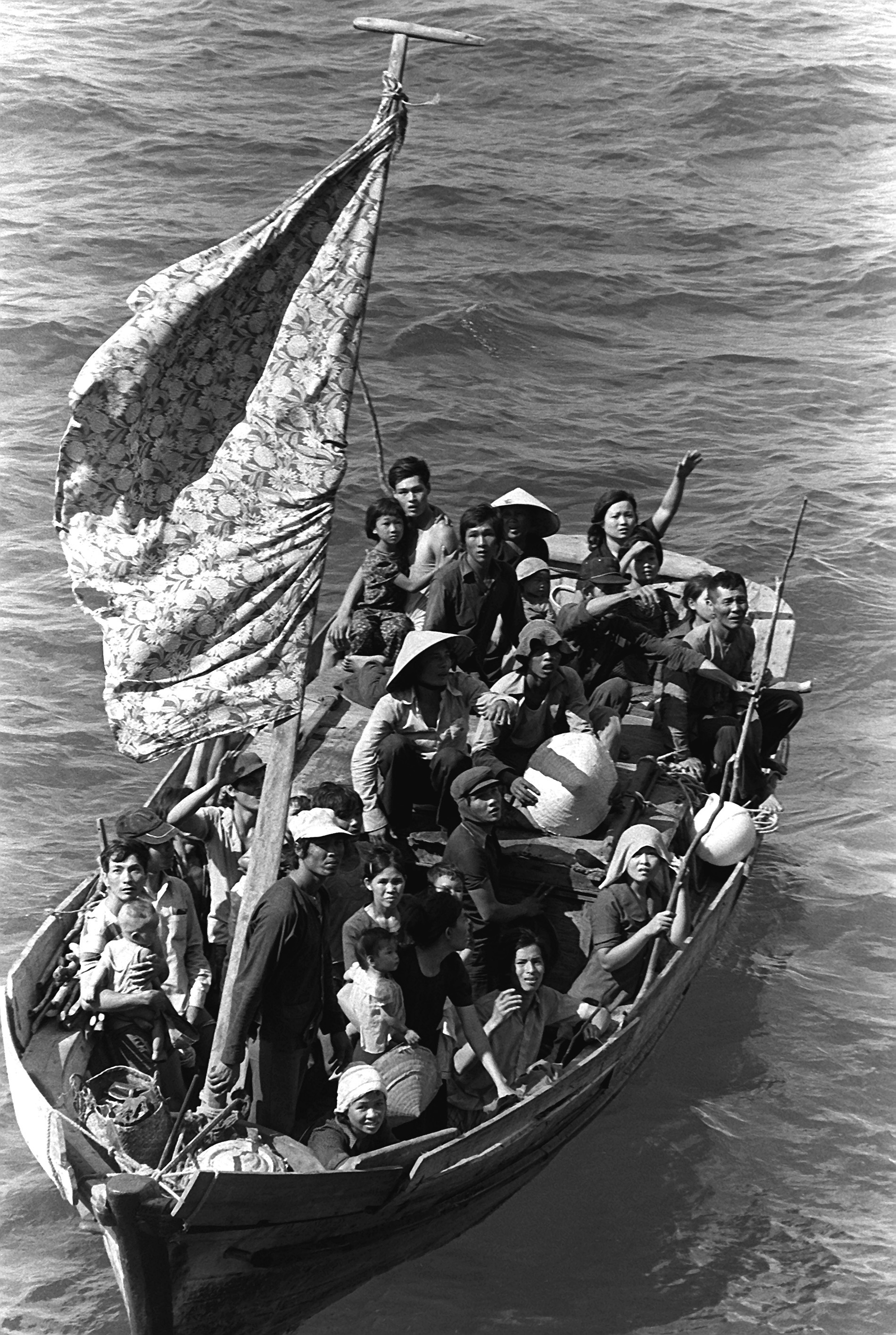
Vietnamese refugees fleeing Vietnam by boat

The Vietnam War was an armed conflict between North Vietnam, supported by the Soviet Union and China, and South Vietnam, supported by the United States, South Korea, Australia, and others. More than three million people were killed during the war and over half of the casualties were Vietnamese civilians. The Fall of Saigon marked the end of the war when Saigon, the capital of South Vietnam, was captured by North Vietnam on April 30, 1975. Saigon was later renamed Ho Chi Minh City.

In the days preceding the Fall of Saigon, the United States evacuated thousands of Americans, South Vietnamese and citizens of other nationalities, but many South Vietnamese were left behind. In the years that followed 1975, hundreds of thousands of South Vietnamese people fled Vietnam on boats and ships. Between 1975 and 1995, around 800,000 Southern Vietnamese refugees left Vietnam and arrived in a different country, but between 200,000 and 400,000 Southern Vietnamese refugees died at sea. This mass migration of South Vietnamese people to 50 countries worldwide is known as the Vietnamese diaspora. Currently, over six million Vietnamese people are living abroad in more than 130 countries; the largest community resides in California.

April 30 is a day of reflection and remembrance for overseas Vietnamese communities who experienced displacement and significant life changes following the end of the war. For Vietnamese citizens in Vietnam, it marks the reunification of the country and the start of a new era. This date holds different meanings depending on personal and historical perspectives.

== Commemoration ==
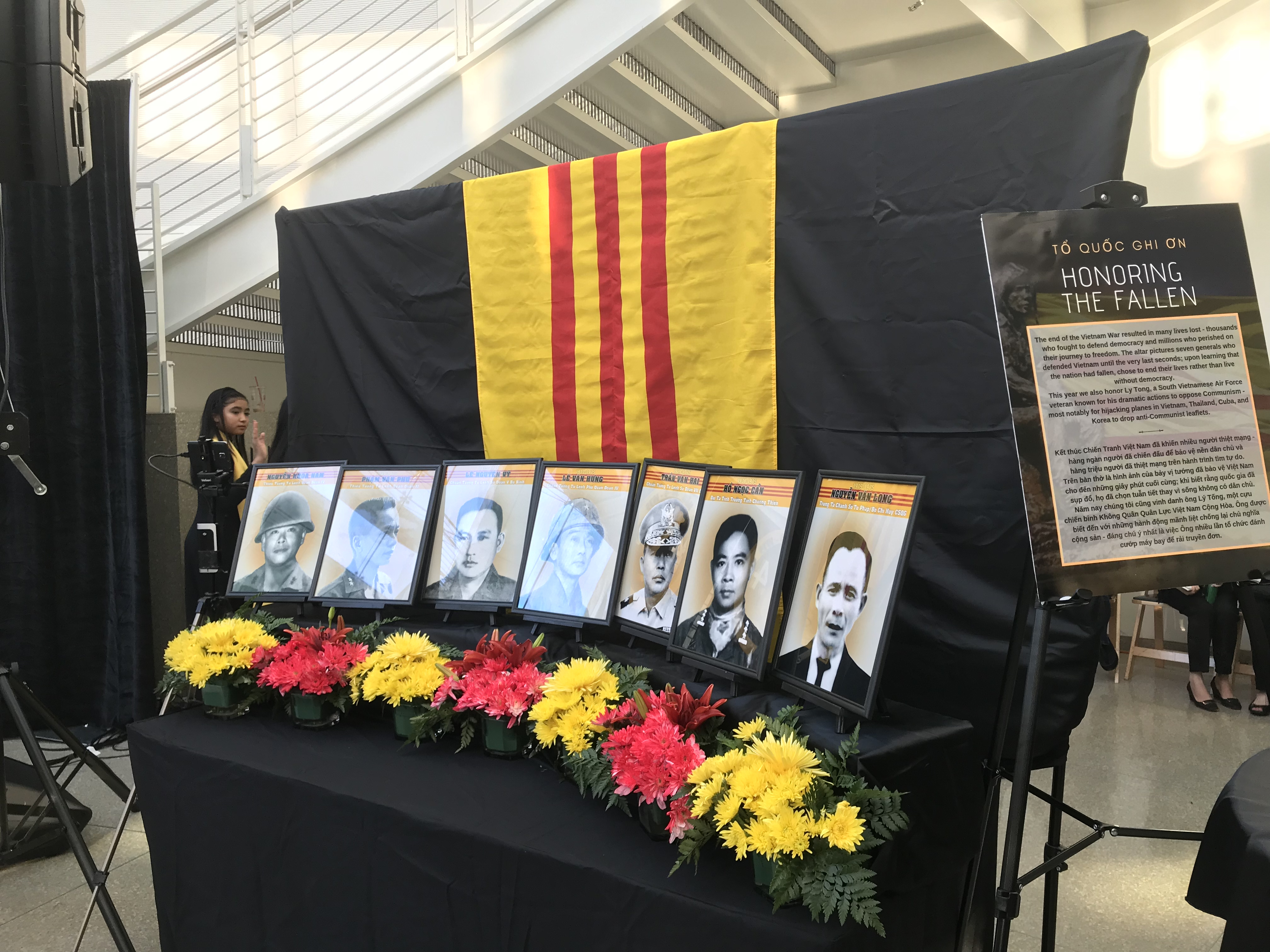
44th Black April Commemoration in San Jose

Every year, overseas Vietnamese communities gather on April 30 to remember and commemorate Black April. These events often feature gatherings at Vietnam War memorials, traditional áo dài attire, military uniforms, and speeches that honor those who lost their lives while sharing hopeful messages for future generations.

In Texas, Vietnamese families gather at a local church on April 30 to remember families and friends who were lost during the Vietnam War and the Fall of Saigon. Among those in attendance are former Southern Vietnamese Army veterans dressed in their military uniforms adorned with the South Vietnam flag sewn on their sleeves. The service includes the raising of the South Vietnam flag, serving as a heartfelt symbol of remembrance and unity for the Vietnamese community in Texas.

In Boston, members of the Massachusetts Vietnamese American community gathered on City Hall Plaza on April 30 to commemorate Black April, with many of the attendees wearing military uniforms. After maintaining this tradition for more than 20 years, the year 2024 marked the first time that Boston City Hall officially recognized the event and raised the South Vietnamese flag. The service included notable speakers such as Vinnie Bảo Toàn Than, the president of the Vietnamese-American Community of Massachusetts, and State Rep. Tram Nguyen, the first Vietnamese American woman elected in Massachusetts. A key purpose of this service is to educate the younger generation on the history of Black April and the origins of overseas Vietnamese communities. Also in attendance of this service are the co-founders of 1975: A Vietnamese Diaspora Commemoration, Ngọc-Trần Vũ and Linh-Phương Vũ, whose initiative is to record and maintain the oral history of first-hand accounts of the Vietnam War and Black April. Following the commemoration at City Hall Plaza in Boston, community members lay wreaths at the Vietnam Veterans Memorial in Boston to honor the veterans whose lives were lost during the Vietnam War.

In Fairfax County, Virginia, members of Voice of Vietnamese Americans hosted a Black April Commemoration on April 30 at the local Vietnam War Memorial. Among the attendees were leaders of local Vietnamese organizations, including Thang Nguyen, CEO & President of Boat People SOS in Falls Church, and Genie Nguyen, President and CEO of Voice of Vietnamese Americans. Both shared their personal stories as refugees and experiences fleeing Vietnam by boat. This gathering aims to honor their roots while inspiring younger Vietnamese Americans to contribute to building and strengthening the Vietnamese Community in Virginia.

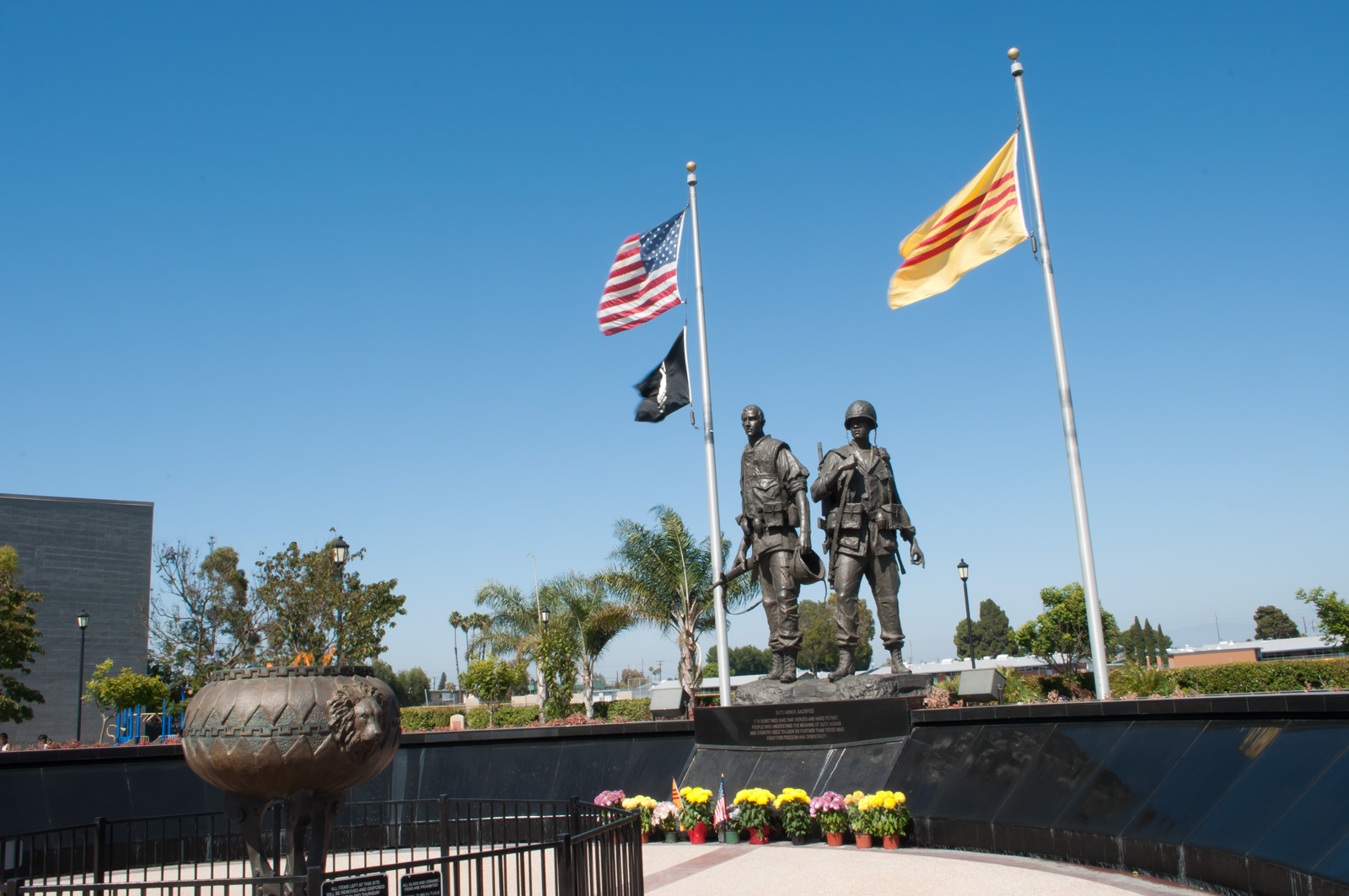
Vietnam War Memorial in Westminster, California

In Orange County, California, members of the Vietnamese community remember Black April by gathering at Sid Goldstein Freedom Park on April 30. Members of the community recited poems, prayers, and traditional songs, and laid wreaths at the memorial wall to honor those whose lives were lost during the Vietnam War and Black April. Many of these community members reside in Little Saigon, the largest diaspora community of Vietnamese people outside of Vietnam. Members in attendance wore military uniforms and áo dài. As of 2019, Westminster, California, became the first city globally to recognize Black April Memorial Week. Each year, the city of Westminster flies the South Vietnamese flag, which stands as a symbol of unity for the overseas Vietnamese communities, at half-staff at the Vietnamese-American War Memorial at Sid Goldstein Freedom Park from April 23 through April 30.

In South Australia, members of the Vietnamese community commemorate Black April by holding a Black April Commemoration - Vietnamese Remembrance Day on April 30. The ceremony had two parts. The first part was held at the Australian-Vietnamese War Memorial in Adelaide, South Australia, and involved military attire and wreath tributes to honor those who lost their lives. The second part of the ceremony included a musical program and candlelight vigil at the Vietnamese Community Hall in Athol Park, South Australia.

In remembrance of Black April, a Vietnam War Memorial was dedicated on April 27, 2003, at Sid Goldstein Freedom Park, Westminster, California. This memorial features an American and a South Vietnamese soldier standing side by side. Behind the soldiers are the United States and South Vietnam flags, and in the center of the monument is an eternal flame bronze urn.

== Controversies ==
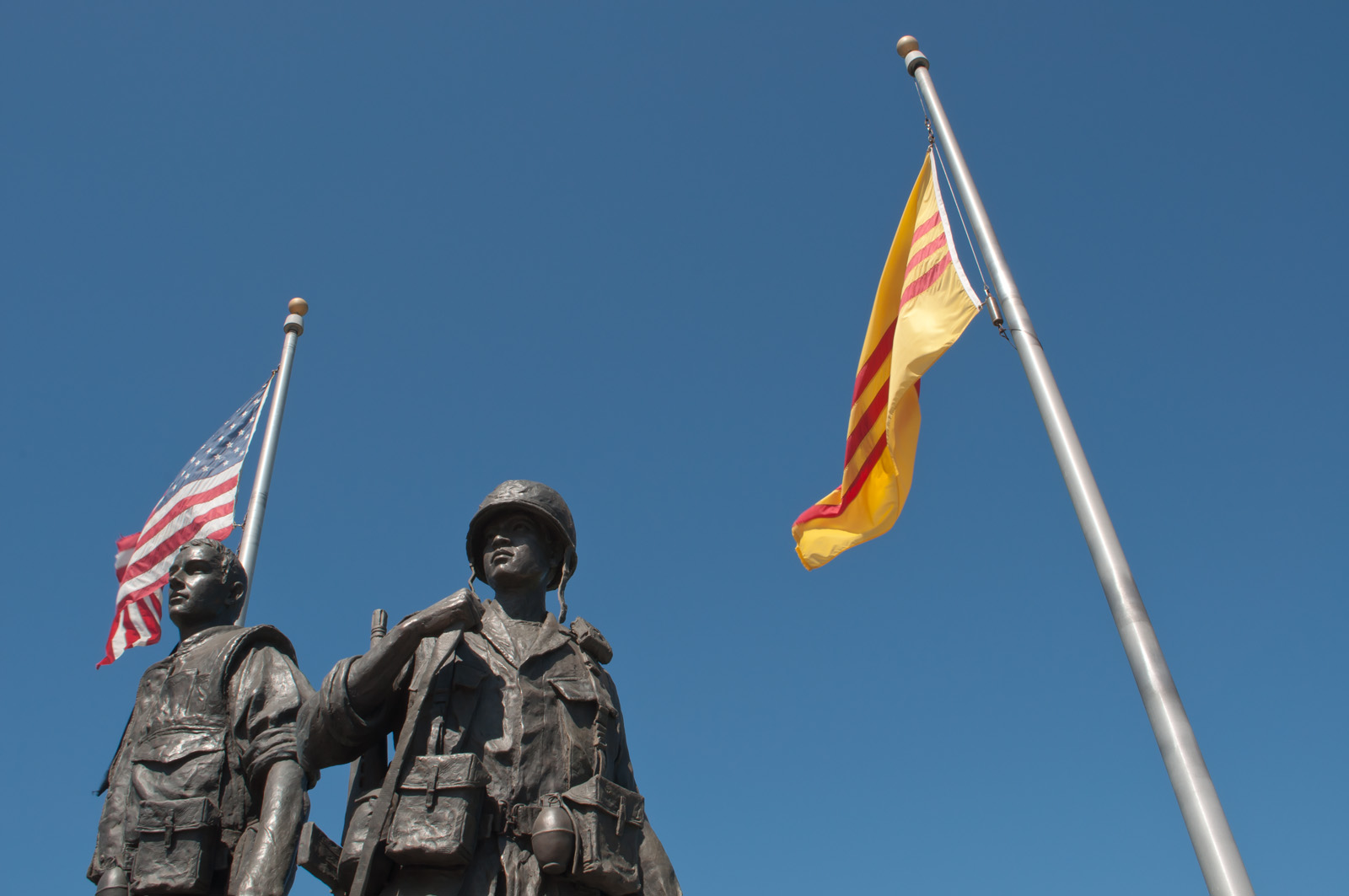
The Vietnam War Memorial is located in Westminster.

Before its dedication in 2003, the Vietnam War Memorial at Sid Goldstein Freedom Park in Westminster, California, was the subject of some controversy. In 1999, Consul General Phong Xuan Nguyen criticized the proposed memorial because of its depiction of a South Vietnamese soldier standing next to an American soldier. According to Nguyen, this depiction of a South Vietnamese soldier would bring back a bitter past that both sides have decided to leave behind. Nguyen suggested that the proposed memorial should replace the South Vietnamese soldier with a North Vietnamese. According to Nguyen, including a North Vietnamese soldier would more accurately represent the current relationship between the United States and Vietnam. Nguyen's requests were ultimately not accepted. The memorial stands as a gathering place for Vietnamese community members to remember Black April.

In 2021, Westminster's Mayor Tri Ta, the first Vietnamese-American mayor in the United States, proposed plans to build another Vietnam War memorial in Westminster. This new memorial would commemorate a Vietnam War battle called Mùa Hè Đỏ Lửa or the Red Fiery Summer, which culminated in the South Vietnamese troops defeating the Northern Vietnamese troops at the Citadel of Quang Tri. This battle stood as a symbol of hope that South Vietnam could win battles without much involvement from the U.S. troops. Mayor Tri Ta and some City Council members wanted to memorialize this battle by building a memorial called the Quang Tri Monument in Westminster. This plan was met with some backlash from local organization leaders because it would dilute the existing memorial at Sid Goldstein Freedom Park. These leaders argued that building more monuments would take away from the essence of the original memorial. On January 27, 2023, the Westminster City Council voted 3–2 to terminate the controversial plans for the Quang Tri Monument.

Viet Thanh Nguyen is a prominent figure in the Vietnamese American community, renowned for his literary and academic contributions. In 2016, he won the Pulitzer Prize for Fiction for his novel The Sympathizer. Nguyen is also a university professor and the Aerol Arnold Chair of English at the University of Southern California, where he also serves as a professor of English, American Studies and Ethnicity, and Comparative Literature. In 2016, Nguyen wrote in a blog about his views on "Black April" that can be considered controversial by some in the Vietnamese Diaspora Community. Nguyen said that while he acknowledges the trauma and loss experienced by the overseas Vietnamese community, including his own family's separation and displacement, he also challenges the singular narrative of mourning. He notes that for some Vietnamese people, the Fall of Saigon represents not loss but liberation and celebration. He explains, "I needed to acknowledge that pain, to understand it, but in order to live beyond it, I also needed to acknowledge that the pain of others, the worldview of others. This is why I cannot say 'Black April,' because it is one story of one side, and I am interested in all stories of all sides." Nguyen's comments reflect his commitment to exploring the complex and multifaceted meanings that April 30 holds for different Vietnamese communities.

== See also ==
- Reunification Day
- Fall of Saigon
- Overseas Vietnamese
- South Vietnam
- Vietnam War
- Vietnamese boat people
