= Eliza Weaver Bradburn =

- Born: 1793; Birmingham
- Died: March 8, 1878; Brighton
- Occupation: Writer
- Parents: Samuel Bradburn (father); Sophia Bradburn (mother)

Eliza Weaver Bradburn (1793–1878) was a British Methodist writer, largely of works for children.

Eliza Weaver Bradburn was born in Birmingham in 1793. She was the daughter of the Methodist preacher Samuel Bradburn and Sophia Cooke Bradburn, an early supporter of Sunday school education.

Bradburn's earliest work was about her father's career: a preface to an 1817 collection of his sermons and a biography, Memoirs of the Late Rev. Samuel Bradburn (1816). She wrote two adaptations of works from the British literary canon for children, versions of Edmund Spenser's The Faerie Queene and John Milton's Paradise Lost. Her Pity Poor Africa (1831), an early abolitionist work for children, was the first work featuring a mother explaining slavery to her children. She was also editor of the Methodist publication Youth's Instructor.

Bradburn died in Brighton on 8 March 1878.

== Bibliography ==
- Memoirs of the Late Rev. Samuel Bradburn. London: Richard Edwards, 1816.
- The Story of Paradise Lost for Children. London, John Mason, 1828.
- Legends from Spenser's Fairy Queen, For Children. London, John Mason, 1829.
- Pity Poor Africa: A Dialogue for Children in Three Parts. 2nd ed. London: John Mason, 1831.
- Our Centenary, a Centenary Poem for Children. London, 1839.
- The Endless Story in Rhyme. London, 1843.
- Stories of the Charitable Children. New York: Carlton & Phillips, 1853.
- Rosa: or, The Two Castles. 1 vol. London: Partridge, 1863.
