= Kingston Police Force =

Police agency serving Kingston, Ontario, Canada

Kingston Police Service De Police De Kingston
- Badge worn by Kingston Police Officers.
- Common name: Kingston Police
- Abbreviation: KPF
- Motto: "Ontario's Finest" "Serving Our Community"

Agency overview
- Formed: December 20, 1841; 184 years ago
- Annual budget: $44,366,789 Million CAD (2023)

Jurisdictional structure
- Operations jurisdiction: Municipality of the City of Kingston
- Area: 451.58 square kilometres (174.36 sq mi)
- Population: 132,485 (2021)
- Legal jurisdiction: Municipal
- Governing body: Kingston Police Services Board
- General nature: Local civilian police

Operational structure
- Headquarters: 705 Division Street, Kingston Ontario Canada
- Sworn Officers: 219 (2023)
- Civilian Employees: 98 (2023)
- Elected officer responsible: Michael Kerzner, Minister of the Solicitor General
- Agency executive: Adam MacIntosh, Chief of Police
- Boroughs: 7: Old Kingston; Pittsburgh; Westbrook; Cataraqui Woods; Rideau Heights; Sunnyside; Hillendale

Facilities
- Police Stations: 1 (The Kingston Police Headquarters)
- Police Vehicles: 120+
- Dogs: 2

Website
- www.kingstonpolice.ca

The Kingston Police is the municipal police force for the city of Kingston, Ontario, Canada. It was established by the Common Council of Kingston on December 20, 1841, making it one of the oldest police forces in Canada. Today, the Kingston Police is made up of approximately 300 members serving an area of 451.58 square kilometers and 132,485 (2021 Census) people.

== History ==
The Kingston Police Force was established by the Common Council of Kingston on December 20, 1841, in an attempt to manage the lawlessness in the capital of the former Province of Canada. The original police force comprised a Chief Constable and four sub-constables. Despite their best effort, the force's growth was limited due to monetary restraints. In the 1850s, they were composed of about 8-10 officers growing to about a dozen in the 1860s, where it remained until the early 20th century.

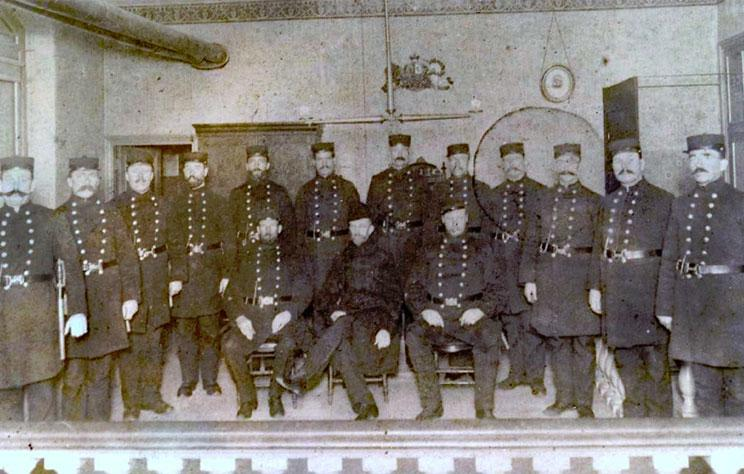
Kingston Police Force c. 1906

Following World War II, the force finally began growing at a more consistent rate. In 1990 they had expanded to 116 sworn officers serving a population of over 60,000 inhabitants. The 1990s were a tough decade for the Kingston Police Force. In 1993, the Social Contract Act was put in place by the government in an attempt to address budget deficits. This resulted in a major loss in funding, ultimately leading to the reduction of the force to 101 officers. In 1996, the province introduced additional cost-saving initiatives such as the Savings and Restructuring Act, which merged smaller municipalities with their neighbours. In 1998, both the Kingston Township and the Pittsburgh Township were merged into Kingston City, nearly doubling its population. During this transitional period, the Ontario Provincial Police assisted the KPF in managing its population, however, by the end of the decade, the Kingston Police having now grown to nearly 150 sworn officers, re-claimed full control over their newly expanded jurisdiction. By 2011 the force had grown to 198 officers and 60 civilian employees.

== Divisions ==
The Kingston Police currently has four separate divisions each responsible for a separate area of policing.

=== Patrol and Communications ===
Patrol Platoons work 12 hour shifts, with 2 day shifts, followed by 2 night shifts, and then 4 days off. 911 Communication Unit staffs are assigned to platoons.

- A Platoon
- B Platoon
- C Platoon
- D Platoon
- 911 Communications Unit
- Community Outreach and Support Team
- Mobile Crisis Rapid Response Team
- Special Constables

=== Investigative Services ===
The Investigative Services is split into Criminal Investigations and Special Services

Source: Criminal Investigations

- Forensic Identification Unit
- E-Crimes/Disclosure
- Major Case Management
- General Investigations Unit
- Major Crime Unit
- Fraud Unit
- Vulnerable Sector Unit
- Sexual Assault and Child Abuse Unit
- Internet Child Exploitation Unit

Special Services

- Intelligence Unit
- Drug Enforcement Unit
- Street Crime Unit
- Technical Investigations
- Dangerous Offender
- Joint Forces Penitentiary Squad (Pen Squad)
- Provincial Weapons Enforcement Unit (PWEU)
- Repeat Offender Parole Enforcement (ROPE)
- Guns and Gangs Joint Forces Operation
- Joint Forces Operation Bikers Enforcement Unit (BEU)
- High-Risk Sex-Offender Manager

=== Operational Support ===
Professional Standards

- Quality Assurance and Audit
- Legal

Community Oriented Response and Engagement (CORE)

- Beat and Bicycle Officers
- Community Operations
- School Resource Officers
- Police Liaison Teams
- Media Relations Office
- Community Volunteers
- Traffic Safety Unit (Part of CORE Unit)
- Police Motorcycle Unit
- Drone/Aerial Support Unit
- Collision Reconstruction Unit

=== Administrative Support ===
- Facility/Fleet Services
- Training Unit
- Emergency Response Unit (ERU)
- Canine Unit (K9)
- Alternate Response Unit
- Cellblock Monitors
- Court Services
- Bail Safety
- Front Desk and Records Unit
- Property and Stores

== Former Chiefs ==
Name	Start of term	End of term	Notes
Scott Fraser	Jan. 31, 2024	Jan. 1, 2026	Fraser began his policing career in 1991 and served the Brockville Police Service for 23 years in a variety of roles. As a recipient of the Police Exemplary Service Medal, Fraser is a well-respected and hard-working member of his community. He began working for the Kingston Police in 2021 as the Deputy Chief but was quickly appointed Acting Chief of Police in January 2023. About a year later Scott Fraser was sworn in as the Chief of Police of the Kingston Police Force.
Antje McNeely	November, 2018	January, 2023	Hired in April 1985, McNeely holds the distinction of being the first female officer to hold the ranks of staff sergeant (December 2001), inspector (January 2007), Deputy Chief (July 2011), and Chief of Police (November 2018).
Gilles M. Larochelle	June, 2013	July, 2018	Prior to his position as Chief of Police, Larochelle had over a decade of extensive experience within the senior command structure in the Ottawa Police Service. He served as an inspector, superintendent, and deputy chief in various assignments.
Stephen J. Tanner	November, 2008	September, 2012	Tanner held various policing positions within the province, including Deputy Chief of Operations with the Guelph Police Service, Chief of Police in Belleville, ON, President of the 2012/13 Ontario Association of Chiefs of Police, and Chief of Police in Kingston.
William J. Closs	August, 1995	2008	Reached a commemorable rank of Chief Superintendent with the Ontario Provincial Police before serving as the Chief of Police in Kingston.
William R. Hackett	1994	1995	Hackett joined the Kingston Police in 1951, and served for 44 years until his retirement in 1995. He holds the lengthiest recorded service within the Kingston police ever. A city park was named in his honour.
Gerald S. Rice	1976	1994	Died of a heart attack one month before his retirement.
Roland R. Smith	1974	1976	Died in office.
Robert W. Nesbitt	1959	1974	He was the grandson of Robert Nesbitt who served as Chief of police in 1918.
John T. Truaisch	January, 1947	October, 1959	Truaisch served as the 1955/56 President of the Ontario Association of Chiefs of Police; he died in office.
Captain Robert J. Robinson	October, 1919	December, 1946	Robinson was appointed for 27 years, making him the longest serving Chief of Police in Kingston.
Robert Nesbitt	December, 1918	1919	Nesbitt is alleged to have served as an officer in Liverpool for several years prior to immigration to Canada. He died in office after serving in Kingston for over 42 years.
William Baillie	May, 1899	December, 1918	
Captain Edwin Horsey	1881	April, 1899	
Colonel S. B. Hance	November, 1874	1881	An American who was appointed, despite much protest from locals.
John Robb	September, 1870	October, 1874	Died in office.
Robert Channonhouse	1849	1870	Previously a counsellor for the Ward of Ontario.
Samuel Shaw	December, 1841	March, 1849	Before becoming chief, Shaw was the High Bailiff.

== Ranks and insignia ==
The rank insignia of the Kingston Police Force is similar to that used by some police services elsewhere in Canada and in the United Kingdom, except that the usual "pips" are replaced by maple leaves. The St. Edward's Crown is found on insignia of staff sergeant, all superintendent ranks and all commanding officer ranks.

Rank	Commanding Officers		Senior Officers				Police Officers	
Rank	Chief of police	Deputy chief of police	Staff Inspector	Inspector	Staff sergeant	Sergeant	Senior police constable	Constable
Insignia (slip-on)								
Insignia (shoulder board)					Shoulder boards not used for these ranks			

== Weapons ==
The Kingston Police uses the following weapons:

- Glock-17 Pistol
- C8 Carbine
- OC Spray
- Taser X7
- Collapsible Baton
