= Lenna Bradburn =

Canadian executive in the public sector

- Born: Toronto, Ontario, Canada
- Education: University of Toronto
- Occupations: health care executive, former Guelph police chief
- Spouse: Gord Loukes

Lenna Bradburn (born 1960) is a Canadian executive in the public sector. She served as Canada's first female police chief from 1994 to 2000.

She was born in Toronto, Ontario, growing up in Scarborough. In 1982, she received a bachelor's degree in criminology and sociology from Victoria College at the University of Toronto. She joined the Metropolitan Toronto Police Service in 1981. Bradburn served as Corporate Secretary for the Toronto Police Association. In 1990, she earned a Master of Public Administration from Queen's University. In 1991, she became a Police Services Advisor for the Ontario Ministry of the Solicitor General and Correctional Services. She was hired by the Guelph Police Service in 1994, serving for six years. She subsequently held executive positions at Ombudsman Ontario, the City of Toronto and the Ontario Lottery & Gaming Corporation. In January 2014, Bradburn became vice president for Resident and Community Services at Toronto Community Housing. In August 2015, it was announced that she was leaving for an executive position in health care.

Bradburn married Gord Loukes.

She was named one of Canada's "Top 40 Under 40" by the Financial Post in 1997.
