= Samuel Bradburn =

Methodist preacher

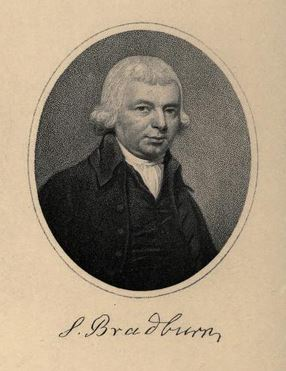

President of the Methodist Conference
- In office 1799–1800
- Preceded by: Joseph Benson
- Succeeded by: James Wood

Personal details
- Born: 1751 Gibraltar
- Died: 26 July 1816 (aged 64–65)
- Spouse: Sophia Cooke Bradburn
- Children: Eliza Weaver Bradburn
- Occupation: Methodist preacher
- Known for: oratory

Samuel Bradburn (1751–1816), was a Methodist preacher. He was an associate of John Wesley, and an intimate disciple of Fletcher of Madeley.

He was the son of a private in the army, and was born at Gibraltar.

On his father's return to England, when he was about twelve years old, he was apprenticed to a cobbler at Chester, and after a course of youthful profligacy became a Methodist at the age of eighteen. Bradburn entered the itinerant ministry about three years later in 1774, and continued in it more than forty years till his death.

Bradburn was a successful orator, described as having a commanding figure and voice.

Bradburn was described as having a simple lifestyle and a reputation for generosity and eccentricity. Although he was once a well-known preacher, little of his work remains apart from a published volume containing a small number of sermons issued posthumously.

Bradburn was president of the Methodist conference in 1799. He died on 26 July 1816 following several months of inability to preach.
