= Bradburn, Manitoba =

Coordinates: 49°36′00″N 98°04′00″W

Bradburn is a ghost town in the Rural Municipality of Dufferin, Manitoba, Canada near the town of Carman. Founded in 1906, it was a stop on the Midland Railway. The town died after the railway closed and the tracks were taken up, in 1926.
