= Stephen Tanner =

American author

- Born: Stephen Tanner
- Occupation: Historian
- Writing career
- Genre: Non-fiction
- Subject: military

Stephen Tanner is an American author currently residing in Sierra Madre, California.

As a military historian and freelance writer, Tanner has produced the following books:

- Afghanistan - A Military History from Alexander the Great to the War Against the Taliban (2002) According to WorldCat, the book is held in 1970 libraries Reviewed in Times Literary Supplement
  - Translated into Russian as Афганистан : история войн от Александра Македонского до падения "Талибана"
- Epic Retreats: From 1776 to the Evacuation of Saigon;
- Refuge from the Reich: American Airmen and Switzerland during World War II (2000) According to WorldCat, held in 689 libraries. Reviewed in Journal of Military History.
- The wars of the Bushes : a father and son as military leaders.(2004) According to WorldCat, held in 450 libraries.
  - Translated into Polish as Wojny Bushów : ojciec i syn jako zwierzchnicy sił zbrojnych
  - Translated into Chinese as 父子统帅：布什们的战争/父子統帥：布什們的戰爭, fù zǐ tǒng shuài: bù shí mén dí zhàn zhēng
  - Translated into Turkish as Bush'ların savaşları : askeri liderler olarak bir baba ve oğlun portresi
- (with Samuel A Southworth) U.S. special forces : a guide to America's special operations units : the world's most elite fighting force (2002) Held in 308 libraries.
