= Guelph Police Service =

Police agency serving Guelph, Ontario, Canada

- Motto: Pride, Service, Trust

Agency overview
- Formed: 1827

Operational structure
- Headquarters: Guelph, Ontario
- Sworn members: 223
- Unsworn members: 108
- Elected officer responsible: The Honourable Michael Kerzner, Solicitor General of Ontario
- Agency executive: Gordon Cobey, Chief of Police

Website
- Official website

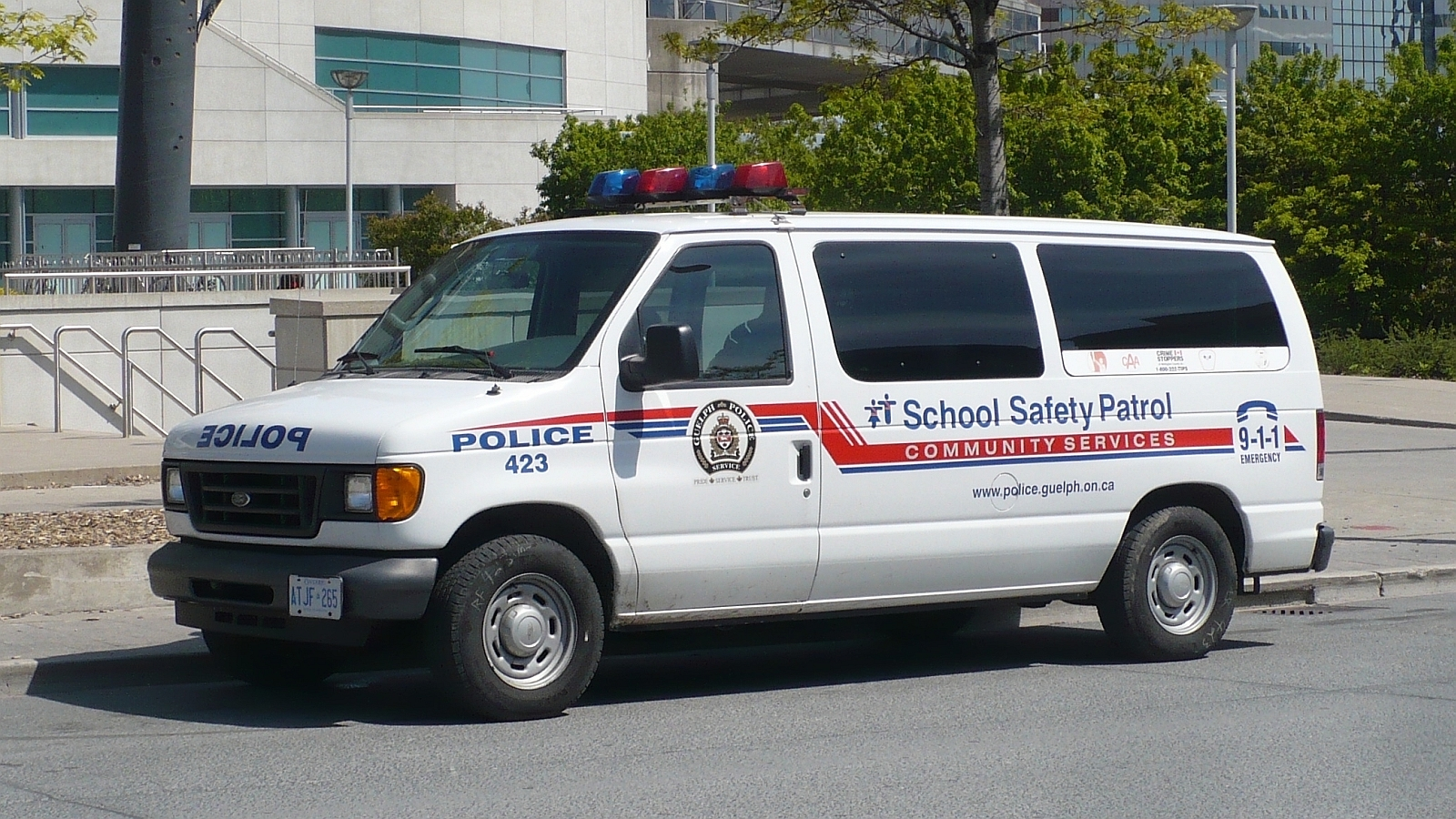
School safety patrol vehicle of the community services unit

The Guelph Police Service (GPS) is the police force for the city of Guelph, Ontario. The GPS was formed in 1827 with the founding of the city. The Guelph Police Service is the 14th largest municipal police service in Ontario with 331 members and serves a population of around 150,000. The Chief of Police is Gordon Cobey and the departmental headquarters are located at 15 Wyndham Street South. The force is governed by the Ontario Police Services Act, under which a five-member civilian "police services board" is responsible for the Guelph Police.

== Administration ==
223 sworn police officers and 108 civilian employees make up the Guelph Police Service (2022 report). Each officer must contain several prerequisites and complete a series of application stages in order to reach employment. As of January 2020, there is a new first step in being able to apply for policing in Ontario. Hopeful applicants must complete their OACP testing and receive a certificate in order to be able to apply.

The staff of a police service includes various positions and units. Police constable is a position where officers develop relationships through community interaction. Through law enforcement and crime prevention, this position allows officers to ensure public safety. Constable is not the only position, or the only way for the residents of the Guelph region, to fight crime. Several civilian openings are given each year, such as managerial and supportive positions. These job opportunities require specialized skills and knowledge in order to adjust to the ever-changing front-line setting.

The service annually awards valuable contributions with the title of "Member of the Year", "Award for Excellence in Support Services", "Award for Excellence in Criminal Investigation", and "Chief's Commendation for Policing Excellence".

== Inquiries and service ==
In order to perform with efficiency, multiple services have been instituted. Court services, for example, is a unit responsible for maintaining a safe environment for all persons inside a courtroom. The Municipal Freedom of Information and Protection of Privacy Act (MFIPPA) allows all Ontario residents to request information from all police services. This right also necessitates these police services to protect all information including administrative documents and personal intelligence of all Ontario's inhabitants.

== GPS branches ==
- Critical incident response team (CIRT)
- Downtown/tactical team
- Downtown liaison
- Neighbourhood teams
- Canine
- Traffic
- Strike liaison
- Civil emergencies
- Bike patrol
- Crime analyst
- Criminal investigations
- Drugs and intelligence
- Forensic identification
- Communications
- Community relations
- Training

== Fleet ==
- (Soon to be retired) Ford Taurus police interceptor cruisers (marked and unmarked)
- Ford Explorer hybrid police interceptor cruisers (marked and unmarked)
- Mobile command unit - converted RV

=== Past vehicles ===
- Ford Crown Victoria LTD cruiser
- Chevrolet Caprice cruiser
- Chevrolet Impala cruiser
