= NBPC =

NBPC may refer to:

- National Basketball Performance Centre, a sports centre in Manchester, England
- National Black Playwrights Conference, a conference held in Canberra, Australia, in 1987
- National Border Patrol Council, an American labour union
- Provincial Court of New Brunswick, the lower trial court of the Canadian province of New Brunswick
