= 2018 Fredericton shooting =

Shooting in Fredericton, Canada

Fredericton shooting
- Location of the shootings in New Brunswick
- Location: 45°59′15.7452″N 66°39′14.994″W; 237 Brookside Drive, Fredericton, New Brunswick, Canada
- Date: 10 August 2018 c. 07:00 – c. 9:30 (UTC−03:00)
- Attack type: Mass shooting
- Weapons: SKS; Canuck Regulator
- Deaths: 4
- Injuries: 1 (the perpetrator)
- Perpetrator: Matthew Vincent Raymond

The Fredericton shooting was a mass shooting that occurred in Fredericton, New Brunswick, Canada, on the morning of 10 August 2018, in which four people, including two police officers, were killed. The shooter, Matthew Raymond, was found not criminally responsible in 2020.

== Shooting ==
On 10 August 2018, around 7:00 a.m. ADT, multiple witnesses reported dozens of shots being fired on Brookside Drive between Main Street and Ring Road in a residential neighbourhood on the north side of the city of Fredericton. At 7:10 a.m., Fredericton Police officers Lawrence Robert Costello and Sara Burns responded to calls of shots being fired outside of an apartment building. They arrived to the scene of two people on the ground and were fatally shot upon approaching them. The area was locked down by Fredericton Police, who told residents to stay in their homes. At 8:17, police said they were investigating a shooting with multiple fatalities, and asked people to avoid the area. The two deceased officers were reportedly the first responding officers to the scene. Gunfire was exchanged between the suspect and police.

Around 9:00, an apartment building located at 237 Brookside Drive was evacuated. A resident of the building told reporters that he awoke to gunshots around 8:30, looked out his window and saw three bodies. Officers stated around 9:30, they entered an apartment and arrested the suspect.

Around 11:00, local police said that there was no further threat to the public and the lockdown was lifted. Police said that the area would be contained for the "foreseeable future" due to the ongoing investigation.

== Victims ==
A call went out to the deputy police chief informing him that two officers had been shot after responding to a call. At 10:28 ADT, Fredericton Police said two of the four dead were police officers. Dr. Everett Chalmers Regional Hospital reported it was treating multiple victims. On 11 August, the hospital clarified that it had received only the four fatalities and the injured shooter.

The two officers killed were 45-year-old Lawrence Robert Costello and 43-year-old Sara Burns, both constables. Police have identified two dead civilians as musician Donald Adam Robichaud, 42, and his girlfriend, Bobbie-Lee Wright, 32.

== Accused ==
Police said they shot and arrested the suspect, a 48-year-old Matthew Vincent Raymond of Fredericton, who sustained serious injuries. Multiple media sources have reported he was known for being "ignorant" and "Islamophobic." Others, notably the office manager for the apartment complex, described him as "polite" and "pleasant." The suspect was charged with four counts of first degree murder. His trial began September 15, 2020. He was later found not criminally responsible. Raymond is currently held at the Restigouche Hospital Centre.

== Investigation ==
The West District detachment of the Royal Canadian Mounted Police Major Crimes Division and Fredericton Police conducted an investigation into the shooting. Reporters at the scene were asked to provide any pertinent information to investigators. In the immediate aftermath, police were quoted as saying they were "at the early stages of a very significant event," and a spokesperson for Minister of Public Safety and Emergency Preparedness Ralph Goodale stated that, as it was a "developing situation," it would be "premature to determine whether there are any national security implications."

Fredericton Police also asked that any civilian witnesses make available whatever documentation they may have had of the incident in order to aid in the investigation.

The gunman is said to have fired onto people from an elevated position using a long gun.

A publication ban on the details of the shooting was lifted on August 17.

== Reactions ==
Canadian Prime Minister Justin Trudeau and Minister of Public Safety and Emergency Preparedness Ralph Goodale tweeted messages of support. New Brunswick Premier Brian Gallant and Fredericton Mayor Mike O'Brien shared their condolences for the victims and their families.

Police forces from across Canada also sent messages of solidarity and support on social media. Some residents of the area likened the incident to the 2014 Moncton shooting, and one said, "Immediately, I thought of Justin Bourque. Obviously, we have no way of knowing at this time what the situation is, but there seems to be the same level of worry and fear."

=== Tributes ===
A memorial vigil was held on 10 August, at St. John the Evangelist Anglican Church, and a makeshift memorial for the victims was created outside the Fredericton Police Station. Fundraisers for the victims, were established through GoFundMe although initially neither the officers families nor the Fredericton Police had sanctioned any fundraisers on the website.

A local boy recorded a cover of Leonard Cohen's Hallelujah with some of the lyrics changed to focus on the two deceased officers. The initial video was viewed by over 400,000 times by 13 August, and he was invited to perform it live at one of the vigils for the victims.

On 18 August, the two officers were given a regimental funeral. It was attended by hundreds of police officers from around the country, as well as friends and families of the victims. On July 28, 2026 Fredericton’s Mayor and Council, along with members of the Fredericton Police Force and first responders, gathered for a moment of silence Monday night as Guardian, a memorial to those who serve and protect the public, was commissioned and officially illuminated.

Guardian is a beacon of light illuminating a 19th Century granite Carleton Street Bridge Pier in the middle of the Wolastoq (Saint John River). Public viewing areas, including signage with granite benches, have been established on both sides of the river. The light will appear every night at sunset and recede at dawn.

Mayor Steve Hicks commented that “Guardian serves to remind us that Fredericton’s community is strong, connected and resilient … It honours the commitment of police and all first responders to keep us safe every day and night.”

The idea for Guardian was conceived after a period of community reflection and recovery following the tragic events of August 10, 2018, when four individuals, including two police officers, lost their lives.

== See also ==
- 2018 Toronto shooting
- David Wynn
- 2014 Moncton shooting
