= Anne Dugas-Horsman =

Anne Dugas-Horsman is a judge on the Provincial Court of New Brunswick.

== Biography ==
Dugas-Horsman was created a Justice of the Provincial Court of New Brunswick in 2001. She had been a practicing lawyer at the office of Fowler and Fowler in Moncton until then, and had presided over the Moncton CPP review tribunal. In 2002, Dugas-Horsman was awarded the Queen Elizabeth II Golden Jubilee Medal. On 12 May 2016, Dugas-Horsman was appointed to the Judicial Complaints Panel of Newfoundland for a three-year term.

== Notable cases ==
Dugas-Horsman had presided over the following cases:

- A PEI man forfeited his car and received one day in jail (after spending 75 days in pre-trial custody) for several cases of shoplifting, in the first case ever of asset forfeiture in the Moncton area.
- Dugas-Horsman refused to bypass a preliminary hearing in a case where the suspect of a 1995 Sackville double homicide planned to plead not guilty. The suspect had been serving time in British Columbia's penal system for a series of robberies prior to the trial date in June 2010.
- For millions of images of child pornography, then the largest stash ever discovered in Canada, a 52-year-old man received a sentence of five years.
- Scalding a toddler in a bathtub earned a young man who had pleaded guilty to criminal negligence causing bodily harm a four-year term of imprisonment.
- A 24-year-old man, who had known Justin Bourque for 14 years, had his bail hearing delayed for a number of days while his psyche was assessed, in a case of uttering a threat to cause death to an ideational police officer, in a phone conversation with an acquaintance which was overheard by fellow shoppers at a farmer's market. Several months later, he was convicted and handed a nine-month conditional sentence.
- In October 2014, a 28 year old Moncton woman pleaded guilty to aggravated assault and was sentenced to 30 months for stabbing while drunk her boyfriend in the head after he had not heeded her requests to be left alone.
- A 47 year old drug baron who trafficked cocaine and hydromorphone in New Brunswick and PEI obtained in April 2016 seven years for his troubles; in addition his home in Grand-Barachois was confiscated by the court. The fact that the drug baron had previously been molested by Karl Toft at the New Brunswick Training School earned him little sympathy.
- The Courts in St Stephen and Grand Manan were closed on 1 November 2015, in favour of the Court at Saint John. In October 2016 Dugas-Horsman heard arguments from affected residents of south-eastern New Brunswick over the Charter, which guarantees under Section 7 the right to equal access to justice, and which (they felt) had been violated by the closures due to Provincial government cutbacks. On 24 May 2017, Dugas-Horsman ruled that:

There is, in my view, a further obstacle to the defendants' claim and that is the fact that economic rights, perse, have never been recognized by the courts as a right requiring the protection of Section 7 or falling under the purview of Section 7.

The reporter goes on to state that, "for Campobello Island residents there is a 70 to 80 minute trip to St Stephen, where they have to clear Customs and Immigration, before heading to Saint John, which is an additional 90 minute journey. For Grand Manan residents (who previously had a circuit court on the island) there is a 90 minute ferry ride, plus waiting at least 45 minutes in the parking area prior to departure. It then takes approximately 15 minutes to unload the vehicles, before an approximately one hour's drive to Saint John. In order to attend court in Saint John, depending on weather conditions, and ferry scheduling, it becomes necessary to travel to the city the day before requiring a night's lodging."
