= Les Jackson =

Les Jackson may refer to:

- Les Jackson (cricketer) (1921–2007), English cricketer
- Leslie Douglas Jackson (1917–1980), Australian fighter ace
- Les Jackson (ice hockey) (born 1952), Canadian ice hockey player
- R. Leslie Jackson, Chief Justice of the Provincial Court of New Brunswick

== See also ==
- Lesley Jackson, English design curator, historian and author
