= Peter Zaduk =

Canadian defence attorney

Michael Peter Zaduk is a prominent Canadian defence attorney, who has practised in Toronto for more than 17 years, specialising in major narcotics and violence-related crimes.

In his years as a defence attorney, Zaduk has represented dozens of people accused of cultivating marijuana, and accused Deputy Prime Minister Anne McLellan of "[not living] in the real world" and being misleading and incorrect, in attributing marijuana cultivation with the shooting deaths of four RCMP officers in 2005.

In 2002 he withdrew from the Law Society of British Columbia.

From 2005 to 2007, he was working with the International Criminal Tribunal for Rwanda to defend former President Pasteur Bizimungu.
