= David Smith (justice) =

Canadian jurist

David Duncan Smith KC (born March 20, 1944) is a retired Canadian jurist who served as Chief Justice of the Court of Queen's Bench of New Brunswick.

== Biography ==
A graduate of Acadia University with a Bachelor of Commerce and the University of New Brunswick with an LL.B., Smith was called to the New Brunswick Bar in 1971 and appointed Queen's Counsel in 1985.

Smith was appointed to the family division of the Court of Queen's Bench of New Brunswick in 1993, and was elevated to be the chief justice of the court in 1998. He reached his mandatory retirement age in 2019.

He is a former member of the New Brunswick Parole Board and has held leadership positions in the New Brunswick branch of the Canadian Bar Association, the Moncton YMCA, the Moncton Airport Board, the Rotary Club and United Way. He is a former director of Canadair Limited and Junior Achievement.

== Notable cases ==
=== Prosecution of Moncton shooter ===
Smith presided over the 2014 criminal prosecution of Justin Bourque, a 24-year-old Moncton resident, who shot five officers from the Royal Canadian Mounted Police (RCMP), killing three and severely injuring two. Smith sentenced Bourque three consecutive life sentences with no chance of parole for 75 years, the most severe criminal sentence in Canada since the abolition of the death penalty.

=== Judicature Act ===
On 5 February 2016, the Liberal government of Brian Gallant proposed in Bill 21 to curb the Chief Justice's administrative management powers, wherein the Minister of Justice would reserve for the executive arm the geographic placement of Queen's Bench judges. The amendment to the Judicature Act effects that the chief justice cannot designate "a new place of residence" for a judge "without first obtaining the consent" of the justice minister. Smith stated that he was "surprised to learn that the minister of justice had introduced a bill subjecting decisions of the chief justice of the Court of Queen's Bench to his consent without any notice to or consultation with that chief justice." Bill 21 lapsed when Gallant ended the first session of the 58th New Brunswick Legislature. NDP leader Dominic Cardy implied during a June interview that the Liberals were "trying to protect a political friend, already sitting as a judge, from being moved by Smith."

Smith had made a Freedom of Information request earlier in the year; the request forced by law the government to issue on 27 June a description or summary of the documents in question so that both parties could refer to concrete items. The 54-page summary raised more questions, and caused consternation over the speed at which the bill had been drafted: Gallant's office had begun the discussion of the bill on 24 January, less than two weeks prior to its introduction in the legislature on 5 February. On the same day, Gallant transferred authority over the bill to Stephen Horsman, who was then Minister of Justice. Dozens of emails were exchanged between officials "regarding urgency". The Law Society of New Brunswick and the Canadian Bar Association had taken positions favourable to Smith's cause by 4 July.

The changes to the Judicature Act were reintroduced as Bill 17 on 16 November, shortly after the new session began with a Speech from the Throne on 2 November. Also on that date, Smith's Freedom of Information request to obtain documents related to the identity of the drafters of the bill failed. On 16 January 2017 in a speech to the Moncton Rotary Club, Smith divulged that he had asked the Canadian Superior Courts Judges Association to challenge the Bill in the Supreme Court of Canada. The Gallant government, as of January 2017, refused to provide a specific example of a transfer that they found unacceptable or that they would have vetoed. Smith has only made transfers "as a result of a vacancy, and as a result of a request by a judge. There was never a judge moved that hadn't made a request to make that move." It was looking grim for Smith's gambit two months later; the head of the CSCJA noted that the judicial reference procedure is available in Canada only to executive branches of government. On 18 April, the Board of the CSCJA concurred with its head, and stated that Smith's request "is not an appropriate role for the association". Bill 17 passed into law on 5 May 2017.
