= 2014 Moncton shootings =

Shooting of five police officers in Canada

Moncton shootings
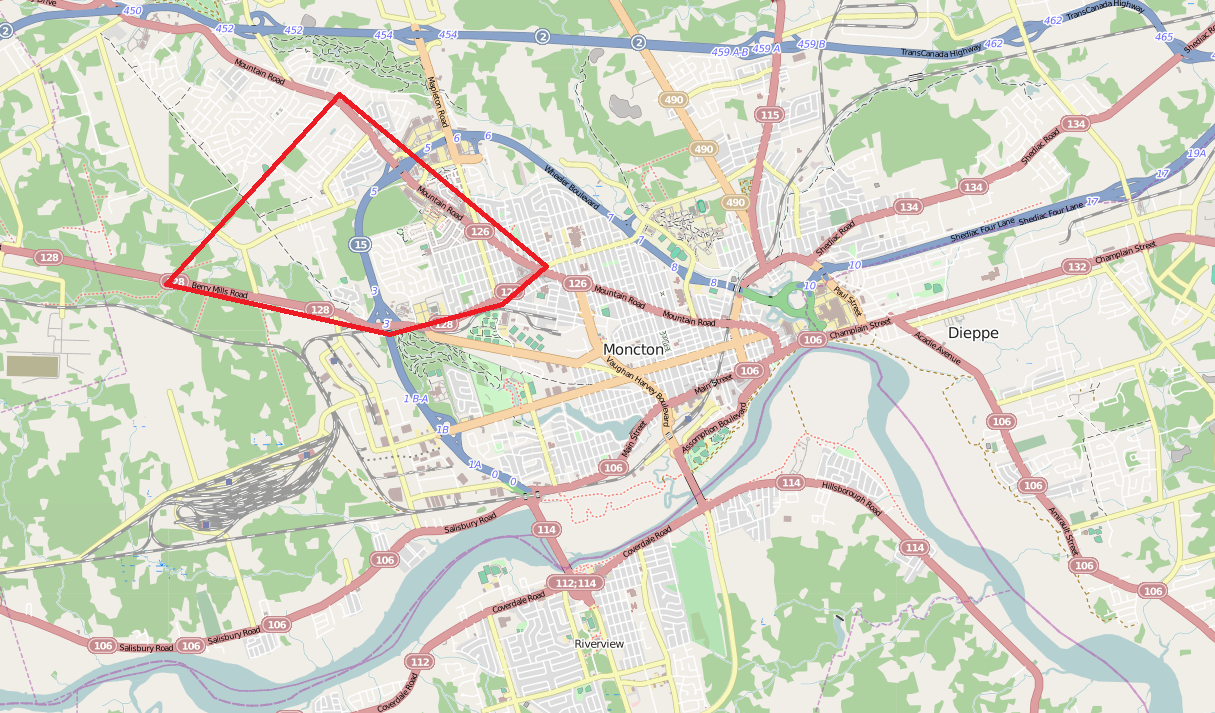
- Map showing the area (red trapezoid at centre-left) of Moncton under lockdown following the shootings.
- Location: 46°05′27″N 64°47′26″W; Moncton, New Brunswick, Canada
- Date: June 4, 2014– June 6, 2014; 7:18 p.m.–12:10 a.m. (UTC−03:00)
- Attack type: Spree killing, shootout, ambush, mass shooting
- Weapons: Polytech/Norinco M14S (.308); Mossberg 500 SPX; Knife
- Deaths: 3
- Injuries: 2
- Perpetrator: Justin Bourque
- Motive: Anti-police sentiment Dislike for the government

The Moncton shootings were a string of shootings that took place on June 4, 2014, in Moncton, in the Canadian province of New Brunswick. The perpetrator, Justin Bourque, a 24-year-old Moncton resident, walked around the northern area of the city and shot five officers from the Royal Canadian Mounted Police (RCMP), killing three and severely injuring two. A manhunt for Bourque was launched and continued overnight and into June 5. On June 6, Bourque was found and taken into custody, ending a manhunt that lasted over 28 hours. The shooting was both Moncton's first homicide since 2010 and the deadliest attack on the RCMP since the Mayerthorpe tragedy in 2005, which left four RCMP officers dead. Bourque intended for the shootings to trigger a rebellion against the Canadian government. He was sentenced to life in prison, with no eligibility for parole until after serving 25 years.

== Background ==
Moncton is the most populous city in New Brunswick, Canada, located along the Petitcodiac River valley in the eastern part of the province. In 2011, the city had a population of 69,074. The Royal Canadian Mounted Police (RCMP) is the national police force in Canada, with the Codiac Regional RCMP being the force's detachment in Moncton. This detachment serves as the means of law enforcement in the city as well as nearby areas including Dieppe and Riverview. As of 2022, this detachment had 147 officers.

== Shootings ==
At around 6:00 p.m. on June 4, 2014, Justin Bourque purchased three boxes of ammunition in the presence of a friend, who did not find it unusual since the two of them planned to go to a shooting range. During the late hours of that same day, Bourque left his rented home, dressed in camouflage and carrying an M14 rifle and a shotgun. He calmly walked down a road in his trailer park, passing several neighbours along the way.

At 7:18 p.m. ADT, the first 9-1-1 call was made to police about an armed man walking down a sidewalk on Pioneer Avenue and towards the woods west of the street. Twelve officers of the Royal Canadian Mounted Police (RCMP) responded to the scene and set up a perimeter around the woods and the surrounding neighbourhood. Bourque was first seen by Constable Mathieu Daigle stepping out of the forest, crossing a street, and entering another wooded area that bordered the backyards of several houses. Daigle sent out a radio transmission describing Bourque, but some radio static was heard, which made the description difficult to understand. Daigle was then joined by Csts. Fabrice Gevaudan and Rob Nickerson as they trailed Bourque, who was headed toward a house on Bromfield Court, where five other officers were positioned. All of the officers were intending on maintaining visual contact on Bourque while waiting for the arrival of Police Dog Services, who were scheduled to arrive in a few minutes.

Bourque first opened fire at 7:46 p.m. after heading towards a backyard, during which he allegedly heard one of the officers shouting "Hey!". He fired three shots at Gevaudan, all of which missed. Gevaudan fled and radioed the officers that he was being shot at, before being hit twice in the torso from about 30 meters away. He died almost instantly. Gevaudan's body was found a few minutes later and dragged into a nearby garage by other officers, where CPR was attempted.

Bourque then fled the woods and emerged southeast of McCoy Street, where he continued walking in a straight line on Mailhot Avenue. There, two minutes after he shot Gevaudan, he encountered Constable David Ross, who was driving a police SUV down the road. Ross drew his service pistol and accelerated his vehicle towards Bourque as he was turning to face his direction. Ross fired two shots at Bourque through his windshield, while Bourque returned fire with his M14 rifle, firing six shots back at him. Ross was shot twice in the hand and left shoulder, with a third fatal shot being directed at the head. It was believed Ross was attempting to hit Bourque with his vehicle or get within range to open fire with his service weapon. Constable Erik White later found his body still slumped inside the driver's seat before being forced to take cover behind the vehicle after spotting Bourque taking aim at him from further down the street.

At 7:54 p.m., Constable Martine Benoît arrived at the intersection of Hildegard Drive and Mailhot Avenue, being guided there by a civilian who was following Bourque and reporting where he was headed via 9-1-1 call. Bourque, taking cover in a deeply shaded and wooded ditch, opened fire on her and disabled her police vehicle with gunfire, preventing her from escaping. Constable Éric Stéphane J. Dubois responded to assist her and was wounded by gunfire while trying to give Benoît additional cover. Bourque then crossed Hildegard Drive and left, allowing Dubois to flee to the local fire station nearby. Benoît, unaware that she was safe, remained inside her vehicle for a period of time and had to be picked up by another officer. At 7:59 p.m., seconds after the Hildegard shooting, Constable Marie Darlene Goguen responded to the fire station in her police vehicle, whereupon she was fired at while still seated inside and hit twice. Goguen was able to flee from the immediate vicinity with the help of Constable Donnie Robertson. Both Dubois and Goguen survived their gunshot wounds. At this point, communications became confusing and chaotic, with the details of casualties, shooting locations, and Bourque's location varying.

At 8:04 p.m., Constable Douglas Larche, who was plain-clothed but also wearing body armour, and armed with a shotgun, responded at Mailhot Avenue. There, he was spotted by Bourque, who then concealed himself behind several trees and fired four shots at him, wounding him. Larche returned fire with seven shots from his service pistol. Nearby residents tried to warn him about Bourque, but he was fatally shot in the neck as he tried to take cover behind his car. The entire exchange of gunfire lasted for 70 seconds. It was captured on a cellphone camera, filmed by nearby residents. Bourque then fled the scene at 8:13 p.m. and escaped into the woods behind Isington Street. He had been last sighted near Ryan Street and Wheeler Boulevard.

Late on June 4, it was reported that three RCMP officers were killed, while two other officers were hospitalized with non-life-threatening injuries. According to witnesses, Bourque spotted and even spoke to several civilians while lying in wait, and left without shooting at them. Other witnesses reported that he actually waved away civilians when they tried helping the officers. The New York Times reported that television footage showed "several cars and police vehicles with bullet holes and shattered windows". The northwest area of Moncton was locked down while the search for the shooter was in progress; public buses were pulled from the streets, and all entrances to the locked-down area were sealed.

=== Manhunt ===
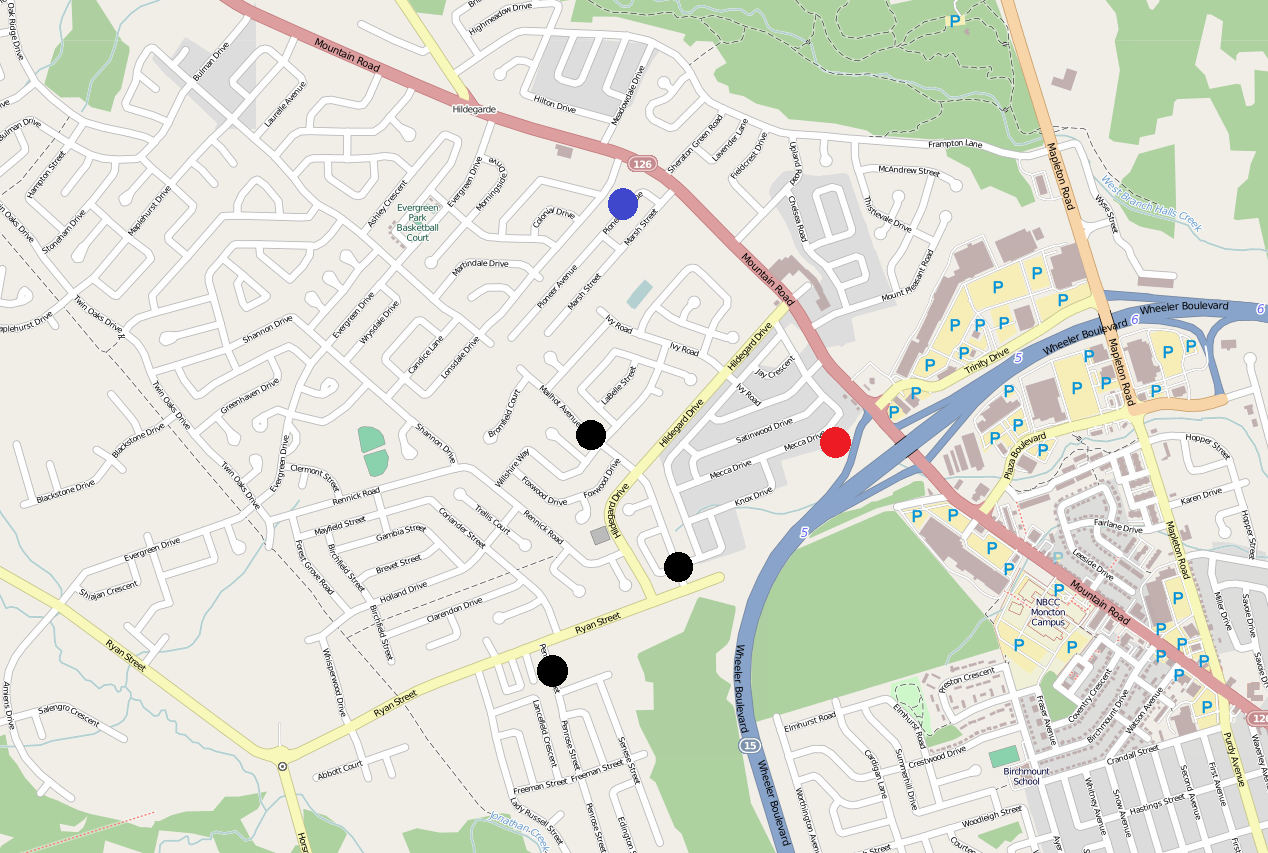
Red circle: Suspect found Black circles: Shooting locations Blue circle: Suspect's residence

Authorities named Bourque as the suspect after his family and friends saw photos of him during the shootings on Hildegard Drive circulating on news reports and social media. Multiple sightings of the suspect, by police and the public, continued in the second day of the manhunt. Up to 300 police personnel were involved in the search. Because Bourque's location was unknown at the time and he was heavily armed, a definitive perimeter and containment protocol was not established and all of the officers' activities were considered high-risk.

Pedestrians and motorists were asked to stay away from the area of the search; public transit was suspended; and schools, government offices, stores, and businesses were closed. Residents were later instructed to lock their doors, leave their exterior lights on, and refrain from broadcasting police movements on social media sites.

The next day, police surrounded an apartment building and were broadcasting a demand to exit over a public address system. More than a dozen armed officers surrounded the building and deployed a robot with a camera inside at approximately 3:00 p.m. Minutes later, they left the apartment complex after finding no sign of Bourque. The report that called police over to the building later turned out to be a false alarm. A police helicopter with thermal-imaging cameras was deployed to search Moncton. At least two armoured cars were borrowed by the RCMP to transport heavily armed tactical team members.

On June 6, at 12:10 a.m. (Atlantic Daylight Time), Bourque was located in the woods by the RCMP with the help of a special Transport Canada Dash 8 National Aerial Surveillance Program aircraft's thermal imaging camera, after a resident saw him crouched below a window in a yard on Mecca Drive and called police. The lock-down, in effect for approximately 28 hours in the north end of Moncton, was lifted shortly thereafter. While being taken into custody, Bourque reportedly told police, "I'm done." He was unarmed at the time of his arrest, but several weapons were found at the scene. On June 7, a search was launched at a field and a wooded area located near the scene of the arrest.

=== Victims ===
Three RCMP officers were killed in the shootings and another two injured. All five shooting victims were identified by police two days after the shootings. The dead were identified as Cst. Dave Ross, 32, of Victoriaville, Quebec; Cst. Fabrice Georges Gevaudan, 45, of Boulogne-Billancourt, France; and Cst. Douglas James Larche, 40, of Saint John, New Brunswick. The two surviving officers were identified as Cst. Éric Stéphane J. Dubois and Cst. Marie Darlene Goguen. On August 11, the causes of death were released in an agreed statement of facts filed by the Moncton Queen's Bench. Ross died from a gunshot wound to the head, Gevaudan died of two gunshot wounds to the chest, and Larche died of shots to the neck and left flank.

== Perpetrator ==
Justin Christien Bourque
- Born: November 12, 1989 (age 37); Moncton, New Brunswick, Canada
- Occupation: Employee at Rolly's Wholesale Ltd.
- Status: Incarcerated
- Conviction: Pleaded guilty to all counts August 8, 2014
- Criminal charges: First-degree murder, attempted murder
- Penalty: Life sentence with no possibility of parole for 75 years (later reduced to 25 years)
- Capture status: Apprehended June 6, 2014

Details
- Imprisoned at: Atlantic Institution

Justin Christien Bourque (born November 12, 1989), a resident of Moncton, was named by authorities as a suspect in the shootings. He was 24 years old at the time. Bourque explained in a police interview following his arrest that his actions were a rebellion of sorts against the Canadian government, which he believed to be oppressive. He stated that he believed that police officers were protecting such a government. During the shooting incident, Bourque was dressed in military camouflage and wore a green headband.

=== Life prior to shooting ===
Bourque was born as one of seven children in a religious family and was home-schooled. Eighteen months prior to the shooting, he moved out of his parents' home and into a trailer park in Moncton's Ryder Park neighbourhood. Bourque had been forced to move out on his parents' request following a dispute over his purchase of a second firearm and his "inappropriate behaviour". He had recently quit his job working at a local grocery store, and had just been hired by Rolly's Wholesale.

=== Behavioural problems ===
A former coworker of Bourque said that "he's always seemed to have a problem with authority. Issues with parents, bosses, police..." Bourque also reportedly held anti-government and anti-authority views, and talked about killing other people and himself. Two days before the shooting, Bourque made rants against all figures of authority to his father, during which he was described as becoming "paranoid".

The day after the shooting, a local firearm and outdoor supply store, Worlds End Warehouse, issued a statement on their Facebook page, confirming that Bourque was known personally by employees of the store but that he "was never a customer and never purchased firearms or ammunition from [them]".

One of Bourque's friends described an incident where Bourque had gone camping with several coworkers and brought "his rifle with him, without ammunition, which he held onto the whole night while drinking. That kind of freaked us out, so we didn't invite him the next time". It remains unclear if anyone had previously reported safety concerns related to Bourque's firearm possession, but local police stated that he "was not known to them". In Canada, individuals who are concerned about the mental state or intentions of a firearms owner can notify the Canadian Firearms Program so that police can investigate.

Following his arrest, Bourque claimed that he originally planned to harm the oil industry by setting fire to several Moncton gas stations and then shoot random people, but abandoned the plan due to issues with his bicycle. He purchased the .308 Poly Technologies Model M305 battle rifle used in the shootings on July 24, 2009, legally, but had an expired license at the time of the shooting.

=== Online posts ===
The media reported that Bourque's Facebook account was filled with images and "occasionally jokey posts about the right to bear arms". The press reported that his social media contained anti-police posts as well. A post added to his Facebook page the day of the shooting contains a photo with a quote from Dave Chappelle, "You ever notice a cop will pull you over for a light out, but if your car is broke down they drive right past you?" He also tended to share images with slogans such as "Free Men Do Not Ask Permission to Bear Arms" and "Militia Is Only a Bad Word if You're a Tyrant".

In his Facebook page, Bourque also posted his beliefs that Canada was "too soft" to survive an impending attack, and earlier in 2014 wrote that people paying attention to the upcoming 86th Academy Awards were ignoring that: "The third world war could be right around the corner, wishful thinking isn't gonna stop this one." Three weeks after that post, he also warned that: "Canada is one of the world's most likely targets Russia would invade at the start of a war due to pushover resistance." A few hours prior to the shooting, Bourque posted lyrics from "Hook in Mouth", a song by American thrash metal band Megadeth.

== Legal proceedings ==
After his arrest, Bourque admitted responsibility to the shootings and claimed that he committed them in an attempt to spark a rebellion against the Canadian government, which he believed was oppressive, corrupt, and serving only the wealthy at the expense of other citizens.

In the afternoon on June 6, Bourque made his first court appearance at a Moncton courthouse under heavy guard. He was charged with three counts of first-degree murder and two counts of attempted murder. Also on June 6, Bourque confessed to the crimes in a videotaped one-on-one interview; this, along with one hundred other pieces of evidence, was released into the public domain five weeks after his trial was over. On July 3, Bourque briefly reappeared in a Moncton provincial court. He made his next court appearance on July 31 after undergoing a psychiatric assessment requested by his lawyer. Bourque was found fit to stand trial.

On August 8, Bourque entered guilty pleas to the three counts of first-degree murder and the two counts of attempted murder. On October 27, he apologized to the families of the slain RCMP officers. On October 31, Chief Justice David Smith gave Bourque two concurrent life sentences for the two attempted murders, and three consecutive 25 year minimum sentences for the three premeditated murders, without the possibility of parole for 75 years. This ruling, which fell under the federal government's 2011 enactment to give courts the option of consecutive sentences in cases of multiple murders, was considered the harshest sentence given since the abolition of capital punishment in Canada in 1967. Bourque's parole ineligibility period would later be reduced to 25 years in 2022, after the Supreme Court of Canada ruled that excessively long non-parole periods were unconstitutional.

== Responses ==
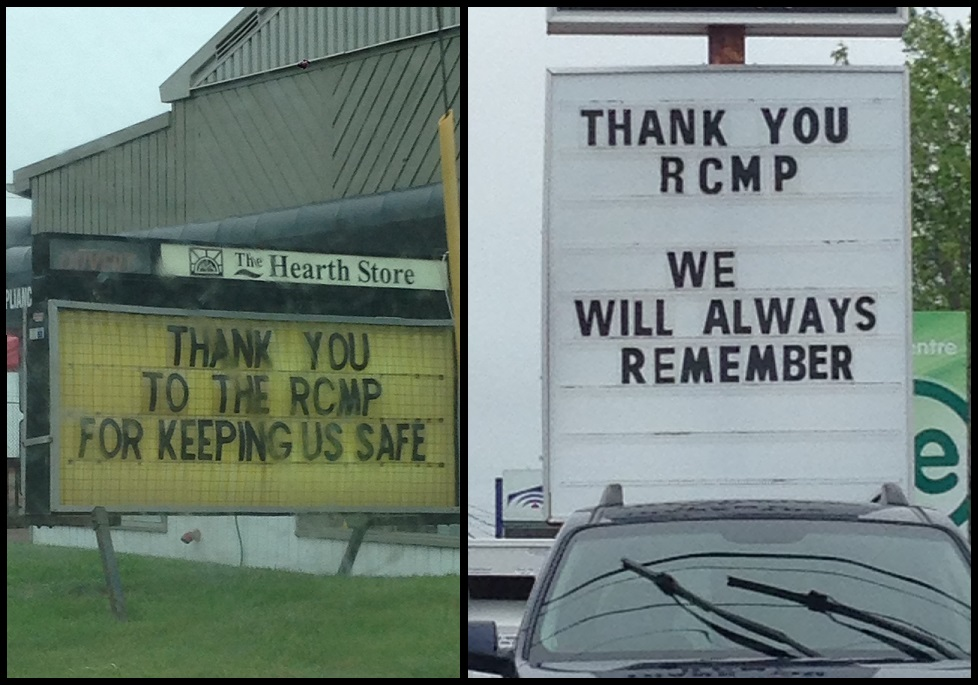
Local businesses express their gratitude for the RCMP after the suspect was apprehended

=== RCMP and Canadian government ===
In the wake of the shooting, the New Brunswick Premier David Alward issued a statement, saying that he felt "incredible grief" from the killings, and offered condolences to the families of the slain officers. RCMP Assistant Commissioner Roger Brown, commanding officer of New Brunswick's "J" Division, called June 4 "perhaps the darkest day in the history of RCMP New Brunswick". Moncton Mayor George LeBlanc said in a statement on Twitter: "Terrible sad news for Moncton. Stay indoors and allow police to do their job. Prayers for the families." The House of Commons observed a moment of silence prior to question period the day after the initial shooting.

Canadian Prime Minister Stephen Harper also issued a statement, saying, "On behalf of all Canadians, Laureen and I offer our deepest condolences to the families, colleagues and friends of those affected by this tragedy. We also offer our prayers for the speedy recovery of those injured." He also remarked that this incident reminds us that "men and women in law enforcement put their lives on the line in Canada every day to protect our citizens and communities". The overall commanding officer of the RCMP, Commissioner Bob Paulson, released a statement saying, "Their deaths are beyond comprehension. Their ultimate sacrifices will never be forgotten."

An internal review was announced by the RCMP on June 9 to investigate whether the five officers shot were adequately armed and protected to deal with Bourque, who was armed with high-powered firearms, and how to prevent a similar incident from occurring. The review was later ordered on July 3. However, the decision for an internal review was criticized, with many calling for an independent inquiry. Among the critics was Darryl Davies, a criminologist from Carleton University, who had made a report for the RCMP in 2009 about the Mayerthorpe tragedy which left four RCMP officers dead; the report recommended officers be immediately given training and equipped with high-powered firearms. Davies alleged that his report was ignored by the RCMP and believes that an internal review will not result in long-term changes, saying, "I think an internal inquiry is not going to be transparent, number one – that's why we need a public inquiry."

On January 16, 2015, the RCMP released the MacNeil Review, an independent review that was conducted by former RCMP Assistant Commissioner Alphonse MacNeil. It included a total of 64 recommendations concerning supervision, training, technology and equipment, communications, and aftercare. The review revealed that there were complications in communication between officers during the shootings because multiple officers were sending radio transmission at once, and that none of the first responding officers were wearing their body armour. The RCMP publicly announced that it accepted and will implement all of the recommendations, and would keep the public updated on their progress.

On 15 May 2015, the RCMP was charged with four Canada Labour Code violations; someone who is found guilty of contravening Section 148(1) is liable to a maximum $1-million fine and/or a prison sentence of two years. The RCMP entered not-guilty pleas in May 2016. A spokesman for the Mounted Police Professional Association of Canada said he was "surprised and horrified at the same time" by the pleas. The wife of one of the victims, Nadine Larche, wrote in a public email that:

Change in this organization is needed before tragic history repeats itself... Had they had proper equipment, proper training and information, I believe that the outcome of that day would have been very different.

On 6 January 2017, the date 18 April 2017 was set for the start of the trial of the violations, with provincial court Chief Justice R. Leslie Jackson to hear what was expected to be a two-month trial.

When the violations trial began in April 2017, the first prosecution witness was RCMP Superintendent Bruce Stuart. Stuart testified that: "C8 carbines were eventually approved by the RCMP senior executive committee in September 2011, more than two and a half years before the Moncton shootings... [I] would have proceeded with a national rollout..." instead of the haphazard and partial one that followed one year later. The final Crown witness was MacNeil, author of the 2015 Review, who lamented that nobody took command during the rampage, so officers were forced to make their own decisions amid the chaos. MacNeil said few front-line supervisors were trained to take control of such situations at the time, that no officers had put on body armour, and that at the time of the incident, RCMP officers in Moncton had only been trained with pistols.

=== Gun control ===
Bourque acquired the weapons used in the attack legally. After losing two of its members in the attack, the Canadian gun rights advocacy organization the National Firearms Association (NFA) released a statement offering their condolences and deploring the incident. They also claimed, "Incidents like these demonstrate...that none of Canada's firearms control efforts over the past 50 years have had any effect on preventing violence, or otherwise stopping bad people from carrying out their evil deeds... The excessive rules in place do not in any way increase public safety, but merely contribute to an expensive and unnecessary regime which harms only those of lawful intent." The executive director of the Canadian Sport Shooting Association felt that the NFA statement was premature and that, instead of gun control, this incident should lead to discussions about "mental health issues." The NFA stood by their statement, claiming that they were responding to the calls for tighter gun control that people on social media and in the government were making.

A gun control organization, the Coalition for Gun Control, felt the incident was too recent to begin discussing changes. At the same time, a prominent supporter of the group and practising psychiatrist Ron Charach published an op-ed piece in the Toronto Star calling for more stringent gun control. Among other things, he called for the reclassification of semiautomatic rifles as prohibited, the restoration of the Long Gun Registry, and "[a]n absolute ban on urban gun collecting..."

== Memorial services ==
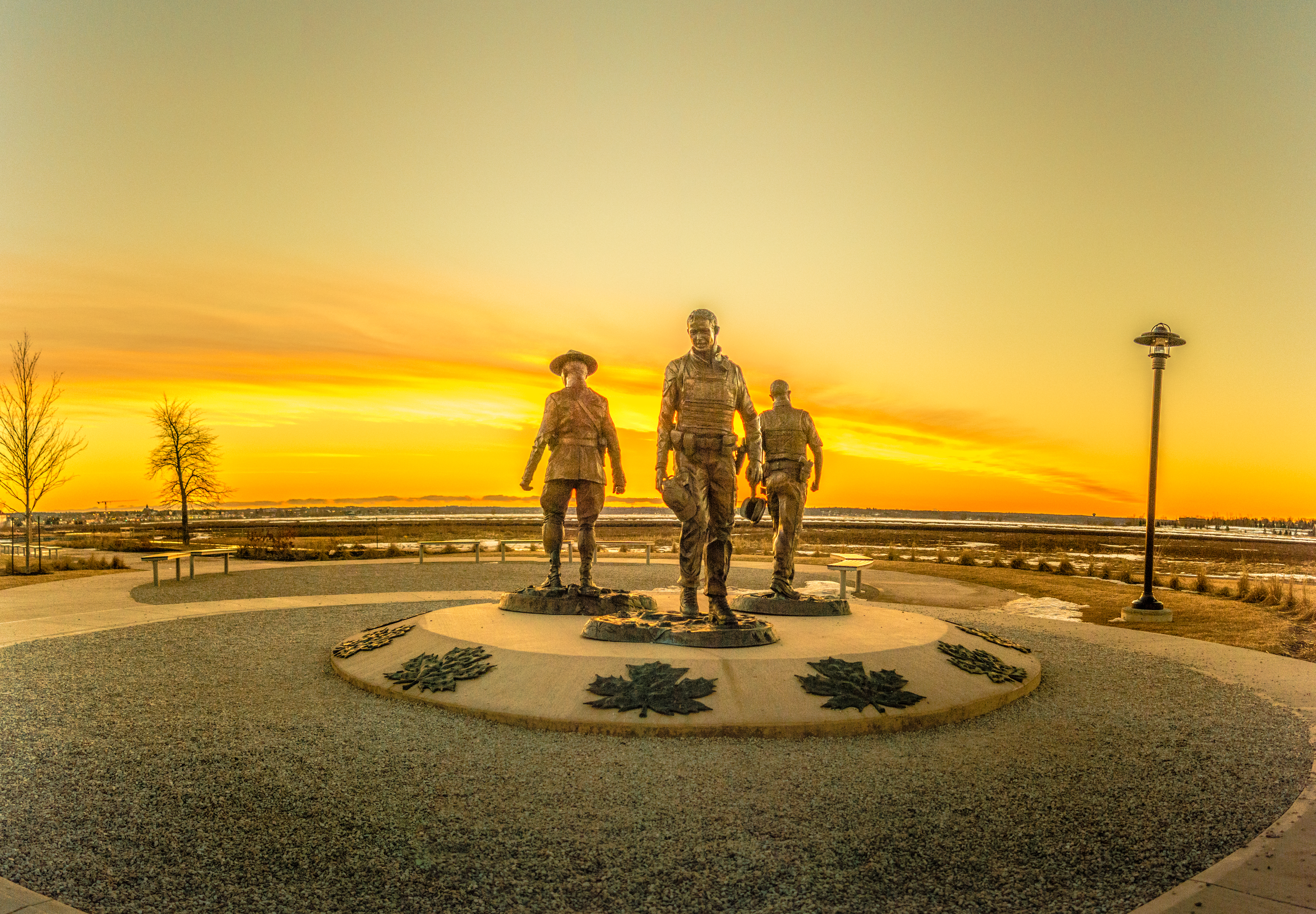
Memorial statues made in honour of the three RCMP officers killed in the shooting in Moncton

On social media, the hashtag #PrayforMoncton began trending. In response to the shootings, the RCMP created an e-mail for the public to send in their condolences, and the RCMP Foundation set up a fund to donate money to the families of the slain and injured officers. A regimental funeral was held on June 10 at the Moncton Coliseum, with close to 3,000 police officers and many other mourners in attendance.

In 2015, memorial statues were made by Canadian sculptor Morgan MacDonald, featuring the three murdered officers standing in a circle. The statues were placed in Moncton's Riverfront Park, located by the Petitcodiac River.

== See also ==
- 2020 Nova Scotia attacks
- 2014 shootings at Parliament Hill, Ottawa
- Canadian Firearms Registry
- David Wynn
- Fredericton shooting
- Gun politics in Canada
- Mayerthorpe tragedy
- Spiritwood Incident
- List of law enforcement officers killed in the line of duty in Canada
