= Spiritwood Incident =

Shootings of three police in Canada

- Location: From Spiritwood, Saskatchewan to Mildred, Saskatchewan
- Date: July 7, 2006; 20 years ago (UTC−06:00)
- Attack type: Shooting
- Weapon: .30-30 Winchester Model 1894
- Deaths: 2
- Injuries: 1
- Perpetrator: Curtis Dagenais

The Spiritwood Incident was a shooting that occurred on July 7, 2006, during a police pursuit in Saskatchewan, Canada, killing two of the three RCMP officers involved.

It began in the town of Spiritwood, a community of about 1,000 people located approximately 148 kilometres (92 mi) northwest of Saskatoon, and ended near Mildred, approximately 27 kilometres (17 mi) away.

== Incident ==
On July 7, 2006, three officers from the RCMP detachment in Spiritwood, Constables Robin Cameron (29), Marc Bourdages (26), and Michelle Knopp, responded to a complaint of an assault at a home close to the detachment. A man later identified as Curtis Alfred Dagenais (41) fled the scene in a pickup truck. The officers followed, and the ensuing pursuit lasted 27 kilometres (17 mi). The pursuit came to an end when RCMP officers Cameron and Bourdages rammed their vehicle into Mr. Dagenais' and pushed it up against a tree. Mr. Dagenais then discharged his firearm, striking Officers Cameron and Bourdages each in the head. Moments later, Officer Knopp arrived on scene, and Mr. Dagenais again discharged his firearm. Officer Knopp was struck by bullet fragments in the arm, ear, and torso. Dagenais abandoned his car and escaped on foot.

Working in the nearby town of Shellbrook that night, Staff Sergeant Barry Thomas received a call for back-up, and was one of the first officers to find the constables at the scene. The two officers later died of their wounds, Cameron on July 15 and Bourdages early the next morning, on July 16. The bullet fragments that struck Knopp have since remained embedded in her ear, arm, and torso.

A massive manhunt failed to find Dagenais, who turned himself in without incident to the RCMP's Spiritwood detachment on July 18, after twelve days. While he was on the run, Dagenais mailed a self-justifying 5-page letter to the Edmonton Sun.

== Trial and aftermath ==
Dagenais' trial took place in 2009 at the Court of King's Bench for Saskatchewan in Saskatoon, before Justice Gerald Allbright. During the trial, Dagenais argued he had not intentionally shot the officers. He claimed that he feared for his life and shot in blind panic out in self-defence and that the three officers fired first after ramming his truck. The Crown argued that it was Dagenais who had fired first and intentionally shot the officers.

After two days of deliberations, on 12 March 2009, the jury found him guilty of two counts of first-degree murder and one count of attempted murder. He is not eligible for parole until 2031.

On September 17, 2012, Dagenais was granted an appeal date for October 25. After less than 10 minutes of deliberation, the appeal was dismissed on all 3 points.

The surviving officer from the incident, Constable Michelle Knopp, was awarded the Medal of Bravery on February 26, 2009, which was invested on May 6, 2011.

== See also ==
- David Wynn
- Mayerthorpe tragedy
- Moncton shooting
- List of law enforcement officers killed in the line of duty in Canada
