= Mayerthorpe tragedy =

Murder of four police officers in Canada

- Location: 54°0′55″N 115°1′18″W; North of Rochfort Bridge, Alberta, Canada
- Date: Thursday, March 3, 2005; 9:57–10:00 am MST (UTC−07:00)
- Attack type: Mass shooting, murder-suicide, shootout, ambush
- Weapons: Heckler & Koch HK-91; .300 Winchester Magnum Bolt-action rifle (unused); Beretta M9 (unused); Smith & Wesson Model 5946 (used by RCMP officers)
- Deaths: 5 (including perpetrator)
- Perpetrator: James Roszko (age 46)

Location of Mayerthorpe, Alberta

The Mayerthorpe tragedy was a fatal shooting that occurred on March 3, 2005, on the farm of James Roszko, approximately 11 km (6.8 mi) north of Rochfort Bridge near the town of Mayerthorpe in the Canadian province of Alberta.

Roszko shot and killed four Royal Canadian Mounted Police (RCMP) constables: Anthony Gordon, Lionide "Leo" Johnston, Brock Myrol and Peter Schiemann. He then committed suicide. The attack occurred as the officers were executing a search warrant for stolen property and a marijuana-growing operation on the farm. Two individuals who were not present at the shooting, Shawn Hennessey and Dennis Cheeseman, pled guilty to manslaughter for assisting Roszko to return to his farm.

The incident was the worst one-day loss of life for the RCMP since five officers drowned on June 7, 1958, and the worst multiple-officer killing in contemporary Canadian history.

== Incidents ==
=== Initial contact with Roszko ===
On the afternoon of March 2, 2005, two civil bailiffs went to the farm owned by James Roszko to repossess a truck he had purchased, but not made any payments on. The bailiffs arrived around 3:00 pm. There was a metal gate blocking the road into the farmyard. When Roszko saw the bailiffs, he released two large aggressive Rottweilers. The bailiffs decided to call the RCMP, and the officer who responded to their call warned them not to go onto the property until the RCMP arrived. Roszko had a criminal record, with violent and sexual offences, and was subject to a firearms possession prohibition. He was known to members of the Mayerthorpe RCMP Detachment.

Roszko swore at the bailiffs and drove off in a truck. The bailiffs thought it may have been the truck they were to seize, but were unsure.

Shortly after Roszko drove off, three RCMP officers arrived, including Constable Peter Schiemann. The bailiffs had the legal authority to search the farm for the truck, since they were unsure if the truck Roszko was using was the one they were to reposess. Acting under that authority, the bailiffs broke open the gate, and the Mounties confined the dogs in a shed. The group then went to the quonset hut in the farmyard, where they found numerous vehicle parts, indicating a stolen vehicle chop shop, and a marijuana grow-op. The Mounties realised that they would need a search warrant before proceeding any further. They left the quonset at approximately 4:15 pm and called in the truck as stolen, warning that other officers should be on the lookout for Roszko.

=== Property search ===
The senior officer in the group, Corporal James Martin, left to obtain a warrant, leaving two officers to maintain control of the farm. Martin returned at 8:40 pm with the warrant. Given the expected magnitude of the search, the warrant was valid for 24 hours. The Mounties first conducted a security search of the dwelling and the quonset, to ensure that Roszko was not present. While their search confirmed he was not on the farm, the RCMP found a radio scanner tuned to the frequency of the Whitecourt RCMP detachment in his residence. They also found lists containing intelligence on the local detachments at Mayerthorpe, Whitecourt, Barrhead and Evansburg, including officers' names, car numbers, and cell phone numbers. There was also a night vision scope and .308 and 9 mm caliber ammunition, which indicated Roszko was in breach of his firearms prohibition.

Having confirmed that Roszko was not there, the Mounties began searching the quonset. The initial focus was on the search and seizure of the marijuana plants and equipment, conducted by a special Green Team from the RCMP "K" Division in Edmonton. According to documents obtained by the CBC's The Fifth Estate via a court case, police seized seven living and 88 harvested marijuana plants from the residence, plus a further 192 living plants along with growing equipment from the quonset. The marijuana search concluded around 3:00 am on March 3, 2005.

All but two Mounties left at that point, with the expectation that an RCMP team specialising in stolen vehicle searches would arrive in the morning. Constables Anthony Gordon and Leo Johnston remained on the scene until the morning, with no signs of any trouble. As a security measure during the night, the Mounties parked several marked police vehicles prominently in the farmyard with their lights on. They also left the vehicle doors and man-door of the quonset wide open, with bright halogen lights on inside. The lights were also left on in the dwelling. The purpose was to make it clear that the Mounties were on the scene and investigating, and to deter unauthorised entry.

=== Roszko's return ===
After he fled the farm, Roszko phoned Shawn Hennessey, who worked in Barrhead and who subsequently admitted that he was associated with Roszko's grow-op. Roszko wanted to hide his truck on Hennessey's property. Hennessey refused, and contacted his brother-in-law, Dennis Cheeseman, for help dealing with Roszko. Roszko went to Hennessey's farm, and Hennessey and Cheeseman arrived there separately.

Roszko was armed with a Beretta handgun, and asked for a Winchester rifle that he knew Hennessey's grandfather had given him. Hennessey got the rifle, chambered in .300 Winchester Magnum, along with ammunition, and wiped it down. Cheeseman got a pillowcase and some gloves, put on the gloves, then put the rifle in the pillowcase and gave it to Roszko. It was clear to all there that Roszko was enraged at the police. He said he was going to go back to his farm to burn down the quonset, with the evidence of the chop shop and grow-op. He had decided to hide the truck at his aunt's home, and asked Hennessey and Cheeseman to follow him there, then drive him to his own farm. They agreed to do so. His aunt's house was 38.5 km from Roszko's farm.

After parking his truck at his aunt's house, Roszko got into the car driven by Hennessey, who drove him back to the area of Roszko's farm. On the way, Roszko continued to rant about the RCMP, saying he would get even with them. Cheeseman later said Roszko's ranting was "devil talk".

Roszko directed them to drive past the road leading to his own farm and go on to the next one. They could see the lights of the police cars at Roszko's farm. Sometime between 1:00 am and 3:00 am on March 3, 2005, Hennessey and Cheeseman dropped Roszko off. He pulled heavy socks over his boots, presumably to hide his tracks in the snow. He grabbed the Hennessey rifle and set off towards his farm and the police.

As they were driving away, Cheeseman suggested to Hennessey that they call police. He disagreed, and no call was made.

=== Shooting ===
On the morning of March 3, 2005, Constables Gordon and Johnston were still providing scene security, pending the arrival of the RCMP Auto Theft investigators. In a telephone report at around 9:00 am, Johnston advised Martin that the night had been uneventful. Martin decided to send Constable Myrol to the scene to assist with the auto theft investigators' search. Constable Schiemann was not assigned to work at the scene, but agreed to drop off Myrol. They also agreed to pick up some meat and a sedative to feed and calm down the dogs, who had not been fed since they had been put in the shed the day before. The two drove to the Roszko farm, arriving sometime after 9:30 am.

Just before 10:00 am, Constable Garrett Hoogestraat and Constable Stephen Vigor of the RCMP Auto Theft investigation unit arrived. They saw the four Mayerthorpe Mounties at the shed, presumably feeding the meat and sedatives to the Rottweilers. As Hoogestraat and Vigor prepared for the search, the four Mayerthorpe Mounties went towards the quonset. The doors to the quonset were still open, as they had been all night.

Unknown to the Mounties, Roszko was inside the quonset. The subsequent Fatalities Inquiry could not determine when he had returned, but the judge conducting the inquiry concluded that it was unlikely Roszko had entered the quonset much before daylight as he was dressed to spend the night outdoors. He had probably approached the quonset hiding under a sheet which the Mounties later found in the quonset, along with a pillowcase and workgloves. The sheet would have masked him against the snow, and the socks over his boots would have muffled his steps.

The four Mayerthorpe Mounties entered the quonset. Outside the quonset, Hoogestraat and Vigor heard two loud bangs, followed by several sounds they recognized as gunfire. They also heard screaming from within the quonset. Hoogestraat ran to the radio to report "officers down". Vigor started to the entrance of the quonset, when Roszko came out. He had a hunting rifle slung on his back, a pistol in his belt, and an HK91 semi-automatic rifle in his hands, and was seemingly relaxed. He then saw Vigor and stopped, apparently surprised that there were more Mounties outside. He quickly recovered and fired two shots at Vigor, who took shelter behind a police vehicle and returned fire with two shots from his sidearm. Both of his shots hit Roszko, who staggered back into the quonset.

Hoogestraat was unable to make radio contact with the officers in the quonset. The RCMP Emergency Response Team was called by 10:13 am and arrived by 11:52 am from Edmonton, which is normally an hour away from Mayerthorpe. An armoured vehicle from the Edmonton Garrison of the Canadian Forces was called in, but subsequently stood down as not needed. The Emergency Response Team sent in a Remote Mobile Investigator, a robot with a video camera attached, and determined that all four officers and Roszko were dead.

The Fatalities Inquiry later determined that Roszko killed all four officers, who died almost instantly. Only Johnston was able to return fire with one shot. Roszko was then wounded in the hand and thigh by the shots fired by Vigor outside the quonset. The shot to his thigh fractured his femur. After he went back into the quonset, he turned his weapon on himself, and fatally shot himself in the chest, with the bullet entering near his heart.

Roszko fired a total of 19 shots during the shootout, all of which were from the HK91 rifle. Johnston was shot four times, Schiemann three times, and Myrol and Gordon two times each.

== Victims ==
The police officers killed in the Mayerthorpe tragedy are referred to as "The Fallen Four". Constables Johnston, Myrol, and Schiemann were based out of the Mayerthorpe RCMP detachment, while Constable Gordon was based out of the Whitecourt RCMP detachment.

=== Anthony Gordon ===
Constable Anthony Gordon, who was born in Edmonton, Alberta and raised in Red Deer, Alberta, had become a police officer in October 2002. He was stationed in Whitecourt, 45 km (28 mi) west of Mayerthorpe, where he was assigned to general policing and highway patrol. Gordon was 28 at the time of his death.

=== Leo Johnston ===
Constable Lionide "Leo" Johnston had become a member of the RCMP in 2001. From Owl River, Alberta, he began his career in nearby Lac La Biche, Alberta before being transferred to Mayerthorpe. Johnston was 32 at the time of his death. He had married his wife, Kelly, on November 13, 2004.

=== Brock Myrol ===
Constable Brock Myrol was born in Outlook, Saskatchewan and raised in Red Deer. He had just graduated from the RCMP Academy, Depot Division and had been an officer with the Mayerthorpe RCMP for less than three weeks at the time of the tragedy. Myrol was 29 at the time of his death.

=== Peter Schiemann ===
Constable Peter Schiemann had become a member of the RCMP in 2000. From Petrolia, Ontario and raised in Stony Plain, Alberta, he began his career in Mayerthorpe and was assigned to general policing and highway patrol. Schiemann was 25 at the time of his death.

== Post-shooting investigation ==
=== Roszko's movements ===
The RCMP began an extensive investigation into the shooting, which lasted for two years. They spent more than $2 million investigating the tragedy, with over 200 officers involved in the case between 2005 and 2007. At the time charges were laid in 2007, there were still 40 Mounties working on it.

In particular, the Mounties wanted to find out how Roszko returned to his farm. His truck was found at his aunt's residence, 38.5 km from his own farm, suggesting he received some assistance in returning.

=== Search of Roszko's property ===
As part of the investigation, the RCMP conducted an extensive investigation of the Roszko property after the shootings, including manual searches, and also searches by subsurface radar, x-ray, and airborne infrared methods. A backhoe was also used. These search techniques disproved local rumours that Roszko had major caches of drugs and weapons, or that there were tunnels which he had used to enter the quonset.

The search found a sheet, a pillowcase containing a pair of workgloves, a small bottle of water, and a tin of bear spray in the northeast corner of the quonset. The inquiry concluded that Roszko likely concealed himself there for some time, but had been in the southeast corner of the quonset when he fired the shots. Subsequent DNA analysis found Hennessey's DNA on one of the workgloves.

=== Weapons ===
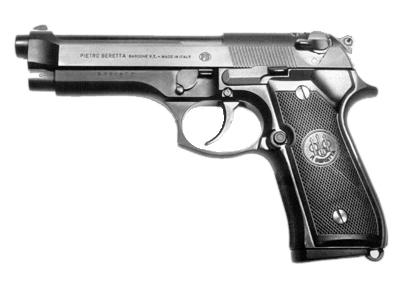
A Beretta 92 FS, similar to the gun Roszko possessed

The Mounties also found several weapons hidden in various spots in the quonset, including an empty gun bag that was the right size to hold the HK rifle, and an empty Beretta pistol case. These two cases, along with a .22 rifle and a shotgun in another case, were all hidden on a ledge and under the plywood roof, accessible only by ladder. The Fatalities Inquiry surmised that the HK rifle had been hidden there and retrieved by Roszko after his return, since he did not have it when he was with Hennessey and Cheeseman. The inquiry also concluded that the initial clearing search and the Green Team search would have been unlikely to find the weapons. The Mounties also found three additional rifles, in a gun case hidden inside a seed-drill in the quonset: a Husqvarna .308 rifle and two Lee-Enfield .303 rifles. There was also a rudimentary pipe bomb which would not have operated, a homemade silencing device, and various amounts of ammunition.

The Mounties investigated the sources for each of the guns. The HK rifle had been legally purchased by someone in Mayerthorpe in the early 1980s, who likely sold it to Rozsko. After changes to firearms laws in 1995, the HK rifle was classified as a prohibited firearm. The pistol was a Beretta 92 FS, which was a restricted weapon. Roszko had purchased it in Utah in 1993 and apparently smuggled it into Canada. The .22 rifle and shotgun were legally imported into Canada and were not restricted weapons. The three rifles found hidden in the seed-drill all had been stolen from a location in Barrhead in 1997. Roszko had never had a firearm registered to him.

The Mounties also investigated the Winchester hunting rifle, which was registered to Shawn Hennessey's grandfather John. When asked how Roszko obtained the rifle, Hennessey said he had no idea, and that the rifle had been stolen four months before the shooting. Shawn Hennessey subsequently admitted that he and his mother had alerted his grandfather that Roszko had the rifle. John Hennessey admitted that he had told his daughter and grandson that they should all "story" to the police that the rifle had been stolen from the back of his welding truck.

=== Cell phone records ===
A cell phone was found on Roszko's body. The police obtained warrants to track his usage of the phone. They found that he had begun to use the cell phone around the time he left his farm on March 2, 2005, continuing to do so until shortly before 1:00 am on March 3, 2005.

Investigation into the cell phone usage showed that he had called his mother, who had called his aunt. Interviews with his mother and aunt revealed that he had been seeking permission to hide his truck on his aunt's property.

The cell phone records also showed that Roszko phoned Hennessey's place of employment in Barrhead, and then made several calls to a bag phone (a robust incarnation of cell phone) which Hennessey had by virtue of his employment. Roszko also made several calls to Hennessey's residence. When information about the cell phone calls became public a year later, in 2006, Hennessey tearfully denied to a reporter for the Globe and Mail that he knew anything about the events, or why Roszko was calling him.

=== Undercover investigation ===
Media accounts revealed that the RCMP conducted an extensive undercover investigation in the two years after the shootings. It was later reported that it involved an undercover RCMP female officer posing as a potential love interest for Cheeseman, leading him to other undercover officers posing as gang members in a "Mr. Big" operation.

== Charges against Hennessey and Cheeseman ==
=== Murder charges ===
On July 9, 2007, Hennessey (then 28 years old), and Cheeseman (then 23 years old), were charged as parties to the offences committed by Roszko. In 2006, Hennessey had denied any links to the crime. Although neither man was at the crime scene when the shootings took place, under Canadian criminal law, anyone who is a party to the murder of a police officer acting in the course of their duties can be charged with first degree murder under the Criminal Code. In June 2008, they were committed to stand trial on the murder charges after a preliminary inquiry in the Provincial Court of Alberta.

=== Manslaughter sentences ===
On January 19, 2009, Hennessey and Cheeseman pled guilty to four counts of the lesser charge of manslaughter. On January 30, 2009, the Queen's Bench gave its decision on the sentences for the two men, which was based on an Agreed Statement of Facts, signed by Hennessey, Cheeseman, their lawyers and the Crown prosecutors. The Crown was seeking sentences in the range of ten to fifteen years, while the defence counsel argued the sentences should be in the range of three to five years.

In his decision, the Queen's Bench judge rejected the defence position and accepted the Crown position. He held that a fit sentence for Hennessey was fifteen years imprisonment, while a fit sentence for Cheeseman was twelve years. The Court gave them credit for their early guilty pleas and for time served awaiting trial, which reduced those initial estimates. He gave Hennessey a sentence of 10 years plus 4½ months. He gave Cheeseman a sentence of 7 years plus 2½ months in jail.

=== Appeals ===
Both men appealed their sentences to the Alberta Court of Appeal. On September 27, 2010, the Court unanimously dismissed Hennessey's appeal. The Court dismissed Cheeseman's appeal by a 2–1 majority, with the dissenting judge preferring to give a lower sentence in light of Cheeseman's lesser participation in the offence.

Hennessey and Cheeseman applied for leave to appeal to the Supreme Court of Canada in April and May 2011. The Supreme Court dismissed both applications on August 25, 2011.

=== Release ===
Cheeseman was granted statutory release in 2013, after serving two-thirds of his sentence without incident. Hennessey was paroled in 2015.

== Aftermath ==
=== Memorials ===
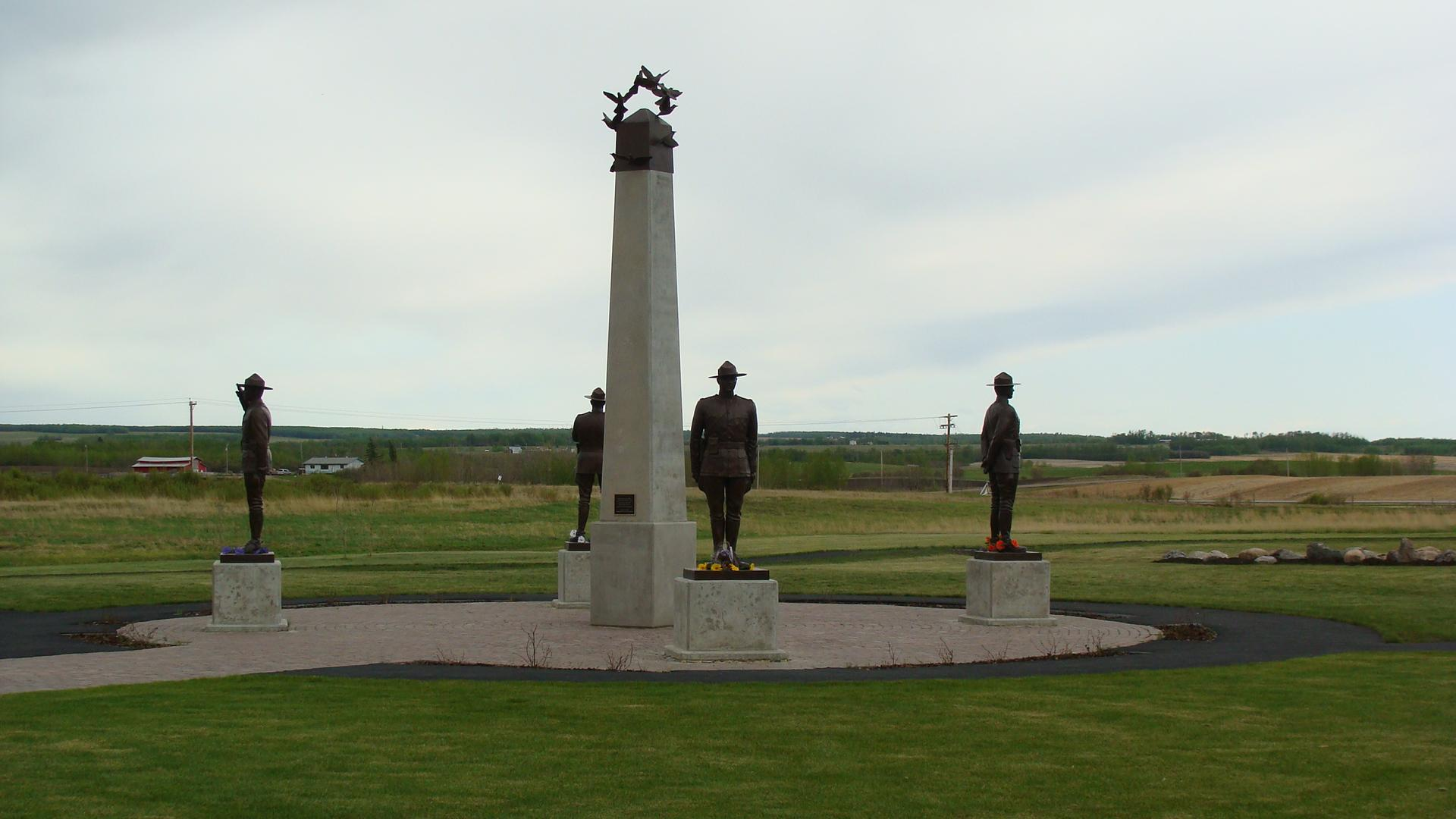
The memorial in Fallen Four Memorial Park in Mayerthorpe

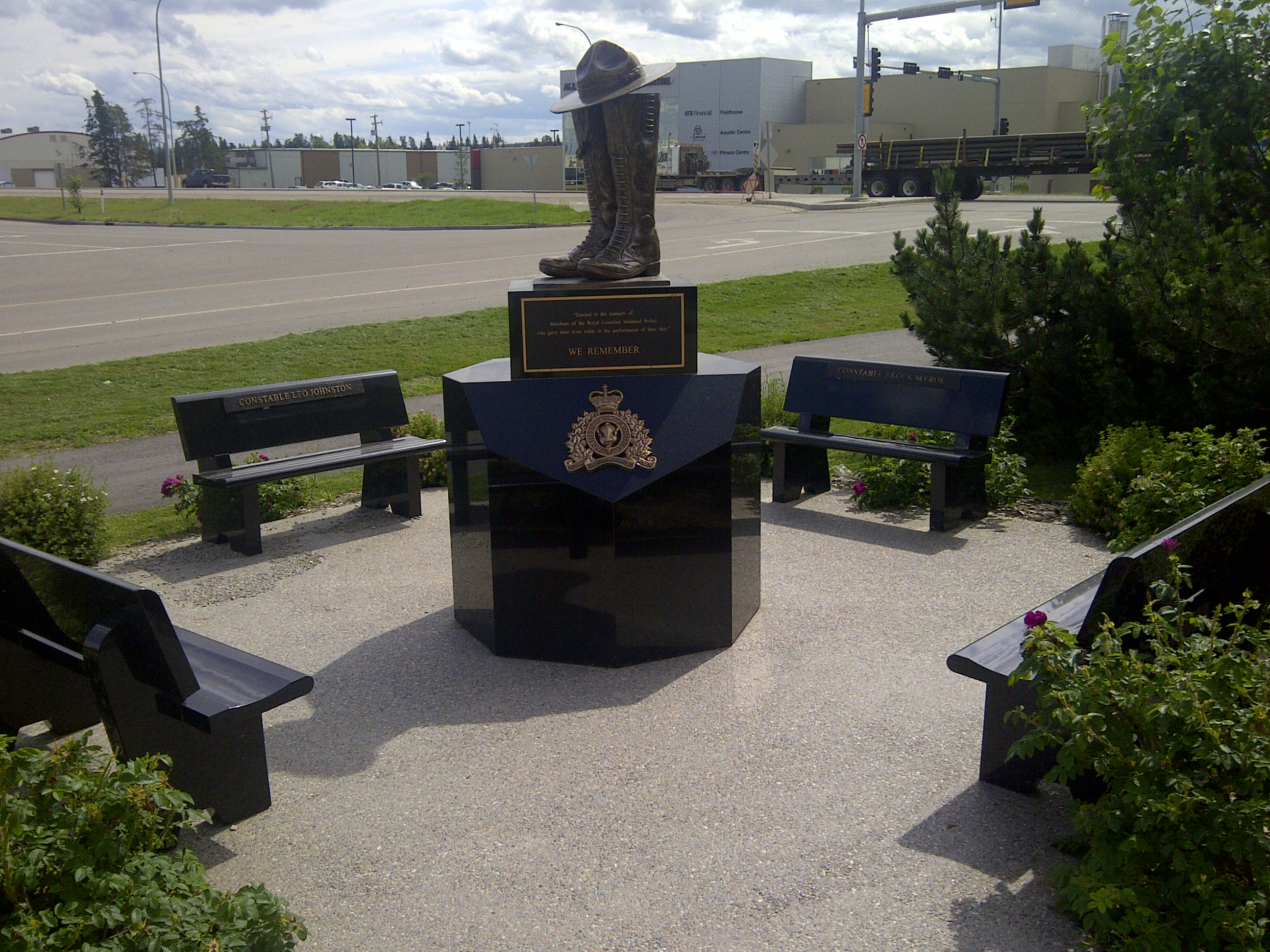
"We Remember" bronze statue outside the Whitecourt RCMP detachment honouring the Fallen Four

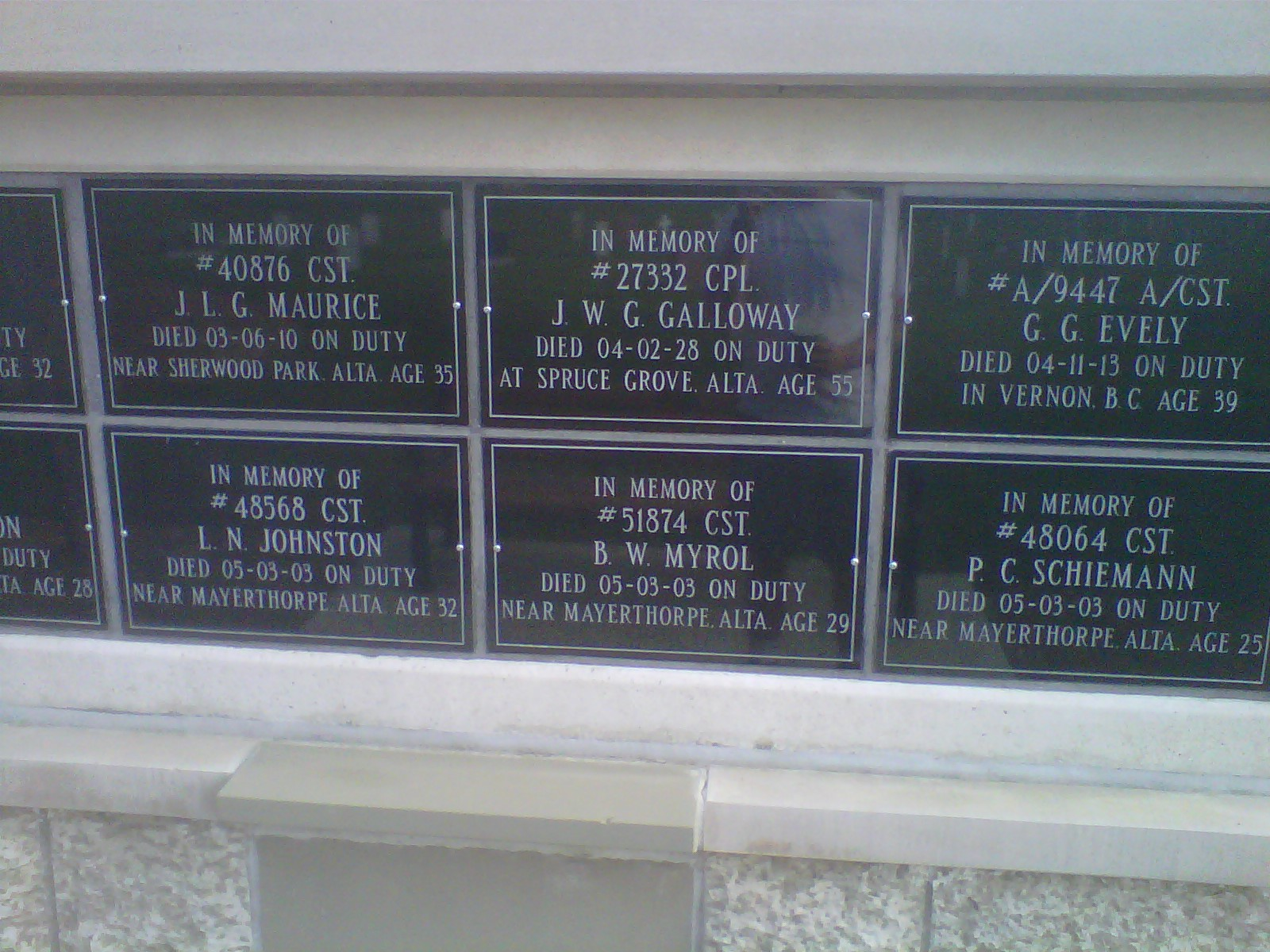
Names of the four Mounties (partial view of Cst. Gordon's, at left) engraved on the RCMP Cenotaph in Regina

A memorial service for the slain officers was held in Edmonton on March 10, 2005, and televised nationally on the CBC. Prime Minister Paul Martin and Governor General Adrienne Clarkson both spoke at the service. In addition to family and dignitaries, nearly 10,000 police officers from Canada and the United States were in attendance.

On May 19, 2005, Queen Elizabeth II attended a ceremony in honour of the slain officers at the RCMP Academy, Depot Division, in Regina, Saskatchewan. She also met privately with relatives of the four slain Mounties in the RCMP Chapel at Depot Division. At the time of the killings, she had sent a letter to the Lieutenant Governor of Alberta, expressing her shock and condolences.

The Fallen Four Memorial Society was founded to honour the slain policemen. The group initiated the building of the Fallen Four Memorial Park in Mayerthorpe, with a statue of each officer, which opened on July 4, 2008.

Also in 2008, a memorial in honour of the Fallen Four was unveiled in Whitecourt, Alberta, with a bench for each officer around a bronze statue of Constable Gordon's boots; Gordon was stationed at Whitecourt.

=== Media commentary ===
The CBC program The Fifth Estate produced two documentaries about the killings. The first one, entitled "A Hail of Bullets", aired on December 7, 2005. The documentary suggested there were discrepancies in the RCMP account of the shooting. Following the 2009 guilty pleas and sentencing of Cheeseman and Hennessey, the fifth estate did a second documentary, entitled "Collateral Damage", which aired on February 4, 2009. It included an interview with Hennessey. He now denied some of the material in the Agreed Statement of Facts which had been used in the sentencing hearing in Queen's Bench five days earlier. In the interview, Hennessey said that he did not know about the police search of Roszko's property, and that he had no idea Roszko had intended to attack the Mounties.

=== Alberta Fatalities Inquiry ===
The Minister of Justice convened a fatality inquiry into the deaths at Mayerthorpe under the Fatality Inquiries Act of Alberta, before Assistant Chief Judge Daniel R. Pahl. The inquiry began on January 11, 2011, in Stony Plain Provincial Court. The lengthy period between the killings and the inquiry was because the Fatality Inquiries Act provides that inquiries are to be stayed pending determination of criminal charges in relation to the deaths.

The inquiry produced a 26-page report, concluding that the deaths of the four officers were homicides and the death of Roszko was a suicide. The report provides a detailed factual account of the killings, and also made eight recommendations to prevent a similar event from occurring in the future.

=== Upgrade to RCMP weapons ===
On October 21, 2011, the Commissioner of the RCMP, William J. S. Elliott, announced that the RCMP officers would have a new weapon at their disposition, the C8 Rifle. One of the main conclusions from the Fatality Inquiry that led to this result was the fact that the officers who were involved in the events did not have the appropriate weapon to face someone with a semi-automatic rifle, as stated in the Fatalities Inquiry.

== In popular culture ==
- Corb Lund referenced this tragedy in a verse of the title track to his album Horse Soldier! Horse Soldier!
- KO referenced the tragedy in his song "The Ballad Of Jimmy Roscoe".
- On February 10, 2008, CTV aired a feature-length made-for-TV movie called Mayerthorpe, directed by Ken Girotti.

== See also ==
- David Wynn
- Moncton shootings
- Spiritwood Incident
- List of law enforcement officers killed in the line of duty in Canada
