= Agreed statement =

Concept in US law

An agreed statement, in US law, is an agreement between two parties to a lawsuit or an appeal of a judgment. The agreements are limited to cases of the dispute being a question of legal interpretation rather than a dispute concerning the facts of a case.
