= R. Leslie Jackson =

R. Leslie Jackson was the Chief Justice of the Provincial Court of New Brunswick until 14 January 2014, when he was continued in office as a supernumerary.

Jackson received his LL.B. in 1970 from the University of New Brunswick. His time in private practice ended on 7 November 1997 when he was created a Provincial Court justice. He was promoted to the position of Associate Chief Justice on 9 January 2006.

== Notable cases ==
- The release, as the result of an application by the CBC and the Telegraph-Journal, of search warrant and other documents in the Richard Oland homicide, although the publication ban was partially maintained.
- The 2017 labour dispute between the RCMP and Employment Canada, which occurred as the result of Justin Bourque's murderous actions.
