= Provincial Court of New Brunswick =

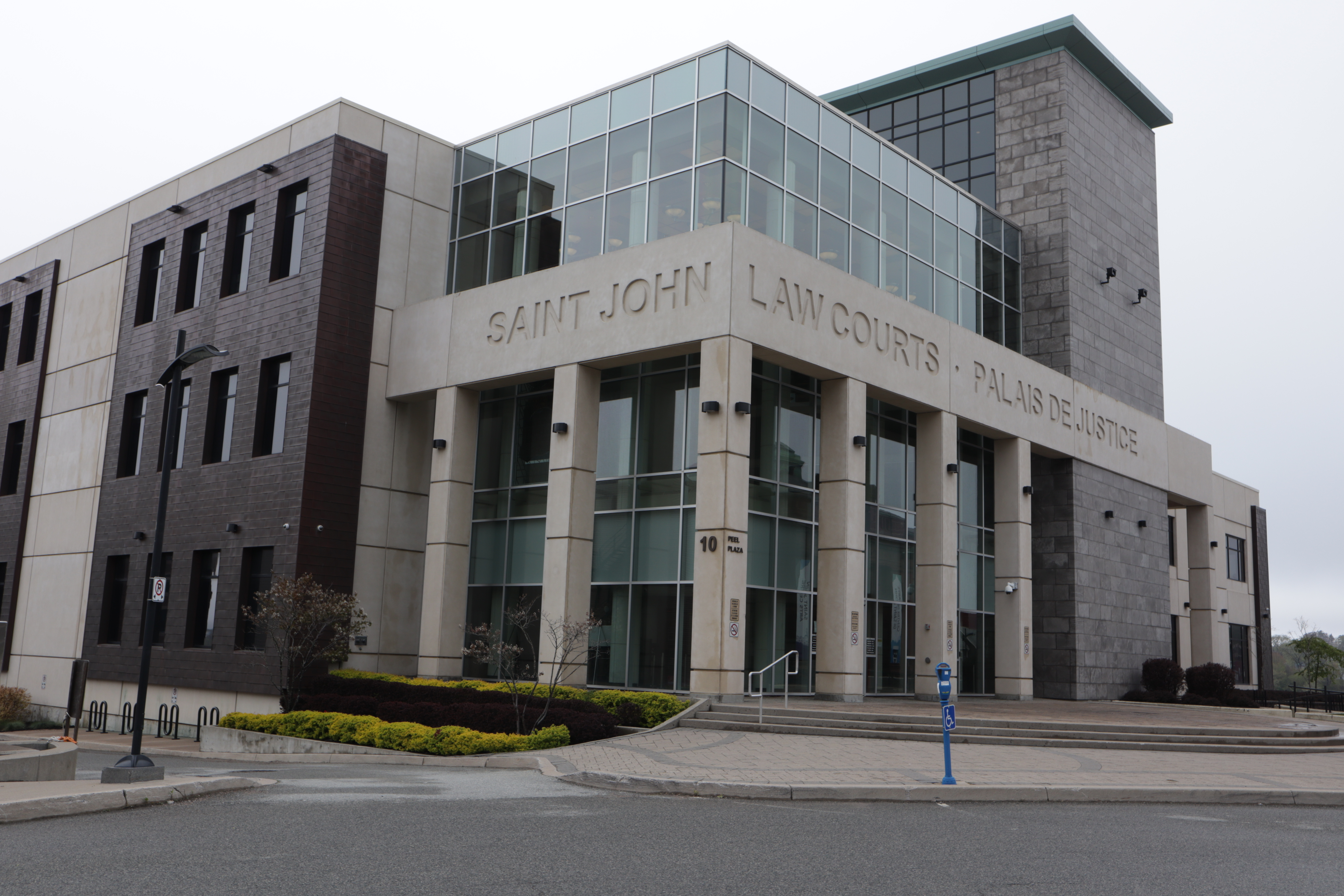
The courthouse in Saint John

The Provincial Court of New Brunswick (French: Cour provinciale du Nouveau-Brunswick) is the lower trial court of the province of New Brunswick. It hears cases relating to criminal law and other statutes. The court system of New Brunswick also has a Mental Health Court located in Saint John. The provincial bench has 22 judges, 9 supernumerary judges (as of February 2018), and 2 per diem judges.

== Judges of the Provincial Court of New Brunswick ==
=== Current Judges ===
Name	Location	Date Appointed	Appointed By	Prior Position(s)
Chief Judge Pierre W. Arseneault	Moncton	1988; 2006 (ACJ); 2014 (CJ)	Liberal	McIntyre & McIntyre (1980 to 1988); D. Paul Hayes (1979 to 1980)
Associate Chief Judge Mary Jane Richards	Fredericton			
Judge Brigitte Sivret	Bathurst	2007	Liberal	
Judge Ronald LeBlanc	Bathurst			
Judge Kenneth Oliver	Burton	2012	PC	Crown Prosecutor
Judge Pierre F. Dubé	Burton			
Judge Suzanne C. Bernard	Campbellton			
Judge Yvette Finn	Caraquet			
Judge Brigitte Volpé	Edmundston	2012	PC	Private Practice
Judge Julian Dickson	Fredericton			
Judge Irwin E. Lampert	Moncton			
Judge Jolène Richard	Moncton	2008	Liberal	Stewart McKelvey
Judge D. Troy Sweet	Moncton	2012	PC	Private Practice
Judge Paul E. Duffie	Moncton	2008	Liberal	Provincial MLA; Mayor of Grand Falls
Judge Denise A. LeBlanc	Moncton	2016		McInnes Cooper
Judge Cameron H. Gunn	Fredericton			Executive Director, Public Prosecution Services
Judge Marco Robert Cloutier	Saint John	2013	PC	Private Practice
Judge W. Andrew LeMesurier	Saint John			
Judge Richard Andrew Palmer	Saint John			
Judge Henrik G. Tonning	Saint John			
Judge Éric P. Sonier	Tracadie-Sheila	2016	Liberal	
Judge Brian McLean	Woodstock			

Supernumerary

Name	Location	Date Appointed	Appointed By	Prior Position(s)
Judge R. Leslie Jackson	Woodstock	1997 - 2014 (J); 2006 (ACJ)	Liberal	Private Practice
Judge Anne Dugas-Horsman	Moncton	2001	PC	Private Practice
Judge Camille A. Dumas	Bathurst			
Judge Donald J. LeBlanc	Tracadie-Sheila			
Judge David C. Walker	Saint John			
Judge James G. McNamee (per diem)	Saint John			
Judge Anne Jeffries (per diem)	Saint John			
Judge William McCarroll	Saint John			
Judge Alfred H. Brien	Saint John			
Judge Denis T. Lordon	Miramichi			
Judge Joseph C. Michaud	Moncton			
Judge J. Camille Vautour	Moncton			

== Previous Judges ==
- Judge Fred Ferguson
- Judge S.M. Hutchinson
- Judge P.L. Cumming
- Judge T. Denis Lordon
- Judge Murray F. Cain
