= David Wynn =

Canadian police constable (1972–2015)

Const. David Wynn
- Born: October 18, 1972; Newcastle, New Brunswick, Canada
- Died: January 21, 2015 (aged 42); St. Albert, Alberta, Canada
- Cause of death: Murder
- Occupation: Police Officer
- Employer: RCMP
- Spouse: Shelly MacInnis-Wynn
- Children: 3

David Matthew Wynn (October 18, 1972 – January 21, 2015) was a Canadian police officer in the St. Albert RCMP in Alberta. David Wynn was shot and killed by Shawn Rehn in St. Albert's Apex Casino during a routine license plate check. He is the namesake of a defeated bill, Wynn's Law, that would have made it more difficult for suspects to make bail if they had a criminal history. David Wynn was posthumously awarded a bravery award by the RCMP commissioner.

== Background ==
Wynn was born in Newcastle, New Brunswick in 1972. Before becoming a police officer, Wynn was a paramedic for Emergency Health Services in Bridgewater, NS from between 1996 and 2009. In 2009 he joined the St. Albert RCMP.

== Death ==
Const. David Wynn was shot in the head during a routine license plate check on January 17, 2015. He succumbed to his injuries four days later on January 21.

=== Apex Casino shooting ===
On January 17, 2015, Const. Wynn was at the Apex Casino in St. Albert, Alberta. He had been performing a routine check of the license plates in the parking lot — a common task on a slow night such as that one — when he found a plate that was not registered to the truck it was on. Suspecting vehicle theft, he went inside the casino to check the video footage. A second officer, Aux. Const. Derek Bond, was called in to help review the tape.

At around 3 am, the two officers identified the man driving the truck, who was still in the casino at the time. They chased after the man, who fled. When Wynn tried to grab the suspect by the arm, the man turned around and shot him in the head. Bond attempted to subdue the shooter, but in the struggle was shot in the torso and right arm. The shooter fled the casino to an unoccupied home, where he shot himself. Police found the body shortly after when they identified the stolen vehicle outside the home. The man was identified the next day as Shawn Rehn, a 34 year old career criminal. Later that day, it was announced that Const. Wynn was not expected to survive.

On January 19, Wynn's family gathered to say their final goodbyes. Over the next several days, words of support came from across the country. Wynn was taken off life support on January 21, 2015.

=== Funeral ===
The funeral saw attendance numbers in the thousands. Among notable attendees were then Prime Minister Stephen Harper and then Alberta Premier Jim Prentice. The service was held at Servus Credit Union Place, and was broadcast across the country.

== Wynn's Law ==
Wynn's Law was a proposed piece of legislation that ultimately was not passed. Bill S-217 was defeated in the House of Commons on June 14, 2017 under Justin Trudeau's government. The bill was introduced by Senator Bob Runciman on February 3, 2016, and was sponsored by MP Michael Cooper. The bill was to make changes to the Criminal Code that would have made it mandatory to disclose a suspect's criminal history during a bail hearing. It was named after Wynn because his killer Shawn Rehn had been out on bail at the time of the shootings, despite having many previous charges. It was argued that these previous charges should have been disclosed at Rehn's bail hearing, and that such a change might have prevented Wynn's death. The bill was championed by Wynn's wife Shelly, who at times through the process voiced her displeasure at the Liberal government, who were accused of opposing the bill on political grounds. The liberal government had previously stated that they would not support the law. Since this law was defeated at least seven law enforcement officers in Canada have been killed by people with extensive criminal records.

== Awards ==
=== Bravery award ===
Const. David Wynn was posthumously given a bravery award by the RCMP Commissioner in March, 2019. The award recognized both him and Auxiliary Const. Derek Bond for engaging an armed suspect after being fired upon. Two of Wynn's sons, Nathan and Matthew, accepted the award on his behalf.

== See also ==
- Mayerthorpe tragedy
- Moncton shooting
- Spiritwood Incident
- List of law enforcement officers killed in the line of duty in Canada
