= List of killings by law enforcement officers in Canada =

This is a list of people who died as a result of an interaction with law enforcement officers in Canada. The list includes deaths caused by officers both on and off duty, and does not discriminate by method or motivation.

This list is incomplete; there are no official statistics on fatal shootings by law enforcement officers in Canada, though the range had previously been estimated to be between 15 and 25 per year. In 2018, The CBC published "Deadly Force", an investigative report described as "the first country-wide database of every person who died or was killed during a police intervention", which documented 461 fatal police encounters in Canada between 2000 and 2017, suggesting the average is closer to 26 people a year. "Deadly Force" also recorded an increasing average yearly number of police-involved deaths over time. At the moment, Statistics Canada only tracks fatal police shootings if the officer involved is criminally charged.

== List ==
=== Before 1980 ===
| Date | Name (age) of deceased | Province or Territory City | Police Force | Description of Incident |
|---|---|---|---|---|
| 1900-05-21 | Two unknown men | Ontario (Berlin) | | Two workmen were killed by police with sabres during a workers' strike. Fifty other people were injured and 103 arrests made. |
| c. 1928 | McKee, Carl "Gunner" | Manitoba (Winnipeg) | | McKee was killed by Det. Sgt. Charles McIver after shooting McIver while being arrested for a string of drug store robberies. The Winnipeg Evening Tribune later reported that McIver had been given a medal for his bravery facing McKee. |
| 1932-02-17 | Albert Johnson | Yukon (Eagle River) | | The true identity of Johnson has never been established. He shot a Royal Canadian Mounted Police (RCMP) and, after an extended manhunt across the Northwest Territories and Yukon, was killed in a shootout with police on the Eagle River, Yukon. |
| 1936-05-23 | Norman Ryan (41) | Ontario (Sarnia) | Sarnia Police Service | Ryan, a Toronto gangster known to have killed six people was shot and killed by Sarnia police in a gunfight at a liquor store that also killed Constable Jack Lewis. |
| 1944-04-04 | Silver, Martin | Manitoba (Winnipeg) | Winnipeg Police Service | Silver, a career criminal with arrests in Ottawa, Montreal, and Toronto, was suspected of involvement in at least 60 burglaries in Winnipeg. During one burglary, he shot Sgt. Major E. Sewell and Dtv. James Ayres. Fleeing by car, he was eventually cornered on foot at a nursing home by Cst. Alex Jamieson. Silver threatened Jamieson with his gun, leading to a shootout where Silver fired four shots and Jamieson returned five. The final shot from Jamieson struck Silver in the chest, killing him. |
| 1953-11-29 | Belfon, Garfield (14) | Ontario (Toronto) | Toronto Police Service | Cst. Edwinn George Barkley shot Belfon in a College Street building's basement, where Belfon was hiding with friends. Belfon died from a neck wound en route to the hospital. During Barkley's manslaughter trial, he claimed the shooting was accidental, caused by a falling box. However, Frank Fuss, one of Belfon's friends present, disputed this account, stating the basement was lit and no box fell on Barkley |
| 1957-12-03 | Gallaway, John (81) | Ontario (Toronto) | | Retired Saskatchewan public school inspector struck and killed by a police car driven by Insp. Howard Cramp. |
| 1965-03-01 (circa) | Nicholls, Richard George (24) | Ontario (Windsor) | | Shot and killed by Const. Craig Robinson, after taking part in a burglary on a pharmacy. |
| 1965-07-11 | Drake, Ronald Gordon (23) | Ontario (London) | London Police Service | Drake was shot and killed by Const. Brian Potsans after stealing sweaters from a menswear shop. |
| 1967-03-03 | Levasseur, Antoine (25) | Quebec (Ste-Véronique) | | Levasseur was shot and killed by police after reportedly committing a robbery on a credit union. He had recently escaped from a jail in Montmagny. |
| 1967-09-16 | Proietti, Monica (27) | Quebec (Montreal) | | Proietti, a bank robber better known as "Machine Gun Molly", was shot by police following a high speed chase. |
| 1967-10-20 | Murdock, Richard (30) | Quebec (Montreal) | | Murdock was shot and killed by Const. Michel Brosseau after being involved in a standoff with police in which he was armed with a machine gun. |
| 1969 | Unknown (19) | Saskatchewan (Regina) | | A teenager was shot and killed by Regina police during a stake-out. |
| 1970-07-03 | Kinghorn, Edgar (19) | Quebec (Laflèche, Quebec) | Lafleche Police | Police arrived on the scene after Kinghorn, who did not seem to be in a stable mental state and declared himself to be Jesus Christ, refused to pay for a pack of cigarettes at a gas station. He carried a long sabre which he swung at police before being shot in the head by Const. Jean Marc Legros. A coroner's inquest determined that the officer acted in self-defence but that police should be given better marksman training. The officer had been trained to aim for the legs but testified that his firearms training had only been 90 minutes long. |
| 1970-12-12 | Spencer, Roy | British Columbia (Prince George) | RCMP | Spencer, the father of NHL player Brian Spencer, was shot and killed by police after he held up CKPG Radio/TV, angry that they were not airing his son's game. |
| 1972 | Unknown | British Columbia (Vancouver) | | An officer's gun went off while he was struggling to arrest a suspect. The officer was charged with manslaughter, but the charge was dismissed against him in a preliminary inquiry. |
| 1974-12-20 | Gagnon, Phillip Laurier (26) | Alberta (Calgary) | Calgary Police Service | Gagnon, during a siege, fired hundreds of rounds at police, killing Dtv. Boyd Davidson and wounding others. The standoff ended when police, with assistance from CFB Calgary, used an armoured personnel carrier to demolish Gagnon's hideout. Gagnon was then shot and killed by police. |
| 1975 | Unknown | British Columbia (Vancouver) | | An officer's shot and killed a suspect during a struggle to arrest a suspect. The officer was charged with second-degree murder, but was acquitted at trial. |
| 1975-01-24 | Blass, Richard | Quebec (Montreal) | | Blass, a Montreal gangster, was shot by police when he approached them holding what appeared to be a gun. Some sources said that it was actually a black sock. |
| 1975-04-28 | Lajoie, Michel (33) | Quebec (Shawinigan) | | Lajoie was shot and killed by police during a robbery at a Banque Canadienne Nationale. |
| 1975-04-28 | Giroux, Albery (22) | Quebec (Shawinigan) | | Giroux was shot and killed by police during a robbery at a Banque Canadienne Nationale. |
| 1975-04-28 | Essiambre, Donat (54) | Quebec (Shawinigan) | | Essiambre was shot and killed by police during a robbery at a Banque Canadienne Nationale. |
| 1975-07-27 | Rose, Donald Wayne (29) | Alberta (Edmonton) | Edmonton Police Service | Rose was shot and killed by Const. Gary Tkachuk outside his home after he did not follow orders to drop his gun. The police were investigating a liquor store robbery. Police reported Rose had previously expressed a wish "to commit suicide and [use] the police department to do it." |
| 1976-01-11 | Savoy, Francis Joseph | Ontario (Toronto) | | Savoy was shot and killed by police after taking a hostage. |
| 1976-05-15 | Slawvey, John (38) | Quebec (Montreal) | MUC Police | Slawvey, who was a suspect in the Brink's bank robbery of March 30, 1976, was shot and killed by Det. Sgt. Andre Savard and four other policemen in an apartment building in Montreal's west end. |
| 1976-05-27 | Tremblay, Marcel (49) | Quebec (near Quebec City) | Sûreté du Québec | Tremblay, a suspect in a "holdup conspiracy" police were tipped off to, was shot and killed alongside Clement Parent after they allegedly opened fire at police. |
| 1976-05-27 | Parent, Clement (23) | Quebec (near Quebec City) | Sûreté du Québec | Parent, a suspect in a "holdup conspiracy" police were tipped off to, was shot and killed alongside Marcel Tremblay after they allegedly opened fire at police. |
| 1976-08-28 | Holmes, Rosaire Armand (27) | Alberta (Grande Prairie) | RCMP | Holmes, who was drunk at the time, was shot and killed by police after firing at passersby from his home, killing one person and injuring others. |
| 1976-09-16 | Blanchet, Gerard (23) | Quebec (Montreal) | MUC Police | Blanchet was killed after his car collided with a police car responding to a call. |
| 1977-08-15 | Misztal, Alexander (51) | Ontario (Toronto) | Toronto Police Service | Misztal was shot and killed by Const. Christopher Bailey after brandishing a toy gun at him. |
| 1978-08-07 | Nattinen, Hans (66) | Ontario (Toronto) | Toronto Police Service | Nattinen, a Finnish immigrant, was shot and killed by the Emergency Task Force after reportedly pointing a gun, which was later found to be unloaded, at them. Police had come to his building after receiving a call "in clear English" that hostages had been taken. Nattinen's sister later questioned whether her brother, who spoke with an accent, had made the call and whether he understood what was happening, as he was extremely intoxicated when he died. An inquest found that the officer had acted in self-defence. |
| 1978-08-08 | Evans, Andrew "Buddy" (24) | Ontario (Toronto) | Toronto Police Service | Evans, a Black man originally from East Preston, NS, was shot and killed by Const. John Clark at a discotheque, after he allegedly hit Clark with the officer's own nightstick. His death sparked protests in Toronto. The ambulance dispatcher who responded to Evans' death was later demoted after transcripts revealed him referring to Evans by a racial slur and saying "he won't be missed". Clark was cleared of any wrongdoing by an inquest. |
| 1978-08-22 | Reid, Paul (16) | Ontario (Toronto) | Toronto Police Service | Reid, was shot and killed by Toronto police after holding a 15-year-old girl hostage for 7 hours. He had recently escaped from the Brampton Adult Training Centre, which his father criticized in the press for allowing him to "just walk away". |
| 1978-11-11 | Wawryniuk, Michael (73) | Ontario (Toronto) | Toronto Police Service | Wawryniuk, who had a history of mental health issues known to the police, was shot and killed by Const. David Keates after he lunged at him with kitchen knives. An inquest found that Keates acted in self-defence. |
| 1979-05-08 | Elie, William (23) | Ontario (Scarborough) | | Elie was shot and killed by police in a LCBO parking lot. He was holding what was later revealed to be a toy gun, which he pointed at officers. He matched the description of a man who had reportedly threatened someone with a gun earlier that day. A jury found that the police had "no alternative" but to shoot Elie. The entire incident last between 5 and 10 seconds. |
| 1979-06-11 | Torcato, Aquilino | Ontario (Toronto) | Toronto Police Service | Torcato, a Portuguese immigrant, father of two and owner of an auto shop with a history of alcoholism was shot and killed by Const. Clark of the Emergency Task Force. Police were called to the neighbourhood because of a disturbance. After a shot was fired by Torcato, who was drunk at the time, from inside his house a long standoff ensued. Eventually police entered the house and found Torcato with a gun which he pointed at Clark, who shot and killed him. An inquest found that Clark acted in self-defence |
| 1979-08-26 | Johnson, Albert (35) | Ontario (Toronto) | Toronto Police Service | Johnson, a Jamaican immigrant who suffered from mental illness, was shot and killed by police in his home in front of his young daughter. His death sparked protests in the Greater Toronto Area. Two officers were charged with manslaughter but eventually acquitted. |
| 1979-08-30 | Enns, Lyle Dean (18) | Manitoba (Sidney) | RCMP | Enns was shot and killed at his family's farm by Const. Wiley Grimm, after he reportedly killed a police dog which was set loose on him. The case attracted some attention in the press and was discussed in the Manitoba Legislature. |

=== 1980–1999 ===
| Date | Name (age) of deceased | Province or Territory City | Police Force | Description of Incident |
|---|---|---|---|---|
| 1980-07-27 | Hollett, Albert (36) | Nova Scotia (Dartmouth) | | Hollett died after an altercation with two police officers on the bridge between Halifax and Dartmouth. Both officers were charged with second-degree murder: one was acquitted and the other was convicted of manslaughter. |
| 1984 | (38) | Saskatchewan (Regina) | | A man armed with a gun who wrote a suicide note before confronting Regina police was shot and killed. |
| 1987-11-11 | Griffin, Anthony | Quebec (Montreal) | | Griffin was shot by Constable Allan Gosset while fleeing. In February 1988 Gosset was found not guilty of manslaughter. |
| 1988-03-09 | Harper, J.J. | Manitoba (Winnipeg) | | During an altercation between police and Harper, Constable Robert Cross shot and killed Harper. It was initially ruled an accident; however, a strong public outcry lead to an inquiry (the Aboriginal Justice Inquiry). The inquiry eventually concluded that Cross had used excessive force in the fatal confrontation. |
| 1988-06-30 | Coghlan, Greg (23) | British Columbia (Vancouver) | Vancouver Police Department | Coghlan was in crisis following his cousin's suicide a few months earlier. Before he was shot and killed by police he threatened to stab himself with a butcher knife while drunk. When police arrived on the scene they told him to freeze, and Coghlan put his arms above his head, but then stumbled due to his intoxication and was shot. The coroner's inquest called his death a "victim-precipitated homicide". |
| 1988-07-19 | Deiana, Mario (44) | British Columbia (Vancouver) | Vancouver Police Department | Deiana was shot and killed by Const. Nigel Myatt at a rooming house while wielding a butcher knife after stabbing a 65-year-old caretaker to death. Deiana had been discharged from psychiatric care the day before. The coroner's jury investigating his death recommended that police adopt pepper spray as an alternative to firearms. |
| 1988-08-09 | Donaldson, Lester (44) | Ontario (Toronto) | | Donaldson suffered from paranoid schizophrenia and threatened officers with a knife. |
| 1988-08-26 | Post, Thomas Maxwell (37) | Ontario (Toronto) | York Regional Police | Post was shot and killed by police after a 4.5 hour standoff in which he took his girlfriend hostage with a knife and stabbed a police officer. Police also used tear gas prior to shooting him. The jury at the inquest found that the police showed "calm and restraint" and commended their actions. |
| 1988-12-08 | Lawson, Michael Wade (17) | Ontario (Mississauga) | | Lawson was shot by two police officers when he tried to drive a stolen car into officers. Two police officers were charged with manslaughter and aggravated assault, and were found not guilty in April 1992. |
| 1988-12-31 | Cholette, Joseph Ronald Paul (38) | British Columbia (Vancouver) | Vancouver Police Department | Cholette was shot and killed by Const. Skip McLean during a suspected robbery at a motel liquor store after he shot Const. Les Yeo. He had recently escaped from the minimum-security Ferndale Institution. The jury at the coroner's inquest determined that the officers had acted "legally and prudently" and commended them for their actions. |
| 1989 | Unknown male | British Columbia (Vancouver) | | An officer's firearm went off during the pursuit of a suspect. The officer was charged with "careless use of a firearm", but the officer was acquitted at trial. |
| 1990-04-09 | Leslie, Presley (25) | Quebec (Montreal) | | Leslie, a Jamaican immigrant, was shot by an officer after police came to the Thunderdome disco in downtown Montreal to respond to a brawl that took place there. Witnesses said Presley had a gun in his hand. |
| 1990-05-22 | Henry, Stanley Samuel (34) | British Columbia (Vancouver) | Vancouver Police Department | Henry was struck and killed by police car driven by Const. Len Nuttall responding to an emergency call with lights but no sirens. In response to the incident a police Sergeant stated that sirens were sometimes left off "so as not to alert people (suspects) a police car is coming." |
| 1990-10-25 | McKinnon, Paul (14) | Quebec (Montreal) | SPVM | In 1990, 14-year-old Paul McKinnon was struck and killed by a speeding police cruiser driven by Const. Serge Markovic. He was crossing the street to catch his bus home after school when Markovic ran a red light while responding to a call involving a possibly suicidal man. He was driving between 90 – 122 km/h in a 50 km/h zone with lights but no sirens. Markovic ran red lights at an Institute for the Blind as well as a high school and university crossing. Markovic's role in McKinnon's death was covered in the CBC podcast "Sorry About the Kid" which was hosted by the victim's brother Alex McKinnon. |
| 1991 | Gardner, Vincent | Ontario (Nepean) | | Gardner was shot by Constable John Monette during a botched drug raid. Monette was charged with manslaughter but found not guilty of the charge. Nepean police said Monette mistook Gardner's guitar for a gun. |
| 1991-01-02 | Hodgins, Kenneth Frederick (37) | British Columbia (Vancouver) | Vancouver Police Department | Hodgins was shot and killed by Const. Edward Eviston after he pointed a gun in his direction. His death was later cited in the press as an example of the police's need for semiautomatic weapons. |
| 1991-07-03 | François, Marcellus (24) | Quebec (Montreal) | | Francois, mistaken for an attempted murder suspect, was shot by a SWAT team sergeant while driving a Pontiac after leaving a surveilled apartment. Officers reportedly used racial slurs over the radio. Francois did not match the suspect's description, differing in height, build, and hairstyle. |
| 1992-05-02 | Lawrence, Raymond (22) | Ontario | | Suspected of being a drug dealer, Jamaican immigrant Lawrence was shot by police while reportedly brandishing a knife after a chase. |
| 1992-05-02 | Posse, Daniel (22) | British Columbia (West Vancouver) | | A West Vancouver police officer shot and killed Daniel Possee during a cannabis raid which netted an ounce. Posse had been holding a pellet gun when officers entered without identifying themselves. The officer's name was never released. |
| 1992-03-23 | Rioux, John (37) | Ontario (Chatham) | | Rioux died after struggling with three officers who followed him home when he refused to stop after being caught speeding. Police said Rioux threatened officers with a sledgehammer when they tried to arrest him. Constable Ron Trick was charged with manslaughter and was found guilty. He was later acquitted on appeal. |
| 1992-08-09 | Sabatino, Dominic (32) | Ontario (Toronto) | | Sabatino, who suffered from schizophrenia, was shot after threatening an officer with a baseball bat. |
| 1992-11-07 | Carruthers, Cameron A. (19) | Ontario (Chatham) | | Cameron Carruthers was shot and killed as he lunged at two Chatham police officers called to a house break-in near Chatham's Public General Hospital in the middle of the night. He was stabbing himself with a kitchen knife when police arrived at the house. Carruthers had broken into the home shortly after he walked out of the PGH psychiatric ward. He was there voluntarily but didn't officially discharge himself, according to a statement released by Ontario's Special Investigations Unit. The SIU's investigation found that officers involved acted in a "professional and necessary manner". |
| 1993-01-01 | Kelly, Trevor | Quebec (Montreal) | | Shot in the back near his apartment on Mountain Sights Avenue after police tried to arrest him for threatening them; police said he brandished a potato knife. After an SQ investigation, Station 31 officers Richard Massé and Sylvain Benoît were exonerated. |
| 1993-01-21 | McDonald, Alexander (26) | Saskatchewan (Regina) | | Shot by police after brandishing a knife. |
| 1993-04-20 | Coley, Ian Clifford (21) | Ontario | | Shot by two officers in a car that was under surveillance as part of an operation against illegal firearms. |
| 1993-12-14 | Barnabé, Richard | Quebec (Montreal) | | Beaten into a coma in his cell at Station 44 while supposedly resisting a search. Barnabé, a taxi driver, was distraught that evening and wanted to speak to someone. He arrived at a church on Rue Sauriol and when no one answered, he broke a window of the church, apparently in frustration at being denied visiting rights to see his son during the Christmas holidays. He led police on a car chase through the suburbs until he was arrested outside the home of his brother, himself a Montreal policeman. He had been arrested for breaking the church window. He died in hospital May 2, 1996, never having regained consciousness. The result: After an SQ investigation, criminal charges were brought against several officers; in 1995, one was acquitted and four others - Pierre Bergeron, André Lapointe and Michel Vadeboncoeur, all of Station 44, and Louis Samson, of Station 1, were sentenced to jail terms to be served on weekends or community service. |
| 1993-12-24 | Michele, Robert Thomas (31) | British Columbia (Lillooet) | RCMP | Michele crashed during a pursuit. He was shot once by an officer as he advanced towards police carrying a rifle. |
| 1994-09-29 | Moses, Albert (41) | Ontario (Toronto) | | Moses, who had a history of mental illness, was shot after attacking an officer with a hammer. |
| 1995-03-06 | Romanelli, Paolo (23) | Quebec (Montreal) | | Romanelli, an emotionally disturbed man, was shot twice, in the back and chest, after stabbing an officer who'd come to his door on Viau St., answering a 911 call. The shooting followed a standoff in which Romanelli barricaded himself in his home. After two SQ investigations and an inquest, Mario Boucher, Robert Gagnon, and three other Station 54 officers were exonerated. |
| 1995-03-31 | Piche, Floyd (28) | Saskatchewan (Prince Albert) | | Piche brandished a knife near an officer and was shot. |
| 1995-05-31 | Suazo, Martin Omar | Quebec (Montreal) | | Shot in the head while kneeling to be handcuffed on St. Laurent Boulevard. Suazo had been picked up on suspicion of shoplifting a pair of jeans. The officer said his gun went off by accident. A police ethics commission investigation finds Station 33 officer Michel Garneau guilty of improper use of a firearm and suspends him for 45 days. A coroner concluded the death was accidental. Suazo's mother obtained a $3,000 out-of-court settlement. Lt. Pablo Palacios (also involved in the Marcellus François affair in 1991) is accused of covering up evidence, but is exonerated in 2004. |
| 1995-06-26 | Ferraro, Philippe | Quebec (Rivière-des-Prairies) | | Shot in the stomach with three rubber bullets, after barricading himself in his Rivière-des-Prairies house during a family dispute. After an SQ probe, SWAT team officer Michael Wilson was exonerated. |
| 1995-09-07 | O'Brien George, Anthony "Dudley" | Ontario (Strathroy) | | Shot and killed by Acting Ontario Provincial Police Sergeatnt Kenneth Deane in Sept. 1995 while peacefully protesting against the slow progress in resolving a land claim concerning the 1942 take over of Stony Point First Nation reserve and another land claim involving the Ipperwash Provincial Park. Kenneth Deane was eventually convicted of "Criminal negligence causing death" but served no jail time. The Ipperwash Inquiry called after the Mike Harris Progressive Conservatives were beaten by the McGuinty Liberals ended over a decade later. |
| 1996 | Suleman, Faraz (16) | Ontario (Toronto) | | Suleman was shot after a car chase as police tried to arrest him on robbery charges relating to a carjacking. Detective Robert Wiche was charged with manslaughter but the charge was later dismissed at a preliminary court hearing. |
| 1996-01-10 | Barnett, Tommy Anthony (22) | Ontario (Toronto) | | Barnett was shot while wielding a sword. |
| 1996-01-28 | Cyr, Denise (20) | Saskatchewan (Regina) | | Stole two handguns and fired at the owner. After police arrived on scene, she returned and fired another round. Police officers returned fire. |
| 1996-03-02 | Benteau, Nicholas | Newfoundland (Point May) | | Benteau was shot by an RCMP officer during a domestic disturbance. |
| 1996-03-14 | Bramwell, Andrew | Ontario (Toronto) | | shot to death by constable Andy Kis in the Jane and Finch area. The officer fired three bullets into Andrew's lower back and one in the back of one of his thighs. An unfired Glock pistol was recovered from the scene. Officer cleared of criminal wrongdoing by the SIU. |
| 1996-06-11 | Williams, Wayne (24) | Ontario (Toronto) | | Williams suffered from schizophrenia. He approached officers holding a knife. |
| 1997 | Dawson, Hugh | Ontario (Toronto) | | Was shot nine times after he reversed his car into a family of five in order to escape police. |
| 1997-02-20 | Wai-Hong Yu, Edmond | Ontario (Toronto) | | Yu was shot by a police officer after wielding a small hammer on a bus. |
| 1998 | Romagnuolo, Tony | Ontario (Toronto) | | A fight broke out between the Romangulo family and the police after they were attempting to arrest one of Tony's sons for criminal threats. Officer Martin claimed that the father and one of the suspect's brothers, Rocco, were attempting to gain control of his gun. He then fired his sidearm at both of them. |
| 1998-09-07 | Timmers, Harley (23) | Yukon (Whitehorse) | | Harley Timmers, a carjacking suspect, put an officer in a chokehold, and the officer shot the suspect. Timmers would die two days later in a Vancouver hospital. |
| 1998-09-10 | Engdahl, Josh (16) | Saskatchewan (Regina) | | Engdahl had a knife in his hands and was shot by Regina police. |
| 1999-12-31 | Musaka, Henry (26) | Ontario (Toronto) | | Musaka, carrying a sick infant and armed with a pellet gun, was shot after he took a doctor hostage in a Toronto emergency room. |
| 1999-12-31 | Varley, Darren (26) | Alberta (Pincher Creek) | RCMP | During booking at the police station, Varley removed Ferguson's bulletproof vest, accessing his pistol. In the ensuing struggle, Ferguson fired twice, grazing Varley's abdomen and piercing his skull. Varley died after being airlifted to Calgary. Ferguson was convicted of manslaughter and ultimately served four years in prison, following two years of house arrest during the trial. |

=== 2000s ===
| Date | Name (age) of deceased | Province or Territory City | Police Force | Description of Incident |
|---|---|---|---|---|
| 2000-04-11 | Alphonse, Paulsey "Paul" (67) | British Columbia (Williams Lake) | RCMP | Alphonse was a Secwepemc man who was beaten by RCMP officers and later died of his injuries, including broken ribs, a head injury and a boot print on his chest in hospital. |
| 2000-07-29 | Graham, Mark Norman (38) | Ontario (Bradford) | South Simcoe Police Service | South Simcoe police believed Graham may have been connected to a shooting outside a tavern and pursued him. He was shot when he reached into his coat for what was later shown to be a sawed-off rifle. His shooting occurred in front of many witnesses at a crowded Tim Hortons. The officers were later cleared of any wrongdoing. |
| 2000-08-09 | Vass, Otto (55) | Ontario (Toronto) | | Otto Vass was a father of five who suffered from bipolar disorder and schizophrenia. Four TPS constables in Parkdale beat him to death after he punched one of them. His death was attributed to cardiac arrest due to acute mania and "excited delirium", a condition not recognized by the AMA, APA or WHO. Four Toronto police constables, Robert Lemaitre, Phillip Duncan, Nam Le and Filippo Bevilacqua, were charged with manslaughter, and were all found not guilty of the charge. The story of his death was later made into a play called Out the Window, by witness Liza Balkan. |
| 2000-08-21 | Cujko, Mladen (33) | British Columbia | | Cujko was in distress when police arrived, reportedly "running into traffic and jumping into a woman's car". Cujko was put in the back of an RCMP police cruiser and was to be taken for psychiatric evaluation. When Cujko kicked the back window of a police car he was subdued by police and paramedics, lost consciousness shortly after being handcuffed and died, despite paramedics administering CPR. |
| 2000-08-26 | Reid, Norman (44) | Newfoundland (Little Catalina) | RCMP | Reid was shot in his yard when he rushed towards an officer with an axe after threatening to kill him. |
| 2000-10-16 | Power, Daryl (23) | Newfoundland (Corner Brook) | RCMP | Power was shot while armed and acting aggressively, outside his mother's home. |
| 2000-10-22 | Berg, Jeffrey Michael (37) | British Columbia (Vancouver) | | Officer used force against Berg while arresting him following a home invasion; Berg died in hospital two days later due to his injuries. The officer was acquitted of abuse of authority in the incident. |
| 2001-05-20 | McMillan, Keldon | Saskatchewan (Saskatoon) | RCMP | RCMP officers responded to a domestic dispute at McMillan's house. He got into his truck and initiated a vehicle pursuit. The pursuit ended in Wakaw, where shots were exchanged between officers and McMillan. One K9 dog was killed in the incident. |
| 2001-07-10 | Crowe, Vernon (32) | Saskatchewan (Regina) | Regina Police Service | Vernon Crowe, an Indigenous man, was eating at a soup kitchen when he had an epileptic seizure. While treating him in an ambulance, a paramedic stated that he became combative and placed two calls to the Regina Police Service to help restrain Crowe. Police arrived and, after being bitten and headbutted, pepper strayed Crowe who was then sedated and handcuffed face-down on a stretcher. Moments later, as Crowe stopped struggling, the handcuffs were removed and he was found to have died. |
| 2002-03-11 | Lamer, Daniel (37) | Ontario | Ontario Provincial Police | Daniel Lamer was shot and killed after he shot at OPP officers during a traffic stop. Both Lamer and his passenger were members of the Hells Angels, and are suspected to have been travelling to kill members of the rival Bandidos gang. |
| 2002-06-23 | Blentzas, Nicholas | Ontario (Toronto) | | Blentzas began to experience mental distress after the death of his sister. He was locked out of his apartment, bludgeoning the door with a fire extinguisher. Upon their arrival, he informed police that he was being treated for a psychiatric illness. When he began to behave erratically. Blentzas was restrained and pepper sprayed. His death was ruled to be the result of "excited delirium," a condition that is not recognized by the WHO. |
| 2002-12-07 | Stevenson, Thomas (46) | British Columbia (Vancouver) | | After police officers pointed weapons at him in a stolen car, Thomas Stevenson locked the doors. He was shot six times by two Vancouver Police Department officers after they believed he was drawing a gun, which turned out to be a plastic toy. An internal investigation found no misconduct but it later emerged in the Coroner's Inquiry that " the internal investigators had never interviewed Sgt. Clive Milligan or Const. Darren Foster, the two officers who fired at Mr. Stevenson, or any of the police officers who attended the scene." |
| 2003-02-28 | Moon, Lorraine (40) | British Columbia (Alert Bay) | | Moon, an Indigenous woman, was shot and killed by an RCMP officer at her home in a small Whe-la-la-U community. She allegedly refused to put the knife she was holding down. Her nine-year-old daughter was home at the time of the incident. |
| 2003-07-14 | Tabesh, Keyvan (18) | British Columbia (Port Moody) | | Keyvan Tabesh, an Iranian teen, had been driving around the city behaving erratically and wielding a machete in a threatening manner. After a police vehicle blocked his car in a cul-de-sac, Tabesh and one other occupant exited the vehicle and ran towards the responding officer. Tabesh was holding what the officer perceived to be a wood-handled weapon of an unknown type and was shot and killed. |
| 2004-01-10 | Bellon, Antonio (63) | Ontario (Toronto) | | Bellon shot and wounded an officer with a shotgun. |
| 2004-05-24 | Reodica, Jeffrey (17) | Ontario (Toronto) | | The 17-year-old was among a group of teens that was chasing another group on May 21, 2004, before being shot by a plainclothes police officer who arrived in an unmarked car. |
| 2004 | | Ontario (Toronto) | | Person shot by police. SIU investigations deemed action justified. |
| 2004-06-13 | O'brien, Christopher-Reid | Ontario (Toronto) | | Reid shot by police. SIU investigations deemed action justified. |
| 2004-08-25 | Brookes, Sugstan Anthony (45) | Ontario (Toronto) | | After firing at his wife and missing, Brookes grabbed 20-year-old Regis and held her hostage at Union Station. After negotiations stalled, he was shot by a police sniper. |
| 2004-12-26 | Chenery, Gerald (29) | British Columbia (Vancouver) | Vancouver Police Service | Vancouver police officers fatally shot Mr. Chenery in response to him pulling a knife and lunging towards them. |
| 2004-12-31 | (17) | Ontario (Toronto) | | 17-year-old shot by police. SIU investigations deemed action justified. |
| 2004 | St. Arnaud, Kevin | British Columbia (Vanderhoof) | | Shot three times after a pursuit. An officer claimed that he fell down and shot at St. Arnaud three times as he was advancing on him. However, other witnesses, including the officer's partner, stated that he stood up and fired. St. Arnaud was not armed at the time of the incident. Officer was not charged as he was cleared in an investigation by internal affairs. |
| 2005-01-31 | Dumas, Matthew (18) | Manitoba (Winnipeg) | | Matthew Dumas was shot by a policeman while carrying a screwdriver, in which the police interpreted as being a lethal weapon. |
| 2005-05-27 | Lauzon, Ucal | Ontario (Toronto) | | Murder suspect Ucal Lauzon was shot by police after brandishing a knife towards them. |
| 2005-10-18 | Black, Jeffrey (21) | Ontario (Markham) | York Regional Police | Black was shot and killed by York Regional Police, who were responding to a call regarding a break-in. He attempted to stab police officers with a knife and police pepper sprayed him before shooting him twice in the abdomen. During the incident Black dared the officer to shoot him. The officer was cleared of any wrongdoing by the SIU. Black had previously been incarcerated as a juvenile. |
| 2005-10-29 | Bush, Ian | British Columbia (Houston) | RCMP | Ian Bush was shot by a police officer after punching and attempting to choke him. |
| 2005-11-05 | Steacy, Jason (20) | Ontario (Elgin) | Ontario Provincial Police | Jason Steacy was a man with a history of mental illness known to the police. Ontario Provincial Police responded to a call about an intoxicated man, then learned he has stabbed someone in the neck with a knife. Police entered Steacy's trailer with guns drawn and shot and killed him as he turned towards them because they believed him to be holding a gun. The object in question turned out to be a computer mouse. The officer was cleared of any wrongdoing by the SIU. |
| 2005-12-01 | Bennis, Mohamed Anas | Quebec (Montreal) | SPVM | Shot twice by an SPVM officer after Bennis allegedly attacked them with a knife for no apparent reason. |
| 2006-01-11 | Unknown (40) | Ontario (Markham) | York Regional Police | An unnamed man was shot and killed by York Regional Police while reportedly trying to kill his father. He was known to have a history of mental illness. The SIU ruled the shooting justified. |
| 2006-06-14 | Beauchamp, Yves (53) | Quebec (St. Sulpice) | Sûreté du Québec | Beauchamp was killed in his home when Sûreté du Québec burst in before dawn because "they were worried he might destroy evidence related to a fraud investigation". He had a firearm and his wife stated she believed he may of thought a home invasion was taking place "since one had occurred in a neighboring home. He was shot in the head by police. |
| 2006-06-20 | Christian, Duane (15) | Ontario (Toronto) | | Christian was killed after two Toronto police constables who had pursued and stopped his van fired several shots to prevent him getting away. |
| 2006-08-11 | Gregory, Robert (70) | Nova Scotia (Forest Glen) | RCMP | Gregory, who was armed, was shot by an RCMP officer. The shooting was found justified by authorities. |
| 2007-03-27 | Saleh-Azad, Ahmad (61) | Manitoba (Winnipeg) | | |
| 2007-08-13 | Boyd, Paul (39) | British Columbia (Vancouver) | | Boyd, an animator who worked for Cartoon Network, allegedly swung a bicycle chain after he hit an officer. He was shot a total of nine times |
| 2007-10-14 | Dziekański, Robert | British Columbia (Richmond) | | Robert Dziekański, killed by the RCMP at the Vancouver International Airport in October 2007. |
| 2007-10-14 | Registre, Quilem | Quebec (Montreal) | | Registre collided with a parked car after running a stop sign, police electrocuted him six times with their tasers in the process of arresting him. |
| 2007-11-20 | Graham, Trevor Colin (26) | Ontario (Kitchener) | | 26-year-old Trevor Colin Graham was shot and killed in a Shoppers Drug Mart after robbing it for prescription drugs. He was armed with a double-edged utility tool. |
| 2008-01-21 | Cloutier, Gilles (43) | Quebec | | Shot and killed by police while carrying a fishing knife following a car chase. |
| 2008-02-16 | Debassige, Byron (28) | Ontario (Toronto) | | Debassige, who suffered from schizophrenia, advanced on officers holding a knife. |
| 2008-03-18 | Montgrand, Jacqueline (44) | Saskatchewan (Prince Albert) | | Montgrand, a First Nations woman, was shot after approaching officers with a knife. |
| 2008-06-28 | Leclair, David (35) | Quebec (Gatineau) | | David Leclair was shot 3 times and including once directly in the back by Gatineau Police Officer Pierre Francois Blais. |
| 2008-08-09 | Villanueva, Fredy Alberto | Quebec (Montreal) | | During an intervention to identify his brother Danny, Fredy Villanueva along with a group of friends attacked two police officers before the officer fired a few rounds, one of which killed Fredy. |
| 2008-11-29 | Boryskavich, Nathan (43) | Manitoba (The Pas) | RCMP | Boryskavich died of hemorrhaging and a torn artery after being pepper sprayed and kicked by RCMP officers who were responding to a call from his ex. Officers were not found responsible but were criticized for not following protocol, including not accessing Boryskavich's record of mental illness before arrival and failing to remove his young daughter from the scene. |
| 2008-12-21 | Moynaugh, Gregory (25) | Ontario (Port Credit) | Peel Regional Police | Moynaugh, who was bipolar and had a history of mental illness was shot by Peel police outside his father's apartment. He was armed with serrated knives. Friends later reported that he had been struggling with a change in his medication. The officer was cleared of any wrongdoing by the SIU. |
| 2009-03-06 | Jeffrey, Paul (27) | Ontario (Ottawa) | Ottawa Police Service | 27-year-old Paul Jeffrey was shot by Ottawa police shortly after robbing a nearby TD Bank. Officers chased after Jeffrey on foot, who then threatened to shoot the officers and pointed what later turned out to be a fake firearm at the officers. The officers shot Jeffrey in defense, who then died shortly after from the gunshot wounds. |
| 2009-04-22 | Bastien, Richard (43) | Ontario (Ottawa) | Ottawa Police Service | After the suspect pointed his gun at police, police shot him multiple times. He also shot himself in the head and died two days later. |
| 2009-06-22 | Minty, Douglas (59) | Ontario (Elmvale) | | Douglas Minty, who suffered from mental illness, had a dispute with a door-to-door salesperson who proceeded to call the police. Upon police arrival Douglas left his home and walked towards the officer. The officer believed Douglas had something in his hand and yelled for him to drop it. Douglas did not respond and continued to walk towards the officer at which point the officer shot Douglas multiple times in his yard, where he died. |
| 2009-10-23 | Hughes, Jeffrey (48) | British Columbia (Nanaimo) | RCMP | Hughes was shot three times by Royal Canadian Mounted Police officers at his apartment complex, after police were called for a noise complaint over loud music. Police were told before arriving that Hughes was mentally ill. Hughes threatened to kill police and came out with a gun. The gun was later determined to be a flare gun. |
| 2009-11-08 | Therrien, Éric (35) | Quebec (Papineauville) | Sûreté du Québec | Eric Therrien's partner called 911 because Therrien was in a state of distress, drinking and talking about suicide. Therrien panicked when an officer shone a flashlight at him and pulled out a knife. A Sûreté du Québec officer shot him six times, killing him. No charges were laid in Therrien's death. |

=== 2010s ===
| Date | Name (age) of deceased | Province or Territory City | Police Force | Description of Incident |
|---|---|---|---|---|
| 2010-01-18 | Auger, Bernadette (48) | Alberta (Edmonton) | Edmonton Police Service | Auger was shot by two officers while brandishing a replica handgun in front of them. The gun was a near exact replica of a SIG Sauer P230 and lacked an orange tip or any other feature that would indicate it was a replica. Auger had expressed suicidal thoughts in the past. |
| 2010-02-23 | Lyon, Kenneth | Ontario (Hamilton) | Hamilton Police Service | Kenneth Lyon by Hamilton Police Service, 2010 |
| 2010-03-06 | Daniels, Eric | Manitoba (Winnipeg) | Winnipeg Police Service | Eric Daniels by Winnipeg Police Service, 2010 |
| 2010-05-09 | Muir, Lance Trevor | Manitoba (Winnipeg) | Winnipeg Police Service | Lance Trevor Muir by Winnipeg Police Service, 2010 |
| 2010-07-18 | Lewis, Corey Jason (39) | Alberta (Okotos, Alberta) | RCMP | Lewis, a man with a history of mental illness barricaded himself in his residence following an altercation with his family. During the subsequent standoff, Lewis rushed outside was shot twice. He succumbed to his injuries while being transported to hospital. (2015), [2015] (Provincial Court of Alberta) |
| 2010-08-10 | Doan, Jason (28) | Alberta (Red Deer) | RCMP | Doan was smashing car windows with a baseball bat and yelling threats when police arrived. He resisted arrest, using a stick as a weapon. A third officer threatened to use a taser if Doan didn't comply, and Doan was tased three times in the back. When officers noticed he was turning blue, they attempted CPR. Doan died after three weeks in the hospital. |
| 2010-08-25 | Jones, Evan | Ontario (Brantford) | | Suicidal man wielding knives is shot by police outside his home. |
| 2010-08-29 | Jardine-Douglas, Reyal (25) | Ontario (Toronto) | | Jardine-Douglas, who suffered from mental illness, approached an officer holding a knife |
| 2010-09-29 | Osawe, Eric | Ontario (Toronto) | Toronto Police Service | Eric Osawe was shot once by Toronto Police Service Officer David Cavanagh during an early-morning police raid at his apartment in Etobicoke. The raid was conducted by the Emergency Task Force and Guns and Gangs Squad. Two months later, Cavanagh was charged with manslaughter in Osawe's death. In February 2012, the charge was upgraded to second-degree murder. In April 2014, Cavanagh was cleared of murder and manslaughter charges, and the shooting was considered accidental by the province's highest court. |
| 2011-01-10 | Jean Steven Boucher | Alberta (Canmore) | RCMP | Jean Steven Boucher was shot and killed by RCMP officers after brandishing a replica handgun during a traffic stop. |
| 2011-02-02 | Chinnery, Andreas | Ontario (Hamilton) | Hamilton Police Service | Andreas Chinnery by Hamilton Police Service, 2011 |
| 2011-02-05 | | Alberta (Edmonton) | Edmonton Police Service | |
| 2011-02-14 | Kiteley, James | Ontario (Hamilton) | Hamilton Police Service | James Kiteley by Hamilton Police Service, 2011 |
| 2011-03-2 | Purdie, Adam (28) | British Columbia (Surrey) | | Adam Purdie was stopped by police who saw a firearm in the back seat of his vehicle. After a pursuit Purdie hit another vehicle and his vehicle was rammed by a police car. An RCMP officer fired 30 shots at Purdie. 16 bullet wounds were found by the coroner, who also found that Purdie had shot himself in the neck, although this was a "survivable injury." Regarding a previous encounter with police in which he pointed a gun at an ex-partner, Purdie had stated he had hoped the police would kill him. |
| 2011-03-12 | Kim, Carl | Ontario (Burlington) | | |
| 2011-06-07 | Hamel, Mario (40); Limoges, Patrick (36) | Quebec (Montreal) | | Police officers fired at Mario Hamel after he allegedly attacked them with a knife, killing him. A bullet also ricocheted on the ground, hitting Patrick Limoges who was on his bicycle |
| 2011-06-10 | Peeace, Corwin (40) | Alberta (Calgary) | Calgary Police Service | Police responded to a check on welfare after Peeace's common-law wife called 911. Const. Steven Cook testified at a fatality inquiry that he kicked open the door and saw Peeace holding a knife, and fired four shots into his chest and arm after Peeace did not heed warnings to put the knife down. Cook testified he was unaware at the time of the killing that he had tasered Peeace twice in an incident 15 months prior. |
| 2011-06-11 | Gaudreau, Julien | Quebec, (Montreal) | | Gaudreau was in crisis, tearing apart his own apartment. He was pepper sprayed and restrained, and died on site. Cause of death was ruled to be "agitated delirium." |
| 2011-09 | Zinser, Justin | British Columbia (Nimpo Lake) | RCMP | |
| 2011-09-12 | | Alberta (Edmonton) | Edmonton Police Service | |
| 2011-10-20 | Spiewak, Peter Dominik (31) | Alberta (Calgary) | Calgary Police Service | Peter Spiewak was a schizophrenic man was killed by police at his family home. Two Calgary police officers shot him five times after he ran towards them with an axe. The police has been informed in advance that Spiewak was schizophrenic and possibly armed with a knife. His mental health had been deteriorating in the time leading up to his death and his mother had made attempts to get a doctor to help him. In 2014 the officers were cleared of any wrongdoing and the judge stated that no changes could be implemented to prevent a similar loss of life in future. |
| 2012-01-06 | Mohammadi, Farshad (34) | Quebec (Montreal) | | Mohammadi is fatally shot after allegedly approaching officers with a knife. |
| 2012-02-03 | Eligon, Michael | Ontario (Toronto) | | Eligon was shot after fleeing from Toronto East General Hospital while armed with two pairs of scissors. |
| 2012-02-13 | Chanthachak, Phonesay | Ontario (Hamilton) | Hamilton Police Service | Phonesay Chanthachak was shot by Hamilton Police Service. According to officers, Chanthachak allegedly tried to hit officers with his van. |
| 2012-02-16 | Nadreau, Jean-François (30) | Quebec (Montreal) | SPVM | |
| 2012-02-20 | Berry, Frank (48) | Ontario (Toronto) | | |
| 2012-03-20 | Taqqaugaq, Felix | Nunavut (Iglulik) | RCMP | Taqqaugaq, who was known by the RCMP to be schizophrenic, was shot three times during a wellness check during which he refused to be handcuffed. |
| 2012-04-27 | Soles, Louis (52) | Ontario (Chatsworth Township) | Ontario Provincial Police | Louis Soles was shot by the Ontario Provincial Police who came his home after a woman said he threatened her. After a standoff through the night in which Soles fired at police he was shot and killed. Friends and neighbors of Soles said he had been in a "downward spiral" following his release from jail. |
| 2012-05-02 | Roke, Matthew | Ontario (Ottawa) | | |
| 2012-09 | Matters, Greg | British Columbia (Prince George) | RCMP | |
| 2012-10-29 | Kayuryuk, Paul | Nunavut (Baker Lake) | RCMP | Kayuryuk, an Inuk man died from a stroke after police assumed he was intoxicated and arrested him on October 14, 2012. They did not provide him with medical care until the day after he was arrested. Kayuryuk died several weeks later in hospital. An inquest made several recommendations to prevent similar deaths, but the officers were not held responsible. |
| 2012-10-29 | Ray, Christopher Lewis (52) | British Columbia (Vancouver) | | |
| 2012-11-08 | Bayrami, Mehrdad (47) | British Columbia (New Westminster) | Delta Police Department | Mehrdad Bayrami was shot and killed by officer Jordan MacWilliams at the parking lot of Starlight Casino, after a 5-hour standoff. Bayrami allegedly fired several gunshots prior to police arriving and then held a woman at gunpoint, and then released her. He had a handgun and was pointing it towards his head while he was at bay with the now-disbanded Municipal Emergency Response Team, which composed of Port Moody, Abbotsford, New Westminster, and Delta police officers. At the end of the stand-off, multiple officers fired less-lethal weapons at Bayrami, and MacWilliams shot Bayrami with a rifle. Bayrami died 10 days later while in a hospital. In October 2014, Crown prosecutors charged MacWilliams with second-degree murder. MacWilliams was booked in jail and released on bail, and his court hearing was in December 2014. |
| 2013-06-07 | Mesic, Steve | Ontario (Hamilton) | Hamilton Police Service | Steve Mesic was shot and killed by officers, after he reportedly he charged at them with a shovel. |
| 2013-06-21 | Coffey, Christopher (41) | Ontario (Saugeen Shores) | | Died of "sudden death associated with excited delirium and prone restraint" after being restrained and handcuffed by police. An SIU investigation found no wrongdoing by the officers. Excited delirium is not recognized as a medical condition by the AMA, APA, or WHO. |
| 2013-07-13 | Levesque, Daniel | New Brunswick (Moncton) | | Levesque was shot four times while he was armed with a knife near the Moncton Coliseum. |
| 2013-07-27 | Yatim, Sammy (18) | Ontario (Toronto) | Toronto Police Service | Sammy Yatim was shot and killed by the Toronto Police Service on July 27, 2013. Yatim was in an empty streetcar and was brandishing a three-inch knife. Police officers told him to drop his weapon. Officer James Forcillo shot Yatim eight times, with six of the shots hitting Yatim as he allegedly fell to the floor. James Forcillo, was charged with second degree murder one month after Yatim's death, and was released on $500,000 bail. Forcillo was later acquitted of second degree murder and manslaughter, but found guilty of attempted murder and sentenced to six years in prison. He was paroled after serving two years. |
| 2013-08-02 | Cutarm, Lance | Alberta (Ma-Me-O Beach) | RCMP | Lance Cutarm of the Ermineskin Cree Nation was fatally shot by RCMP Cnl. Kevin Krebs during the attempted arrest of his father, Larry Cutarm. Lance, his brothers, and his uncles exited the vehicle and advanced on Krebs. Krebs shot Lance fatally and wounded Laron. None of the Cutarms had any weapons. |
| 2013-09-11 | Lord, Gerald(42) | Saskatchewan (Holdfast) | RCMP | Man fatally shot by Craik Royal Mounted Canadian Police officer. |
| 2013-10-24 | Unknown (39) | Alberta (Edmonton) | Edmonton Police Service | Man dies after being tasered by police. |
| 2013-11-13 | Pryce, Ian (30) | Ontario (Toronto) | | Pryce, a black man, was shot by police in a standoff where he was armed with a pellet gun. This occurred after fleeing from officers when they attempted to arrest him for an outstanding warrant. Pryce suffered from schizophrenia. |
| 2013-11-17 | Unknown (22) | Ontario (Halton) | | Man shot by police after pointing a pellet gun at them. |
| 2013-12-03 | MacIsaac, Michael (47) | Ontario (Ajax) | | MacIsaac had a metal table leg and did not comply after a police officer demanded he drop it. As MacIsaac approached the officer, the officer shot MacIsaac twice. MacIsaac died later at a hospital. |
| 2014-01-17 | Plante, Gaetan | British Columbia (Surrey) | | Shot by police at his residence. An inquest into his death was eventually called. |
| 2014-02-11 | Abogado, Natasha Carla (18) | Ontario (Toronto) | York Regional Police | As she stepped off a city bus, Filipina-Canadian teenager Abogado was struck and killed by Cont. Remo Romano of the York Regional Police who was driving an unmarked police vehicle going 115 km/h in a 60 km/h zone. Her family filed a 2.2 million dollar lawsuit against York police. Romano was eventually found guilty of one charge of dangerous driving and sentenced to eight months in jail. He then returned to work with the York Regional Police. |
| 2014-01-22 | Lacour, David (17) | Quebec (Montreal) | Sûreté du Québec | David Lacour, 17-year-old male shot by Sûreté du Québec on January 22, 2014. The officer responsible was eventually charged with manslaughter and discharging a weapon inappropriately. |
| 2014-02-03 | Magloire, Alain | Quebec (Montreal) | Service de police de la Ville de Montréal | Magloire was shot by police while he was wielding a hammer at them. |
| 2014-02-13 | Thorne-Belance, Nicholas (5) | Quebec (Longueuil) | Sûreté du Québec | While driving to a sting operation in an unmarked car with no emergency lights, Patrick Ouellet, a Sûreté du Québec police officer crashed in a car where Thorne-Belance was a passenger in the backseat. |
| 2014-02-28 | Roy, Jason Gary (34) | Alberta (Calgary) | Calgary Police Service | After responding to a call of shots fired, police officers followed a suspicious vehicle, when they then became involved in a vehicle pursuit. The vehicle began driving very erratically, including driving on sidewalks and the wrong way down a major road. After Roy, who was driving the vehicle, tried to ram his way out of being boxed in, more than 15 shots were fired. Roy was pronounced dead at the scene, Ashley Jennifer Silver, 26, who was a passenger in the vehicle, was sent to hospital in critical condition. Both Roy and Silver were reported as being "very well known to police." |
| 2014-02-28 | McCaffrey, William David (27) | New Brunswick (Rothesay) | Kennebacsis Regional Police Force | Kennebacsis Regional Police responded to a domestic dispute at a house owned by at least one of McCaffrey's parents. An officer shot McCaffrey who was said to be holding knives. Mayor Bishop relayed the incident by saying "he took one slash at the officers and missed and came back". |
| 2014-03-22 | Arkell, Christopher (50) | Alberta (Medicine Hat) | Medicine Hat Police Service | Man shot in armed standoff with police. |
| 2014-03-28 | Bassi, Charnjit | Ontario (Brampton) | | Bassi was fatally shot by police after he opened fire with a handgun at the Brampton Courthouse, wounding police officer Michael Klarenbeek. |
| 2014-04-14 | Ross, John Caleb (21) | Ontario (Aurora) | York Regional Police | 21-year-old shot to death by York Regional Police in Aurora, Ontario in April 2014. |
| 2014-05-9 | Quadros, John Carlos (55) | Alberta (St. Paul) | RCMP | Officers responded to gunshots being fired outside the RCMP detachment in St. Paul, Alberta. Quadros fled the scene in a pickup truck, which he then crashed into a police cruiser, injuring and trapping an officer inside. He then engaged in gunfire with responding officers, injuring two more. The officer shot and killed Quadros in the exchange of gunfire. Quadros is also believed to be responsible for the death of Rev. Gilbert Dasna, who was found suffering gunshot wounds which were inflicted before the police shootout, and later died from his injuries. |
| 2014-05-11 | | Alberta (Edmonton) | | Man killed by police in Edmonton, Alberta in May 2014 during an exchange of gunfire. |
| 2014-07-17 | Napartuk, Jobie (29) | Quebec (Inukjuak) | Kativik Regional Police Force | Inuk man shot and killed by police. Sûreté du Québec investigated his death. |
| 2014-09-03 | Blouin, Guy (48) | Quebec (Quebec City) | | Blouin was rolled over by patrol vehicle. |
| 2014-9-24 | Carby, Jermaine (33) | Ontario (Brampton) | | Carby was shot and killed during a police traffic stop at Queen Street and Kennedy Road. He allegedly had a knife or cutting instrument in his hand and was demanded by officers to drop it. |
| 2014-10-13 | de Groot, Peter | British Columbia (Slocan) | | De Groot was shot inside a cabin by Royal Mounted Canadian Police. |
| 2014-10-17 | Unknown (41) | Ontario (Oakville) | | Police shoot an unarmed suicidal man in a hotel. |
| 2014-10-20 | Couture-Rouleau, Martin "Ahmad" (25) | Quebec (St-Jean-sur-Richelieu) | | A man attacked two Canadian military personnel with his vehicle, killing one, and fled when the police arrived. He later crashed his car after a short pursuit, exited the vehicle, and ran toward the police officers with a knife before he was shot. During the police pursuit, Rouleau is said to have called 911 and to explain that he was doing this "in the name of Allah". See 2014 shootings at Parliament Hill, Ottawa. |
| 2014-10-22 | Zehaf-Bibeau, Michael | Ontario (Ottawa) | | Shot by parliamentary police inside the Canadian Parliament. |
| 2014-10-31 | Unknown (30) | Alberta (Calgary) | Calgary Police Service | Police were called about a man threatening others with a gun. When they arrived, the man pointed what was later found to be a replica Walther PPK pellet gun at one of the officers. Another officer, armed with a C8 rifle fired two shots, one hitting the man in his left torso. The man then fled inside a suite, at which point a tactical robot was sent in, discovering the man dead from his injuries. |
| 2014-11-01 | Mutch, Rhett (20) | British Columbia (Victoria) | | Rhett Mutch was shot in an encounter with Victoria police officers, after they arrived at his James Bay home in response to a 911 call. |
| 2014-11-22 | Du, Phuong Na "Tony" | British Columbia (Vancouver) | | Officers were called to an intersection in East Vancouver, where they saw Phuong Na (Tony) Du acting distraught and waving a 2x4 piece of lumber. Police fired a bean bag gun at Du, and then fired shots at Du, killing him. |
| 2014-12-27 | Woods, Naverone (23) | British Columbia (Surrey) | | Police were called to a Safeway store in response to reports of a man with a knife outside the store. The man was reportedly stabbing himself and advanced towards officers. A transit police officer fatally shot the man. |
| 2014-12-31 | Clause, Daniel (33) | Ontario (Toronto) | | Clause, a robbery suspect, was shot during an altercation with police. Clause allegedly used a handgun in the robbery of a fare collector at Warden subway station in Scarborough. |
| 2015-01-2 | Unknown (19) | Alberta (Grand Prairie) | | Police shoot a man while responding to an armed robbery of a convenience store. |
| 2015-01-12 | Vienneau, Michel (51) | New Brunswick (Bathurst) | RCMP | Vienneau was shot while in his car outside a train station. The City of Bathurst stated that Vienneau accelerated his vehicle at two RCMP officers, pinning one down. One officer fired shots at the car, fatally striking Vienneau. The officers initially believed that Vienneau was involved with drug related activity, although an RCMP investigation determined that he was not. In November 2015, the two RCMP officers were charged with manslaughter, assault, and firearms charges. All charges were dropped in February 2017. |
| 2015-01-29 | Edey, Waylon Jesse (39) | British Columbia (Castlegar) | RCMP | Shot during attempted traffic stop. |
| 2015-02-14 | Doucette, David (49) | Ontario (Mississauga) | | Shot by police in a boarding house after he stabbed another man. |
| 2015-03-16 | Heffernan, Anthony (27) | Alberta (Calgary) | Calgary Police Service | Calgary Police were called to a Super 8 Motel for a wellness check when Heffernan didn't respond to Motel staff after failing to check out on time. Officers were concerned about his welfare due to his history of drug abuse. There was also information that Heffernan may not have been alone in the room, and police were concerned for the welfare of others due to his violent history with police officers in the past. After numerous attempts to make contact with anyone in Heffernan's room to no avail, police officers had no choice but to force entry into it. Five officers forced entry into the room and encountered Heffernan, who began acting very aggressively towards the officers. Police attempted to use a conducted energy weapon (Taser) on Heffernan which failed to incapacitate him. Heffernan then lunged at police officers with a syringe, and police shot Heffernan as a defensive action against a crazed individual who had injected and swallowed large amounts of cocaine. The Alberta Crown Prosecution Service declined to lay charges based on the fact that there was absolutely no reasonable likelihood of conviction. |
| 2015-03-20 | Ekamba-Boekwa, Marc (22) | Ontario (Mississauga) | | Peel Regional Police called to a residence to investigate a death threat made by the neighbour Boketsu Boekwa. While attempting to arrest Boekwa her son confronted officers with a kitchen knife. 19 shots were fired by police, 11 fatally hitting the son Marc, one non-fatally hitting nearby resident Suzan Zreik through her kitchen window and another hitting a bullet proof vest wearing officer. Officers were cleared of any wrongdoing. |
| 2015-03-29 | Travis Rood (35) | British Columbia (Burnaby) | RCMP | Suspect in fatal stabbing shot by police. |
| 2015-04-02 | Baker, Beau (20) | Ontario (Kitchener) | | Shot by police outside his apartment building while in possession of a knife. Police were cleared in the shooting by the SIU as it was determined Baker refused commands to drop the knife and moved towards police. |
| 2015-04-04 | Walsh, David (66) | Nova Scotia (North Sydney) | | Struck and killed by a police vehicle. Cape Breton Regional Police say an officer was moving the marked vehicle to make room for the ambulance when it hit the 66-year-old-man. |
| 2015-04-04 | Cody Cole (23) | Ontario (Peterborough) | | Cole was shot by a Peterborough police officer after assaulting them with a knife. |
| 2015-4-5 | Dunphy, Don (58) | Newfoundland (Mitchells Brook) | | Shot in his home by a Royal Newfoundland Constabulary officer. Investigation still pending agreed facts an officer traveled to Mr. Dunphys home concerning apparent threats. Mr Dunphy appeared with a 22 caliber rifle and pointed it at the officer at which time he was shot three times. |
| 2015-04-09 | Unknown | British Columbia (Vancouver) | | Man shot by police after committing multiple stabbings. |
| 2015-05-17 | Duncan, Brandon (35) | Ontario (Guelph) | | Duncan was shot by two police officers in Guelph General Hospital's waiting room while having a mental health crisis. Duncan charged police with scissors after attempting to stab a bystander. |
| 2015-05-18 | Michael David Perreault (31) | Alberta (Edmonton) | | Perreault, armed with a shotgun, was killed by a police officer after he fired the shotgun at the officer, hitting him in the leg, at a traffic stop. The suspect was stopped for allegedly driving while drunk. |
| 2015-05-22 | Unknown (47) | Alberta (Morinville) | RCMP | A man armed with two rifles was trespassing on a person's property, resulting in officers responding. An altercation occurred between the gunman and police, and the gunman was shot. |
| 2015-05-31 | Gallant, Rene (45) | Quebec (Montreal) | | A man was fatally wounded by police after they came to an apartment in Montreal's gay village neighborhood to respond to a call of a domestic disturbance between a man and a woman. Reports suggest Gallant was attempting to strangle his girlfriend when police arrived. He then came at an officer with a knife, at which time he was shot. He was taken to hospital but died of his wounds. |
| 2015-06-11 | Hassan, Abdurahman Ibrahim (39) | Ontario (Peterborough) | | Black Somali refugee died in immigration detention. |
| 2015-07-05 | Loku, Andrew (45) | Ontario (Toronto) | | Loku made noise in his Gilbert Avenue apartment complex for ten minutes and was wielding a hammer. Loku stepped outside and encountered police for a few seconds before being shot. According to officers, they demanded Loku to drop the hammer and then shot him as he walked towards them with it. The apartment complex Loku lived at was subsidized by the Canadian Mental Health Association. |
| 2015-07-08 | Butters, James Reginald (24) | British Columbia (Port Hardy) | | Shortly after 11:00 a.m., officers were responding to a complaint of a male causing a disturbance. Witnesses heard officers repeatedly shouting "Drop the knife" before several shots were fired. A knife was recovered on the scene. Family members report that Butters suffered from mental health issues. |
| 2015-07-14 | McIntyre, James Daniel (48) | British Columbia (Dawson Creek) | RCMP | Outside the Stonebridge Hotel where a public hearing about a dam project was being held, McIntyre was brandishing a knife and approaching at least two RCMP officers with it. After allegedly refusing to follow demands to drop it, officers shot him. McIntyre was wearing a Guy Fawkes mask. |
| 2015-07-18 | Brooks, Hudson (20) | British Columbia (Surrey) | RCMP | Police say the call had come in about a suicidal man, screaming and in distress. An officer sustained a non-life-threatening gunshot wound from the incident and was released from hospital the next day. Police only found one weapon from the scene, a police-issued firearm. |
| 2015-07-25 | Skene-Peters, Kwasi (21) | Ontario (Toronto) | | Wanted in connection with a double homicide. Kwasi was fatally shot in a firefight with two officers after they followed him to his car where he had a handgun. |
| 2015-08-13 | Gray, Myles (33) | British Columbia (Vancouver) | | Myles Gray, a 33-year-old businessman from Sechelt, died in an altercation with several Vancouver police officers on August 13, 2015. He was unarmed when police arrived at an address in the city's southeast corner to investigate reports that a man was spraying a woman with a garden hose. A forensic autopsy showed that Gray suffered multiple broken bones, a dislocated jaw and a hemorrhagic injury to one testicle in the struggle. Despite the long list of serious injuries, the coroner was not able to determine an exact cause of death, and, last summer, forensic experts from other provinces were called in to help. |
| 2015-09-18 | Hanna, Kenneth Robert (48) | British Columbia (Burnaby) | | Police responded to a call of shots fired. The police shot Hanna multiple times, and he died at the scene. |
| 2015-11-06 | Dicesare, Mark (24) | Manitoba (Winnipeg) | | |
| 2015-11-16 | Maurice, Brandon (17) | Quebec (Messines) | | A 17-year-old teenager was shot by police after a pursuit. Maurice eventually stopped his car, and a Sûreté du Québec officer got out of his cruiser to approach the driver. At that point Maurice accelerated, dragging the officer alongside the car, Montreal police said. The Sûreté du Québec officer then shot Maurice. He was taken to the hospital but died of his injuries. |
| 2015-12-25 | Unknown (37) | Alberta (Sylvan Lake) | RCMP | A suspect in a slashing and wounding of a person was involved in a police chase, and was shot by Red Deer RCMP, after allegedly accelerating towards them. |
| 2015-12-27 | Unknown (17) | Quebec (Montreal) | | A 17-year-old teenager was shot by police responding to a family dispute, after allegedly refusing to put down a weapon. Both the teen and the 50 year old stabbing victim were taken to hospital, where the teen died, and the older person remained in a critical condition. |
| 2016-01-16 | Rattu, Gerald (59) | Ontario (Port Perry) | | A suicidal man approached police officers with a knife pointed towards his own chest. After refusing to drop the weapon he was shot by police. |
| 2016-03-19 | Tremblay, David (27) | Quebec (Sauguenay) | | Tremblay was pursued by police after they received notice of a possible break-in. He fled in his vehicle, which the police apprehended using caltrops; Tremblay continued to flee on foot and was shot to death. |
| 2016-04-04 | Benjamin, André (60's) | Quebec (Montreal) | SPVM | A man in his sixties is shot in his apartment by SPVM officers for allegedly coming at them with a knife. |
| 2016-04-25 | Bony, Jean-Pierre (46) | Quebec (Montreal) | | A 46-year-old black man was shot in the head with a plastic bullet, he died of his injuries four days after at the hospital. His death sparked a protest that was marred by violence in Montreal North. The officer involved has been charged with manslaughter. |
| 2016-06-13 | Ford, Craig (49) | British Columbia (Nanaimo) | RCMP | A man carrying a knife was shot on a street by Nanaimo RCMP. |
| 2016-07-25 | Abdi, Abdirahman (37) | Ontario (Ottawa) | | Man died in hospital after being beaten by police during arrest. |
| 2016-09-07 | Chrisjohn, Debra (39) | Ontario (London) | OPP | Chrisjohn, a member of the Oneida Nation of the Thames, died in OPP custody when they failed to provide her with medical care. She died of cardiac arrest due to a drug overdose and was reportedly unable to walk when London police, who had arrested her, handed her over to the OPP. Cont. Nicholas Doering was found guilty of criminal negligence causing death and failing to provide the necessaries of life, but continued to work as an officer awaiting sentencing. |
| 2016-09-10 | Driver, Aaron (24) | Ontario (Strathroy) | | Shot and killed by police after detonating a bomb in a taxi during an attempted arrest. Driver was known to police as a supporter of the Islamic State. |
| 2016-09-19 | Thiffault, Stéphane (55) | Quebec (Rawdon) | Sûreté du Québec | Thiffault died from two police gunshot wounds to the chest after allegedly charging at a Sûreté du Québec officer with an axe, on the scene responding to a 911 call about a man in distress. One officer attempted to persuade Thiffault to stand down, who refused and was subsequently shot dead. Following a DPCP inquest, the response was deemed justified and no charges were filed. |
| 2016-09-30 | Divers, Anthony "Tony" (36) | Ontario (Hamilton) | | Hamilton police were responding to an assault of a woman near the Dirty Dog Saloon. Police claimed that there were reports of the suspect being armed, but the origins of those reports are unconfirmed. A police officer confronted Divers and ordered him to stop. When he kept walking, the officer followed and repeated the same orders. Suddenly, Divers turned around and was shot. It is unknown if Divers had a gun on him at the time of the incident. |
| 2016-10-06 | Lafrance-Godmer, Danny (29) | Quebec (Montebello) | | Police responded to a call for a "man in distress" at a home on Saint François Xavier Street. Officers encountered Lafrance-Godmer in the attic, who ran at the officers with a knife. Lafrance-Godmer was then shot and later succumbed to his injuries and died. |
| 2016-10-06 | Megeney, Joshua (28) | Saskatchewan (Saskatoon) | | Megeney had broken into a home after the homeowner left for an appointment. When the homeowner returned, he discovered a broken window and called Police. The homeowner advised that there was a gun safe in the bedroom containing long rifles. When Police arrived, they discovered Megeney in the bedroom with a gun, and Megeney pointed the gun at Police. Police fired shots and then retreated. Later when Police re-entered they discovered Megeney deceased. |
| 2016-11-4 | Nabico, Rui (31) | Ontario (Toronto) | | Officers shot Rui three times with a stun gun while he was lying face down, holding two knives. The pathologist consulted by the SIU ruled that Rui's preexisting cardiac arrhythmia would have been deadly "irrespective" of the force used. |
| 2016-12-25 | Unknown (37) | Alberta (Red Deer) | | The man was fatally shot by police after he stole a front-end loader and went on a rampage on Christmas. |
| 2016-10-02 | Murphy, Chad (58) | Quebec (Montreal) | | A man in mental distress is shot in his apartment after allegedly charging officers with a knife. |
| 2017-01-06 | Cloutier, Jimmy (38) | Quebec (Montreal) | | Homeless with a long history of mental illness, suspected of a stabbing a man, was shot by police after making threatening gestures with a knife according to police. |
| 2017-01-07 | Stephens, Ralph (27) | Alberta (Stoney Nakoda First Nation) | RCMP | Stephens, a member of the Stoney Nakoda First Nation was killed by RCMP officers in a shootout. |
| 2017-03-06 | Celik, Koray (28) | Quebec (Montreal) | | Youth hockey medalist with ties to the Turkish community beaten by police in front of parents |
| 2017-03-18 | Qamaniq, Kunuk (20) | Nunavut (Pond Inlet) | RCMP | Qamaniq, a young Inuk man, was in a graveyard on the anniversary of his sister's suicide. His family say he was armed because he was going rabbit hunting but were concerned could be suicidal and phoned 911. RCMP officers shot and killed Qamaniq when he allegedly pointed the rifle at them. Initially RCMP lawyers claimed his death was a suicide, but a coroners report ruled it a homicide. A review by the Ottawa Police Service found the officers actions to be justified. In 2019 his family filed a lawsuit against the RCMP claiming that his death was due in part to a lack of de-escalation training and Inuktitut-speaking officers. |
| 2017-05-01 | Nuvviaq, Jeremy (39) | Nunavut (Hall Beach) | RCMP | Nuvviaq posted a broadcast about suicide by cop. After threatening to shoot officers, police fired on him. |
| 2017-05-15 | Therrien, Emmanuel (41) | Quebec (Beauceville) | Sûreté du Québec | Responding to a domestic dispute, police shot Therrien fatally after he pointed to a weapon on his belt. |
| 2017-05-22 | Kay, Kieran (26) | Ontario (Cambridge) | | |
| 2017-06-03 | Unknown (31) | Ontario (Ottawa) | Ottawa Police Service | An unnamed man was shot and killed by police after he shot two people in the ByWard Market, killing one and injuring the other. The SIU ruled that there were no grounds for charges against the officer. |
| 2017-06-10 | Anautak, Illutak (19) | Quebec (Akulivik) | Kativik Police Service | Illutak was shot by police after stabbing 3 people fatally. |
| 2017-06-15 | Cohen, Noam (27) | Quebec (Montreal) | SPVM | Distressed immigrant shot during a police pursuit. Investigation findings were sealed. |
| 2017-06-18 | Unknown | British Columbia (Port Coquitlam) | RCMP | An unnamed man was shot and killed by police during a shootout at his home. Initial police accounts suggested the fatal wounds were self-inflicted, but this was dispelled by a later coroner's report. |
| 2017-06-19 | Eaglechief, Austin (22) | Saskatchewan (Saskatoon) | Saskatoon Police Service | Eaglechief, an Indigenous man died in a high speed car chase with police as he drove a stolen vehicle. He was also shot at by police during the chase, although a coroner's inquest found that this "did not cause or contribute" to his death. Eaglechief had struggled with mental health and addiction. |
| 2017-06-27 | Coriolan, Pierre (58) | Quebec (Montreal) | SPVM | Coriolan, a Black man who had a history of mental illness, was allegedly wielding two screwdrivers when police responded to a distress call. Coriolan was not cooperating with the officers when they ordered him to drop the screwdrivers. Police used a taser and 40mm plastic bullets on Coriolan. He charged at the officers, who killed him. He was declared dead at the hospital following the incident. |
| 2017-06-27 | Shaw, Ozama (15) | Ontario (Mississauga) | Peel Regional Police | Shaw a 15 year old a recent newcomer from Jamaica was shot by police, who were responding to a gas station robbery. Shaw died 30 days later at The Hospital for Sick Children, Toronto from the gunshot wounds. |
| 2017-07-09 | Lévesque, David (37) | Quebec (Pont-Rouge) | SQ | Lévesque was pepper sprayed and then shot and killed outside a police station. At the time of his death he had a machete taped to his hand - which police officers ordered him to drop - and was suicidal, calling on officers to shoot him. A BEI investigation found the use of force to be justified. |
| 2017-07-18 | Culver, Dale (35) | British Columbia (Prince George) | RCMP | Dale Culver, an Indigenous man from the Gitxsan and Wet'suwet'en Nations, was arrested and sprayed with pepper spray whereupon he developed problems breathing. He was pronounced dead at the hospital. In 2019 IIO recommended laying charges against four RCMP officers but in of June 2020, they were all still working as police. |
| 2017-08-10 | Bolduc, Guillaume (25) | Quebec (Saint-Georges) | SQ | A man began acting aggressively, kicking and hitting cars. A flashlight startled him, resulting in a foot chase. Bolduc wounded the officer with a knife and was then shot by the officer. |
| 2017-08-20 | Belley, Jonathan (23) | Quebec (La Sarre) | SQ | Belley was shot and killed by police after he allegedly brandished a knife at officers. The BEI did not find any wrongdoing and the DPCP did not lay charges. |
| 2017-09-06 | Unknown (26) | Alberta (Whitefish Lake First Nation) | RCMP | RCMP were called to the Whitefish Lake First Nation following two 911 calls, the first was made by the unknown man's family saying that he was outside with a baseball bat and was on the verge of hurting himself or others. The second 911 call was made by two young women who reported being attacked by a man with a baseball bat. After one officer arrived on scene, he can be heard on the vehicles front-facing camera asking the man what was going on before telling the man multiple times to "drop the knife". The officer then deployed a taser, but the man didn't drop the knife and then chased the officer around the vehicle. The officer can be heard telling the man to drop the knife one more time before firing two shots. The man continued to approach the officer, making "thrusting motion[s]" with the knife before collapsing and dying of his injuries. A knife with a 7 inch long blade was later recovered from the scene. |
| 2017-09-09 | Dumas, Matt (30) | Alberta (Edmonton) | Edmonton Police Service | Dumas was shot and killed by police when they attempted to arrest him by boxing in the car he was in with two 18-year-old women with police vehicles, yelling command and firing tear gas into the vehicle. When Dumas was "not compliant and attempted to escape the vehicle" police shot him. Dumas left behind young children. Not to be confused with Matthew Dumas, an 18-year-old man killed by Winnipeg Police in 2005. |
| 2017-09-13 | Lacquette, Adrian (23) | Manitoba (Winnipeg) | Winnipeg Police Service | Lacquette, an Indigenous man who was suspected of assault and a carjacking earlier that night was shot by police nine times after pointing a replica wooden antique gun at police officers. |
| 2017-09-23 | Caron, Evan (33) | Manitoba (Winnipeg) | Winnipeg Police Service | Caron, an Indigenous man, was shot and killed by police after he stabbed a police officer. The IIU determined no charges should be laid against the officer. |
| 2017-10-10 | Severight, Cody (23) | Manitoba (Winnipeg) | Winnipeg Police Service (off-duty) | Severight, a member of the Waywayseecappo First Nation, was killed in a hit-and-run by off-duty Winnipeg police officer Justin Holz. Holz was driving up to 76 km/h in a 50 km/h zone and waited 12 minutes before informing police that he had struck someone. He was later convicted of dangerous driving causing death, and was sentenced to 30 months in prison. |
| 2017-10-12 | Unknown (35) | British Columbia (Qualicum Beach) | RCMP | An unnamed man was in mental distress, and had stabbed himself inside his vehicle. Police chased him down the side of the highway and then pepper sprayed and shot him as they tried to restrain him. The officers were cleared of any wrongdoing by the IIO. |
| 2017-10-19 | Unknown (37) | Alberta (Bashaw) | RCMP | At 9:15 a.m. officers located a parked stolen vehicle in the rural area. As members approached the lone male occupant to investigate further, a confrontation occurred leading the RCMP to shoot the occupant. The male involved in this incident was air lifted to hospital in critical condition and has since been declared deceased. The officers were cleared of any wrongdoing by ASIRT. |
| 2017-10-19 | Poucette, Cavin (26) | Alberta (Gleichen) | RCMP | Two officers approached a parked car; the claimed to saw its driver Cavin Poucette seemingly not conscious, with a shotgun between his legs. One officer went back to their vehicle to retrieve a rifle to cover the other officer. While alone, the first officer attempted to break the window to Poucette's vehicle, waking him up. The officers then claim to have shouted instructions to show them his hands and identified themselves as RCMP. They then claim that Poucette reached for the weapon, so the closest officer shot and killed him. Poucette's "shotgun" was later found to be inoperable. |
| 2017-10-24 | Whitstone, Brydon (22) | Saskatchewan (North Battleford) | RCMP | North Battleford RCMP responded to a call about a man being chased and shot at, pursuing a white 4-door vehicle resembling the vehicle described, the vehicle rammed a cruiser, the RCMP claim the driver, 22 year old Brydon Whitestone from Onion Lake Cree Nation, reached for something and officers opened fire. The incident is still under investigation, RCMP have turned over the investigation to the Regina Police Service. The review is to be overseen by the provincial Justice Ministry. |
| 2017-10-27 | Ryan, Tom (70) | Ontario (Cobourg) | Cobourg Police Service | Ryan, who was suicidal at the time, was shot and killed by police in a hospital emergency room. He was armed and exchanged gunfire with police officers. The two officers' actions were found to be justified by the SIU. |
| 2017-11-15 | Saunders, Bill (18) | Manitoba (Lake Manitoba First Nation) | RCMP | Saunders was shot and killed by police during an attempted arrest. |
| 2017-12-06 | Unknown (52) | Ontario (Douglas) | OPP | An unnamed man shot himself while being tasered by the police. An SIU investigation found the officers were not responsible for the man's death. |
| 2017-12-13 | Unknown (25) | Ontario (Maple) | York Regional Police | An unnamed man was shot and killed by police after he held up a bank. An SIU investigation found no wrongdoing by the officers. |
| 2017-12-23 | Saidi, Babak (43) | Ontario (Morrisburg) | OPP | Shot by police on his way into a police station as part of a court-ordered check-in procedure. No charges were laid against the officers involved. |
| 2017-12-28 | Sappa, David (22) | Quebec (Umiujaq) | Kativik Regional Police | Sappa, an Inuk man, was shot and killed by police in front of his father. He was carrying a knife at the time. His family later criticized the police's handling of the situation in the press. The officers were cleared of any wrongdoing by the BEI. |
| 2017-12-28 | Beaudoin, Dennis (36) | Quebec (Danford Lake) | Sûreté du Québec | A man phoned police to say Beaudoin, his son was mentally unwell and had left the house with a bow and arrow and iron bar. Beaudoin later phoned police and threatened to kill his father. Officers shot and killed him after he reportedly fired an arrow at them. The BEI cleared the police of any wrongdoing. |
| 2017-12-30 | Unknown | Ontario (Mississauga) | Peel Regional Police | An unnamed man was shot and killed by police. |
| 2018-02-03 | Joey Knapaysweet (21) | Ontario (Timmins) | | A young Cree man from Fort Albany was shot and killed by police while he was in Timmins seeking medical care. |
| 2018-03-22 | Mahoney, Matt (33) | Ontario (Windsor) | Windsor Police Service | At around 8 a.m., Mahoney was shot and killed by police during a confrontation in an alley behind a Shoppers Drug Mart downtown. Witnesses state that they had seen Mahoney carrying knives, and refused to put them down after police had ordered him to. When he refused an officer tasered him. While tasered he managed to push an officer to the ground before being shot. He died at 9:29 a.m. The Ontario Special Investigations Unit (SIU) is still investigating. |
| 2018-04-03 | MacDougall, Quinn (19) | Ontario (Hamilton) | Hamilton Police Service | Police shot and killed an allegedly armed teen who had called the police. The young man said to have been in "severe mental crisis". |
| 2018-05-17 | Pelletier, Josephine (33) | Alberta (Calgary) | Calgary Police Service | A Woman from Muskowekwan First Nation was killed by police in May 2018. |
| 2018-08-18 | Cardinal, Sterling Ross (29) | Alberta (Edmonton) | Edmonton Police Service | Cardinal, a father of three from Calling Lake First Nation was shot and killed by police after being involved in a hit-and run. Police said he refused to drop the shotgun in his possession and fired it at police. The ASIRT found that the officers actions were "justified and reasonable". |
| 2018-08-21 | Gibbs, Nicholas (23) | Quebec (Montreal) | SPVM | Gibbs was shot by police after attempting to take an officer's gun and then advancing on an officer with a knife in hand. |
| 2018-08-31 | Lail, Jaskamal Singh (25) | Alberta (Calgary) | Calgary Police Service | Young Indo-Canadian man was initially left alone by police during a schizophrenic health crisis they were later called to his residence for a noise complaint firing one plastic bullet followed by live rounds. |
| 2018-09-04 | Ningiuk, Tommy (40) | Quebec (Inukjuak) | Kativik Regional Police | Ningiuk, an Inuk man, was shot and killed by police in his home following a long standoff. The three other people in his house with him were released before he was killed. |
| 2018-09-14 | Marcano, Eugene Ethan (36) | British Columbia (Kamloops) | RCMP | Marcano was killed in a shootout with police in a rural area. The IIO investigation found no wrongdoing on the part of the officer. The officer who fired the fatal shot refused to speak to investigators. |
| 2018-09-22 | Unknown (32) | Ontario (Burlington) | OPP | An unnamed man, who was suspected of being involved in a hit-and-run, was shot and killed at a gas station. When the police arrived on the scene the man had barricaded himself in the washroom. After receiving a dispatch that there were "gang colours" inside the mans vehicle, the police in the gas station used pepper spray under the washroom door and attempted to pry it open. The man exited the washroom and exchanged gunfire with the officers before being shot dead. The SIU found no wrongdoing on the part of the officers. The officers involved in the shooting declined to be interviewed or provide notes for the investigation. |
| 2018-10-20 | Garlow, Robyn (30) | Ontario (Hamilton) | Hamilton Police Service | When police arrived Garlow was in a crisis and "not of sound mind", holding a knife. She did not drop it when ordered and instead began cutting her own neck. Police attempted to use a taser before she reportedly moved towards the officers and was shot and killed. The time elapsed between the officers entering the apartment and killing Garlow was less than 30 seconds. An SIU investigation found no grounds to charge the officer. |
| 2018-11-10 | Unknown | British Columbia (Shawnigan Lake) | RCMP | An unnamed man was shot and killed by police. He allegedly moved towards the police with an "edged weapon" and officers attempted to taser him before shooting. |
| 2018-11-29 | McKay, Jorden (27) | Newfoundland and Labrador (Corner Brook) | Royal Newfoundland Constabulary | McKay, a father of two, was shot and killed by police in his home. The Ontario Provincial Police investigated the incident. |
| 2018-12-25 | Perry, Stacey (30) | Alberta (Calgary) | Calgary Police Service | Shot by police in Calgary after lengthy police chase. |
| 2019-01-02 | Neyando, Devlin Kyle (26) | Alberta (Edmonton) | Edmonton Police Service | Police shot and killed Neyando, originally from the Northwest Territories, while attempting to arrest him on assault charges. |
| 2019-01-11 | Williams, Chad (26) | Manitoba (Winnipeg) | Winnipeg Police Service | Indigenous carpenter tasered and then shot by police. |
| 2019-01-31 | Ritchie, Greg (29) | Ontario (Ottawa) | Ottawa Police Service | Ritchie, an Ojibwe man of the Saugeen First Nation, was fatally shot by officers Thanh Tran and Daniel Vincelette while they responded to a call of a man wielding a knife at Elmvale Acres Mall. The "knife" was actually a replica arrowhead Ritchie had constructed, one of a series of "cultural artifacts born of his Indigenous heritage" that Ritchie made and sold. Ritchie had struggled with mental health since childhood and was on his way to the pharmacy to pick up medication at the time of the incident. Both Tran and Vincelette were cleared of wrongdoing by the SIU. |
| 2019-02-16 | Unknown | British Columbia (Bonnington) | RCMP | An unnamed man was shot and killed by officers near Nelson on February 13. The man died three days later in hospital. The officers actions were ruled justified by the IIO. |
| 2019-02-23 | Madut, Machuar (43) | Manitoba (Winnipeg) | Winnipeg Police Service | Member of the South Sudanese community shot by police while in a mental health crisis. |
| 2019-02-24 | Unknown | British Columbia (New Westminster) | RCMP | An unnamed man who was distraught, suicidal, and armed with a gun was shot and killed by officers at a shopping mall. |
| 2019-03-29 | McEwan, Nona (45) and Crosson, Randy | British Columbia (Surrey) | RCMP | Both were shot by members of the RCMP's Emergency Response Team in an attempted rescue during a hostage crisis. At around 9:30 pm on March 28, 2019, McEwan was taken hostage by her boyfriend, Crosson, in a home in the 13300 block of 98A Avenue in Surrey's Whalley neighbourhood. A 10-hour standoff ensued, which culminated at about 7:30 am the following day when law enforcement, believing the victim was about to be murdered, raided the bedroom where the victim was being held. As police fired, Crosson used McEwan as a human shield. Both individuals were fatally hit. Crosson died at the scene while McEwan, who police shot twice, died in hospital. No charges were laid against the officers as the investigation into the incident by the Independent Investigations Office of British Columbia determined that they had acted appropriately and Crosson is entirely at fault for McEwan's death. |
| 2019-03-30 | Jean-Louis D'amour (77) | Quebec (Sainte-Hélène-de-Bagot) | Sûreté du Québec | Jean-Louis D'amour died after being pepper sprayed by police. |
| 2019-04-02 | Richard, Benjamin (23) | Manitoba (Long Plain First Nation) | Manitoba First Nations Police Service | Police shot and killed Richard after his sister phoned police because her brother was "freaking out" and shooting at the house where their mother lived. Press reports do not indicate that anyone was home at the time. The family indicated that they did not believe Richard was attempting to harm anyone but was experiencing a crisis. The IIU cleared the officers who killed Richard of any wrongdoing. |
| 2019-05-01 | Unknown | Alberta (Calgary) | Calgary Police Service | An unnamed man died in hospital after being tasered by police, who were arresting him as a suspect in a hit-and-run. |
| 2019-05-04 | Morris, Geoff (41) | Saskatchewan (Regina) | Regina Police Service | An Indigenous father whose family said he struggled with PTSD and depression, Morris was shot and killed by police during an alleged hostage taking situation |
| 2019-06-14 | Unknown (48) | Ontario (Tecumseh) | OPP | An unnamed man in distress was shot and killed by an officer after he stabbed an officer with a small kitchen knife and scissors and managed to avoid being tasered. The SIU found no wrongdoing in the officer's actions. |
| 2019-06-25 | Unknown (21) | Ontario (Scarborough) | Toronto Police Service | An unnamed man was shot and killed by police while in a vehicle with three other passengers. |
| 2019-06-26 | Thompson, Sean (30) | Manitoba (Winnipeg) | Winnipeg Police Service | Displaced Little Saskatchewan First Nation man died in police custody. |
| 2019-06-26 | Fiddler, Robin (34) | Alberta (Calgary) | Calgary Police Service | Fiddler was a construction worker, mother of three, and member of the Waterhen Lake First Nation who was shot and killed by police. |
| 2019-06-28 | Unknown (54) | Quebec (Laval) | Laval Police Service | An unnamed man died during an arrest. |
| 2019-07-01 | Unknown (43) | Alberta (Edmonton) | Edmonton police | An unnamed Indigenous man died in hospital after a violent arrest by Edmonton police on June 28, 2019, sent him into medical distress. Footage of the arrest was recorded by a witness. |
| 2019-07-05 | Alaku, Sandy (48) | Nunavut (Salluit) | Kativik Regional Police Force | Alaku, an Inuk man, was killed when an improperly parked Kativik Regional Police Force vehicle rolled over him. He had just been the victim of an assault to which the police were responding. |
| 2019-07-14 | Cochrane, Randy (30) | Manitoba (Winnipeg) | Winnipeg Police Service | Resident of the Fisher River Cree Nation died in police custody. |
| 2019-07-23 | Shea, Billy (27) | Ontario (near Millbrook) | OPP | Shea was shot by a Peterborough police officer, with the OPP present, following a car chase and standoff. The officer was cleared by the SIU. |
| 2019-08-04 | Unknown (24) | New Brunswick (Moncton) | RCMP | An unnamed 24-year-old man was shot and killed by an RCMP officer in his apartment when he moved toward him with a knife. |
| 2019-08-10 | Unknown | Nova Scotia (Truro) | RCMP | An unnamed man was shot and killed by the RCMP while driving a stolen car. |
| 2019-08-11 | Din, Kyaw Naing (54) | British Columbia (Maple Ridge | RCMP | The Burmese-Canadian man, who was schizophrenic, was tasered and then shot and killed by the RCMP. His sister had called the police for assistance in bringing him to a hospital for treatment, as the police has transported him in the past without incident. The police have claimed that Din had a knife, which has been contested by his family. Din spoke only a few words of English, but police did not allow his family to translate for him. |
| 2019-08-27 | Silverquill, Lucien (37) | Saskatchewan (Fishing Lake First Nation) | RCMP | The Saulteaux man was shot and killed by RCMP officers. They had been called to his home because he had a knife and was "causing a disturbance." |
| 2019-09-10 | Unknown (34) | Ontario (Mississauga) | Peel police | An unnamed man died after being tasered by Peel police. |
| 2019-09-12 | Freeman, Evan (22) | Ontario (Kingston) | Kingston police | Freeman had stabbed several people with a knife. Kingston police shot Freeman, who then began hurting himself with the knife. Police then tasered him before he died. |
| 2019-09-24 | Unknown (42) | Alberta (Sherwood Park) | RCMP | An unnamed woman who phoned the RCMP for assistance was fatally shot at her home after she charged police with a katana. |
| 2019-09-30 | Unknown (27) | Manitoba (Winnipeg) | Winnipeg police | An unnamed man died a week after he became unresponsive during an arrest by the Winnipeg police and was admitted to hospital in critical condition. Police had responded to a call saying the man was "yelling and seemed confused". |
| 2019-10-23 | Unknown | British Columbia (Langley) | RCMP | An unknown man died after a "physical alternation" with the RCMP when taking him into custody. |
| 2019-10-28 | Donnelly, Clayton (38) | British Columbia (Malakwa) | RCMP | Donnelly, who struggled with mental illness, died after being tasered by RCMP officers. |
| 2019-11-12 | Unknown (48) | Ontario (Stone Mills) | OPP | The man, whose vehicle was in a ditch had previously told another resident to go away when approached and said he had guns. When the OPP arrived the man said he was "homeless and wanted to sleep where he was but eventually agreed to have his car towed and go to a shelter". Before leaving the man took a bat from his car, saying it was for his protection. When he did not put the bat down as officers ordered they shot and killed him. The SIU found that that lethal force was justified because the officers had "no other options". |
| 2019-11-20 | Mensah, Clive (30) | Ontario (Mississauga) | Peel Regional Police | Mensah, a black man, died after being tasered six times in his own backyard by Peel Regional Police. Two of the three officers involved have refused to speak to the SIU. Police had been called for a "suspicious male causing a disturbance", although it is unclear if Mensah is the male in question. |
| 2019-12-03 | Vanderwal, Wade (44) | Ontario (Exeter) | OPP | Vanderwal was shot by OPP officers in front of his mother, who had phoned police because he seemed to be experiencing a crisis and was behaving erratically. He had struggled with mental-health issues all his life. Police broke down the door Vanderwal had barricaded and shot him 13 times and killed him when he came towards them with a hatchet. |
| 2019-12-06 | Robb, Stewart (28) | Alberta (Cochrane) | RCMP | Shot and killed by police after a long standoff at his home. |
| 2019-12-31 | Penner, Fred "Troy" (56) | Ontario (St. Catherines) | | Penner, who struggled with mental illness for which he had sought care twice in the week before his death, was shot and killed by Niagara police after he allegedly brandished a knife. |

=== 2020s ===
| Date | Name (age) of deceased | Province or Territory City | Police Force | Description of Incident |
|---|---|---|---|---|
| 2020-01-07 | Francique, Jamal (28) | Ontario (Mississauga) | Peel Regional Police | Plain-clothes officer fatally shot Francique after he drove directly at an officer during an attempted arrest for parole violations. He died in hospital of his injuries two days later. |
| 2020-01-13 | Shantz, Barry | British Columbia (Lytton) | RCMP | Shantz, a longtime homeless advocate who struggled with mental health issues was shot and killed by police following a standoff at his home. |
| 2020-01-17 | Unknown | Quebec (Shawinigan) | SQ | An unknown man was in a state of distress, allegedly chasing a taxi and holding a knife when police arrived. He was shot and killed by police when he "turned on them in a threatening manner". |
| 2020-02-02 | Christian, Brandon (47) | Quebec (Saint-Georges) | SQ | Christian, a former professional hockey player, was shot and killed by police. He was pepper sprayed and tased before he was shot. Police, who had been called to the scene by Christian's ex-partner say he was armed with a bat. |
| 2020-02-02 | Unknown (27) | Alberta (Lloydminster) | RCMP | An unnamed man was shot and killed by police when trying to stop the stolen vehicle he and a woman were driving. |
| 2020-02-11 | Schriver, Brian Kyle (30) | Alberta (Blairmore) | RCMP | Police shot and killed Schriver after a traffic stop that escalated into a "confrontation". |
| 2020-02-26 | Ashoona, Attachie (38) | Nunavut (Kinngait) | RCMP | Ashoona, an Inuk artist was shot and killed by police after he reportedly charged at one of them with a knife. An investigation by Ottawa Police Service found that the officers actions were justified. |
| 2020-03-08 | Unknown | British Columbia (Whistler) | RCMP | An unnamed man died following an interaction with the RCMP. Preliminary reports say that: officers responded to reports of an intoxicated man causing a disturbance at a local business; during the man's interaction with police, the officers deployed OC spray, a conducted energy weapon and utilized their batons in an effort to gain control; whereupon the man suddenly became still; officers called EMS and began CPR; paramedics then transported the man to the hospital where he was pronounced dead. The incident is still under investigation by the Independent Investigations Office. |
| 2020-03-10 | Unknown (27) | Manitoba (Winnipeg) | Winnipeg Police Service | Fatally shot by police at his home following assault of two other adults with an "edged weapon". |
| 2020-03-12 | Legault, Sylvain (54) | Quebec (Montreal) | SPVM | Police shot and killed a man armed with a knife. |
| 2020-03-30 | Unknown (28) | Nova Scotia (Halifax) | Halifax Regional Police | A man experiencing a mental health crisis died after being tasered by police, allegedly to prevent him from hurting himself. |
| 2020-04-06 | Campbell, D'Andre (26) | Ontario (Toronto) | Peel Regional Police | D'Andre Campbell, a 26-year-old man who was suffering from a mental health crisis, was fatally shot by police in his home. Predicated on the independent analysis of: forensic evidence from the scene, physical evidence from the scene, communications recordings, and eyewitness accounts, the SIU delivered the following findings of fact: police received a 911 call wherein Campbell demanded police attend his residence regarding an argument he was having with his parents; officers attended the residence and were greeted inside by Campbell's mother; upon entry inside the residence officers found Campbell to be holding a knife and immediately issued repeated verbal commands instructing him to drop said knife; Campbell, knife in hand, then advanced towards the officers; two non-lethal deployment attempts of the officer's conducted energy weapons were then issued without avail; while still armed with the knife, Campbell advanced once more towards officers; in response, one officer fired twice at Campbell, striking him; officers dispatched for immediate EMS support and tended to Campbell, issuing first aid CPR; the attending paramedics continued with life-saving measures, but after they were unsuccessful in resuscitating Campbell, he was pronounced dead on scene. |
| 2020-04-08 | Eishia Hudson (16) | Manitoba (Winnipeg) | Winnipeg Police Service | Hudson, a teenager, was shot by police following a police chase in response to a liquor store robbing. She was pronounced dead in hospital. |
| 2020-04-09 | Collins, Jason (36) | Manitoba (Winnipeg) | Winnipeg Police Service | Collins, a father of three, was shot and killed by a police officer following a call regarding a domestic incident just hours after the death of Eishia Hudson. |
| 2020-04-18 | Andrews, Stewart Kevin (22) | Manitoba (Winnipeg) | Winnipeg Police Service | Andrews was a father of three young children who was shot and killed by police who were responding to a reported robbery. A 16-year-old boy was also injured by police during the incident. He was the third Indigenous person to be killed by Winnipeg police in 10 days, and the fourth police shooting victim in the city in 2020 |
| 2020-04-20 | Patrick, Everett (42) | British Columbia (Prince George) | RCMP | Patrick, died in custody the day of his arrest after being treated in hospital first for wounds inflicted by police dogs and then for a seizure. |
| 2020-04-19 | Wortman, Gabriel (51) | Nova Scotia (Enfield) | RCMP | Wortman committed multiple shootings and set fires at several locations in Nova Scotia, killing 22 people in deadliest rampage in Canadian history. Thirteen hours after police began pursuing him, at 11:26 a.m., Wortman pulled into the Irving Big Stop service area in Enfield, 92 kilometres (57 mi) south of Portapique and 40 kilometres (25 mi) north of Halifax. At least one RCMP officer who was already there to fill up on gas recognized Wortman, and shot and killed him. Wortman's death was confirmed by police at 11:40 a.m. |
| 2020-04-30 | Unknown (30) | Ontario (Toronto) | Toronto Police Service | A 30-year-old man was fatally shot to by police in a north Toronto hotel parking lot. The unnamed man reportedly called 911 on himself and then, following police arrival on scene, advanced on the officers while brandishing a knife. The independent SIU investigation revealed that an officer then yelled at the man to drop the knife; however, the man continued his advance, knife in hand, and as a result was fatally shot by the officer. |
| 2020-05-05 | Natanine, Abraham (31) | Nunavut (Clyde River) | RCMP | Natanine, was shot and killed by police. The incident was livestreamed by his partner. |
| 2020-05-06 | Blair, Philip (27) | Alberta | RCMP | Blair was shot and killed by police on Highway 2, south of Edmonton when he pointed a semi-automatic rifle at them following a long car chase. |
| 2020-05-23 | Unknown | British Columbia (Chilliwack) | RCMP | Police responded to a call about an "emotionally distressed man with firearms". A long standoff that resulted in the man's death ensued. |
| 2020-05-30 | Unknown | British Columbia (Delta) | Delta Police Department | An unnamed man died after he sustained serious injuries during the course of his arrest. The Independent Investigations Office of British Columbia completed an investigation into the incident, which found that: the unnamed man was pursued by Delta Police officers following reports that he stole a taxi; shortly thereafter, officers encountered the man driving the stolen taxi; an interaction between the parties then ensued wherein the man had brandished a knife and a metal pipe; officers deployed multiple methods of non-lethal force options including a conducted energy weapon and a 40mm less lethal launcher; however, the man slit his own throat during the interaction and was transported to a hospital where he was pronounced dead. |
| 2020-06-04 | Moore, Chantel (26) | New Brunswick (Edmundston) | Edmundston Police Force | Moore, a member of Tla-o-qui-aht First Nation, was shot and killed when police were called to do a wellness check. After reviewing the report by Quebec's Bureau of Independent Investigations and available evidence, New Brunswick's prosecution service determined that the officer's actions were "reasonable under the circumstances," finding that the officer was confined to a third-floor balcony and that Moore, armed with a knife, posed a "potential lethal threat approaching him quickly" and was ignoring his commands to drop the knife. |
| 2020-06-08 | Unknown (35) | Ontario (Woodbridge) | York Regional Police | An unnamed 35-year-old man died following an interaction with police officers. According to York Regional Police, officers were called to a Woodbridge address in response to a domestic dispute wherein a male was allegedly trying to ignite a fire within the residence. Following police arrival, an interaction occurred between officers and a 35-year-old male which resulted in his death and minor injuries to one officer. The SIU is currently investigating the fatal incident. |
| 2020-06-13 | Levi, Rodney (48) | New Brunswick (Red Bank) | RCMP | Rodney Levi, a 48-year-old Mi'kmaq man, was shot and killed by New Brunswick RCMP officers who were responding to a call about an "unwanted man" at a private residence. Levi was invited to a pastor's house for a barbeque and was initially welcome; however, at some point Levi was no longer welcome, leading to police being called. Investigators say that when police arrived, they were confronted by Levi who was carrying knives. Officers then attempted to use a stun gun several times but were unable to subdue Levi; an officer then fatally shot Levi. On January 26, 2021, the New Brunswick Office of the Attorney General released a statement following their receipt of the completed BEI investigation that independently analyzed Levi's death, which stated: “it is clear that on the tragic evening of June 12, 2020, the peace officers on scene did believe, on reasonable grounds, that force or a threat of force was being used against them by Mr. Levi and that one of the officers shot at Mr. Levi for the purpose of defending or protecting themselves and the civilians who were present at the residence whom feared for their safety. This action followed repeated attempts to engage with Mr. Levi peacefully, and followed several applications of a taser to disarm him from the dangerous weapons (knives) he refused to yield." Furthermore, witnesses helped shed light on the unfortunate events which transpired shortly before Levi's death: The four individuals at the residence stated that Levi, who they all believed to be "under the influence of something" picked up knives from the kitchen of the home and began waving them around. Levi refused to put down the knives, which resulted in 911 being called.; These witnesses said the responding officers were calm and tried to defuse the situation but Levi refused to drop the knives.; They further stated that Levi was then tasered three times by police and at one point said something to the effect of "you'll have to put a bullet in me", before "lunging" or "charging" at one of the officers, who then opened fire. |
| 2020-06-20 | Choudry, Ejaz Ahmed (62) | Ontario (Mississauga) | Peel Regional Police | After responding to an incident involving a man who was in possession of a knife and experiencing a mental health crisis, a Peel Regional Police officer shot and killed Ejaz Choudry, a 62-year-old man from Mississauga. Choudry's family states that he was alone and suffering from schizophrenia when they called a non-emergency helpline hoping that health-care professionals would tend to Choudry and assist him with his medication. However, when paramedics arrived on scene, they observed Choudry holding a pocket knife and notified the police. Upon police arriving on scene, Choudry's family states they offered their assistance with deescalating the situation—a request that was reportedly denied by the officers. Tactical officers, as well as the services K9 unit, responded to the incident and communicated with Choudry, who at this point was barricaded inside his residence alone. Officers were in constant communication with Choudry from their arrival at approximately 5 p.m. through until just before 8 p.m., at which point police say no further communication could be established for a period of nearly 15 minutes. Due to Choudry's extensive medical history, the state of crisis he was in, and the belief he had access to weapons, the police maintain they had reasonable grounds to believe the man posed a danger to himself. Consequently, police then entered the residence for the purposes of conducting a well-being check. Bystanders state that officers scaled the balcony of the apartment and kicked open the door to the apartment. According to the SIU, once police entered the unit, an interaction occurred which included officers deploying a conducted energy weapon at Choudry, as well as firing plastic projectiles from an Anti-Riot Weapon. When these had no effect, an officer fatally shot Choudry. Peel police and the SIU reported that a knife was recovered at the scene. The killing of Choudry led to protests, an independent investigation being launched by the SIU, and calls to fire the police officers responsible. The SIU said in a statement that they are continuing to investigate the incident but have not been able to speak with the subject officer, who "declined to be interviewed and did not submit a copy of his notes, as is his legal right." On April 6, 2021, the SIU determined that there would be no criminal charges against police for Choudry's death. Choudry was reported to be armed with a 20-centimetre-long kitchen knife when police arrived to his residence. The SIU director concluded "As such, I believe [the officer's] resort to his firearm was objectively reasonable, necessary and proportional to the threat posed by Mr. Choudry, notwithstanding the tragic loss of life it caused." |
| 2020-06-20 | Bellemare, Patrick (51) | Quebec (Montreal) | SPVM | Patrick Bellemare, a 51-year-old male died after an incident which involved him being pepper sprayed and subsequently handcuffed by Quebec police. According to the BEI investigation that followed: SPVM officers responded to a 911 call at a hotel where a foot-chase and a physical altercation quickly ensued between police and Bellemare. In response, one officer deployed pepper spray to subdue Bellemare, and shortly thereafter he was handcuffed as per arrest protocol. Officers immediately noticed Bellemare was having difficulty breathing and called for paramedic assistance. The man was then taken into paramedic care and transported to a hospital where he was later pronounced dead. |
| 2020-06-22 | Unknown (53) | Quebec (Lavaltrie) | SQ | An unnamed 53-year-old male was shot and killed by Quebec police following a domestic dispute at his residence. An independent BEI investigation found that: following the domestic incident, officers permitted the male to re-enter his residence for the purpose of obtaining personal property. One of the officers accompanied him inside for this task. While inside, the man quickly entered the kitchen, brandished a knife, and stabbed himself. The man ignored the officer's verbal direction to drop the knife, and advanced towards the officer, who then drew his firearm and fatally shot the man. Police immediately issued first-aid until paramedics arrived on scene. The man was then transported to the hospital, where he was pronounced dead. |
| 2020-07-08 | Peterson, Jason (42) | Ontario (Hamilton) | Hamilton Police Service | Jason Peterson, a 42-year-old male, was shot by the Hamilton Police Service on July 7, 2020, and died the following day while in hospital. Police were searching for Peterson following a domestic violence call, wherein it was reported that he had allegedly held a shotgun up to the head of a female. Officers later located Peterson, and approached him as he exited a variety store; this confrontation led to police shooting Peterson. A shotgun was recovered at the scene. Peterson was transported to hospital where he succumbed to his injuries the following day. |
| 2020-07-09 | Unknown (60) | Nova Scotia (Eastern Passage) | RCMP | An unnamed, 60-year-old male was shot and killed by the Halifax District RCMP. This fatal incident occurred when officers were investigating a complaint regarding an armed individual who was uttering threats. The RCMP issued a news release regarding this incident, which stated: “the man did not respond to officers’ directions. After a short time, the man raised his handgun towards the responding officers.” |
| 2020-07-15 | Hegedus, Lesile (73) | Ontario (Minden) | OPP | Leslie Hegedus, a 73-year-old male was shot and killed by police following an armed confrontation when officers were investigating reports of him allegedly assaulting a grocery store employee after refusing to wear a mask (in accordance with the COVID-19 pandemic.) The SIU is currently investigating and stated in a news release that their investigators recovered a firearm from the scene. |
| 2020-07-25 | Roy, Jonathan (33) | Quebec (Sherbrooke) | Le Service de police de Sherbrooke | 33-year-old Jonathan Roy died after being pepper sprayed by police during his arrest. The independent BEI investigation that followed concluded that Roy was pepper sprayed and arrested after repeatedly attempting to punch a police officer. Shortly thereafter, Roy told police and on-site paramedics that he was having difficulty breathing and had taken methamphetamines. Once in the ambulance, Roy went into cardiac arrest. He was taken to hospital where he was pronounced dead. |
| 2020-08-30 | Unknown | Alberta (Entwistle) | RCMP | An unnamed man, believed to be from Onion Lake, was shot and killed by police. According to independent ASIRT investigators, the RCMP were searching for a 32-year-old male following reports of him being armed with a firearm and having committed a domestic assault. Shortly thereafter, officers located the suspect's vehicle and made unsuccessful attempts to stop the driver. To de-escalate the situation, ERT members of the RCMP managed to contact the driver via phone; wherein investigators say: “the driver refused to surrender and made several threats regarding the use of his firearm”. Police eventually forced the vehicle to stop. At that point, a confrontation occurred which resulted in officers fatally shooting the male driver. A 22-calibre rifle was recovered from the scene. |
| 2020-09-09 | Unknown (29) | Ontario (Collingwood) | OPP | An armed man who barricaded himself in a residence was fatally shot by police. Investigators say that officers were outside of the males residence and were in the process of setting up an exterior perimeter, when the man suddenly approached police with a gun in his hand. An officer first deployed the use of a taser, which was unsuccessful. The male, still in possession of a firearm, continued to approach police, which resulted in the same officer fatally shooting the 29-year-old male. |
| 2020-09-18 | Powder, Marty (47) | Alberta (Edmonton) | Edmonton Police Service | Marty Powder was shot and killed by the Edmonton Police Service Edmonton police officers were responding to reports of the 47-year-old male carrying a firearm when a confrontation ensued between Powder and police, which resulted in him being fatally shot by officers. A loaded 12-gauge, semi-automatic shotgun was recovered at the scene, along with ammunition that was found in Powder's pockets. |
| 2020-09-20 | Unknown (51) | Alberta (Calling Lake) | RCMP | An unnamed 51-year-old man was shot and killed by police after dialing 911 and requesting they attend his residence. Athabasca RCMP received multiple 911 calls from a 51-year-old male requesting that police attend his residence so that he can "engage officers in a shoot out". The man's residence was attended to and subsequently contained by RCMP officers, who established a perimeter and awaited the arrival of their Emergency Response Team (ERT) that had been dispatched for deployment; however, the man exited his residence before their arrival and confronted the officers on the street while in the possession of a loaded 30.30 rifle. One officer shot the man during the encounter. EMS was contacted while efforts were made by police to provide first-aid to the male. The man died on scene. |
| 2020-09-29 | Unknown (35) | Ontario (Midland) | OPP | A pedestrian was struck and killed by an unmarked police vehicle. The SIU investigation that followed revealed the police vehicle struck the victim as he crossed against a red signal in the dark of night. |
| 2020-10-04 | Belhumeur, Jean (41) | Quebec (Saint-Agapit) | SQ | Jean Belhumeur, 41-year-old man was shot and killed by police after repeatedly discharging a long gun at Quebec police officers. The BEI completed an independent investigation into the circumstances surrounding this fatal incident. This investigation concluded that on October 4, 2020, after he shot at police hours earlier, SQ police and officers from the SPVM groupe tactique d'intervention (GTI) had established a perimeter outside Belhumeur's residence. Belhumeur opened the front door of his residence, stepped outside and raised his firearm in the direction of surrounding officers. GTI police officers responded with gunfire towards Belhumeur which struck him, causing him to drop and hit the ground. Officers then tended to Belhumeur and administered emergency first-aid until paramedics arrived on scene. Belhumeur was then taken to a nearby hospital where he was pronounced dead. |
| 2020-10-13 | Bédard, Michael (29) | Quebec (Mont-Laurier) | SQ | Michael Bédard, a 29-year-old male was killed after being struck by a police patrol car. While on route to aid an incident that required a cardiac defibrillator, a SQ police officer lost control of his vehicle and struck an oncoming vehicle. He then struck a second vehicle head-on which Bédard was operating, resulting in his death. |
| 2020-10-13 | Unknown | British Columbia (Gitlaxt'aamiks) | RCMP | An unnamed BC man died after being tasered by police. Officers of the Nass Valley RCMP responded to a report that a man had stabbed another man. On police arrival, the victim had already transported by paramedics, and officers located the suspect on the roof and in the possession of a weapon. While police were reportedly speaking to the man, he harmed himself. In an effort to take the man into custody, an officer deployed a taser and a struggle ensued, at which point several nearby civilians assisted officers while they took the man into custody. As BC Emergency Health Services was not readily available, the man was placed in the police vehicle for transport to a nearby health clinic. Lifesaving efforts were administered, and the man died at the clinic. |
| 2020-10-30 | Matthews, Sheffield (41) | Quebec (Montreal) | SPVM | Sheffield Matthews, a 41-year-old man and resident of Montreal, was shot and killed by Montreal police after officers responded to a 911 call about a man in distress. According to the BEI, the preliminary information suggests that Matthews, who was holding a knife, came towards the responding police car while officers remained in their vehicle. The man then allegedly changed course and approached a second vehicle which contained a civilian. Officers then exited their vehicle to intervene, at which point Matthews, while still holding a knife, allegedly charged the officers. In response, police fatally shot Matthews. |
| 2020-11-26 | William Shapiro (33) | Ontario (Kawartha Lakes) | OPP | A 33-year-old man and his son were shot after officers responded to a 911 call about a child abduction. Officers had identified the vehicle of interest and were in pursuit when it crashed into other vehicles including an OPP cruiser. Three officers then opened fire on the vehicle, striking both the driver and the one-year-old boy inside. The child was pronounced dead at the scene with his father dying from the gunshot wounds a week later in hospital. Forensic ballistic testing conducted by the FBI confirmed that both father and child were killed by police fire. In 2022 three constables who fired were charged with manslaughter and criminal negligence. |
| 2020-11-26 | Jameson Shapiro (1) | Ontario (Kawartha Lakes) | OPP | |
| 2021-01-05 | Martin Gordyn (27) | Ontario (Niagara on the Lake) | Niagara Regional Police Service | Martin Gordyn, 27, was driving a stolen vehicle when police began a chase. Upon the officers converging on the pickup, Gordyn reached into a duffel bag, taking out an unknown item, later identified as a butane torch, prompting a NRPS member to fire his weapon twice. Gordyn was pronounced dead later that day in a Niagara Region hospital. |
| 2021-02-27 | Jones, Julian (28) | British Columbia (Opitsaht) | RCMP | Julian Jones, a 28-year-old man of the Tla-o-qui-aht First Nations, was shot and killed by Tofino RCMP upon answering the door. The Independent Investigations Office of British Columbia, a civilian-led police oversight agency, has launched an investigation into the incident. Officers claimed they were responding to a call from a woman believed to be held against her will, while community members said they requested a wellness check. |
| 2021-07-08 | Lowndes, Jared (38) | British Columbia (Campbell River) | Campbell River RCMP | Vancouver Island RCMP say a man and a police service dog, Gator, have been killed following a violent confrontation near a Tim Hortons in Campbell River. |
| 2021-12-14 | McDonald, Dillon (28) | Saskatchewan (Montreal Lake Cree Nation) | RCMP | Dillon McDonald, a 28-year-old man of the Montreal Lake Cree Nation, was shot by Saskatchewan RCMP after they responded to a report that a man with a gun had chased someone out of a house. McDonald remained inside the house for five hours until police fired tear gas inside. About 20 seconds later McDonald came out swearing and holding a gun, and was shot by police. He died an hour later en route to hospital. Saskatoon Police Service launched an external investigation, with oversight from a Ministry of Justice-appointed independent observer. |
| 2022-02-19 | Latjor Tuel | Alberta (Calgary) | Calgary Police Service | Tuel, a black man, refused to drop his knife during a lengthy confrontation with police. Police fired less-lethal baton rounds, used a taser, and sent in a police dog in an effort to subdue him; Tuel repeatedly stabbed the dog. Tuel was shot dead when he continued to confront police while holding his knife. |
| 2022-02-24 | Unknown (36) | Alberta (Edmonton) | Edmonton Police Service | Police responding to a robbery in Downtown Edmonton fired at the suspect, who was holding a fake firearm. Police accidentally shot bystander James Hanna, who was watching television in his apartment nearby. |
| 2022-02-24 | James Hanna (59) | Alberta (Edmonton) | Edmonton Police Service | Police responding to a robbery in Downtown Edmonton fired at the suspect, who was holding a fake firearm. Police accidentally shot bystander James Hanna, who was watching television in his apartment nearby. |
| 2022-06-28 | Mathew Auchterlonie (22) | British Columbia (Saanich) | Saanich Police Department, Victoria Police Department, Greater Victoria Emergency Response Team | Twin brothers Mathew and Isaac Auchterlonie, suspected of a bank robbery, died after a shootout with police. |
| 2022-06-28 | Isaac Auchterlonie (22) | British Columbia (Saanich) | Saanich Police Department, Victoria Police Department, Greater Victoria Emergency Response Team | Twin brothers Mathew and Isaac Auchterlonie, suspected of a bank robbery, died after a shootout with police. |
| 2022-07-25 | Jordan Daniel Goggin (28) | British Columbia (Langley) | RCMP | A man suspected of shooting several people, killing two, was killed in a shootout with police. Police say the man was targeting the homeless. |
| 2022-08-22 | Chris Amyotte (42) | British Columbia (Vancouver) | Vancouver Police Department | Police were called after Amyotte, an Ojibway man, was maced. After he was maced Amyotte took his clothes off and doused himself with water and milk. Officers arrived and shot Amyotte with a bean bag gun, killing him. |
| 2022-09-12 | Sean Petrie (40) | Ontario (Hamilton) | Hamilton Police Service | A man suspected of killing a Toronto Police Constable in Mississauga and killing another man in Milton was shot and killed by police at a cemetery in Hamilton. |
| 2022-09-17 | Ronny Kay (38) | Quebec (Montreal) | SPVM | Police responded after a man was reported holding an object that appeared to be a gun. Officers shot and killed Kay when he allegedly pointed the object at police. |
| 2022-12-18 | Franceso Villi (73) | Ontario (Vaughan) | York Regional Police | A man suspected of killing five people at an apartment complex was killed by police. |
| 2023-04-01 | Boden Umpherville (40) | Saskatchewan (Prince Albert) | Prince Albert Police Service | Umpherville was one of three occupants in a vehicle reported stolen. While arresting Umpherville, police used stun guns and pepper spray, and a baton against the windshield; one officer hit Umpherville before pulling him out of the vehicle. Video showed officers yelling at the occupants to "get out and put their hands up", and warning occupants multiple times they would be tased. Umpherville fell unconscious, and died in hospital. A loaded handgun was recovered at the scene. |
| 2023-12-31 | Afolabi Opaso (19) | Manitoba (Winnipeg) | Winnipeg Police Service | Police shot and killed Opaso, a university student from Nigeria, as he allegedly held two knives during a mental health crisis. |
| 2024-04-20 | unidentified male (27) | Manitoba (Sandy Bay First Nation) | RCMP | A suspect armed with multiple weapons was shot and killed by police on a First Nations reserve. |
| 2024-06-04 | Tristan Mariash (30) | Manitoba (Otterburne) | Winnipeg Police Service | |
| 2024-06-30 | Mathios Arkangelo (28) | Alberta (Edmonton) | Edmonton Police Service | Mathios Arkangelo, a 28-year-old Sudanese-Canadian, was fatally shot by Edmonton police on June 29, 2024, after being involved in a car accident and walking away with his hands raised while holding a utility knife. The incident sparked widespread protests and demands for police accountability in Edmonton. |
| 2024-08-30 | Hoss Lightning (15) | Alberta (Wetaskiwin, Alta.) | RCMP | Two Mounties opened fire on a 15 year old boy from the Samson Cree Nation. The boy had called 911 asking for help and alleging people were trying to kill him. |
| 2024-09-03 | Tammy Bateman (30's) | Manitoba (Winnipeg) | Winnipeg Police Service | Bateman, a Roseau River Anishinaabe First Nation woman and mother of small children was struck by a police vehicle which was driving through a Winnipeg park. The Independent Investigation Unit of Manitoba is investigating. |
| 2024-09-06 | Jason West (57) | Ontario (Windsor) | Windsor Police Service | West, a Sixties Scoop survivor was fatally wounded after 2 police officers opened fire on him. Police were called to investigate a 911 report about a man with a knife. Special Investigations Unit (SIU) is investigating. |
| 2024-09-08 | Steven "Iggy" Dedam | New Brunswick (Elsipogtog First Nation) | RCMP | Dedam was tased then shot 3 times by an officer during a wellness check after. The incident is being investigated by the Serious Incident Response Team. |
| 2024-09-08 | unidentified male | Saskatchewan (Ahtahkakoop Cree Nation) | RCMP | Shellbrook RCMP shot and killed a man who was fleeing a confrontation with police. Saskatchewan's Serious Incident Response (SIRT) is investigating. |
| 2024-09-10 | Erixon "Gentil" Kabera | Ontario (Hamilton) | Hamilton Police Service | Kabera (1981–2024) was a black Canadian man. A former public servant at the Canada Revenue Agency, father of three, and community organiser, he died after an encounter with the Hamilton Police Service. Mr Kabera was shot multiple times by police in his apartment building in Hamilton. He died of his wounds. Erixon was born in Rwanda in 1981 and emigrated to Canada. He settled in Hamilton, Ontario. He was a member of The Rwandan-Canadian Healing Centre (RCHC) A CBC News article describes how his death has shocked the community. His death was also reported in the Rwandan media. After Erixon's death, marches were organised demanding justice and police accountability. Marches began in Hamilton after the shooting and developed in cities throughout Canada: in Hamilton, ON on 14 Nov; in Montreal, QC on 24 Nov; in Ottawa, ON on 14 Dec; in Regina, SK on 4 Jan; A march for Erixon was organised and attended by Matthew Green, NDP MP for Hamilton, in Hamilton on 14 November. The Special Investigations Unit (Ontario) (SIU), the civilian law enforcement agency having jurisdiction over police officers in Ontario, invoked its mandate to investigate this case. The SIU made an inaccurate statement on 9 November: "There was an exchange of gunfire, resulting in both the man and an officer suffering gunshot wounds". This statement was later replaced by another statement: "Based on information that has come to light in the course of the investigation, it does not appear that the man discharged a firearm. A police officer was taken to hospital as well but has been released from hospital after receiving treatment for minor injuries." As a result, Hamilton Police Chief Frank Bergen released another statement on 13 November, which contradicts the statement of 9 November by the SIU. The family of Erixon released a statement: "... we stand firm in our belief that Erixon was not armed, nor would he act in a way that would justify this result." On June 6, 2025, the Special Investigations Unit (SIU) report of the case was released. The report cleared the two Hamilton police officers (one male and one female) who shot and killed Erixon. The news of the release was reported in the media. The report stated that "[t]he complainant was holding what appeared to be a handgun in his right hand at waist level, pointed at the floor,". As well as "The object in the complainant's possession was not an actual firearm, although it did give the appearance of being a genuine semi-automatic pistol." |
| 2024-09-19 | Vanessa Renteria Valencia (37) | British Columbia (Surrey) | RCMP | Surrey RCMP were called to about a domestic disturbance and told that Renteria Valencia had barricaded herself and infant daughter in her bedroom and she may have a weapon. Renteria Valencia was a black Colombian refugee and there were reports the RCMP used her husband as an interpreter, even though she had recently fled to a shelter with her daughter stating he was abusive. |
| 2025-03-30 | Abisay Cruz (29) | Quebec (Montreal) | SPVM | Police responded to a call about an individual, Cruz, in crisis which escalated into a physical altercation, the police restrained and handcuffed Cruz on the floor, kneeling on his back. In a video of the incident Cruz can be heard to say Je vais mourir (I'm going to die). Cruz lost consciousness and was transported to a hospital but pronounced dead on arrival. BEI has opened an inquiry. |
| 2025-04-20 | unidentified teen boy (16) | Ontario (Toronto) | Toronto Police Service | Police pulled over a vehicle for a traffic violation. After five people exited the vehicle, a teen boy remained and "pulls out a semi-automatic pistol, firing toward the officer". Two TPS officers discharged between 24 and 27 rounds, killing the teen. |
| 2025-04-24 | unidentified male (30) | Ontario (Mississauga) | Peel Regional Police | Police shot and killed a man at Toronto Pearson International Airport while responding to calls of a person in distress. Police said the man produced a firearm, and three officers shot him. |
| 2025-07-07 | Unidentified male (60s) | British Columbia (Surrey) | Surrey RCMP | Surrey RCMP responded to reports of an assault at a home, where a woman and man in their 60s lived together. When confronted by a man with a weapon, police shot him dead. A woman was found dead inside the home. |
| 2025-09-21 | Nooran Rezayi (15) | Quebec (Longueuil) | SPAL | |
| 2025-12-05 | Unidentified male (33) | Ontario (Greater Sudbury) | Greater Sudbury Police Service | An officer responding to a home burglary fatally shot a suspect after he smashed a police vehicle's windshield with an axe and charged the officer. |
| 2025-12-06 | Unidentified male | Ontario (Toronto) | Toronto Police Service | Police responded to reports of a man armed with a gun at the Danforth GO Station in the early morning. When officers arrived, there was an interaction, and one officer discharged his firearm at the man multiple times. He was transported to the hospital where he was pronounced deceased. A firearm believed to belong to the man was found. |
| 2025-12-11 | Unidentified male (19) | Ontario (Mississauga) | Peel Regional Police | Police received a call of an injured man at a residence. When police arrived, they found a 39-year-old suffering stab wounds. Police encountered a 19-year-old relative armed with an edged weapon. A taser was used before an officer shot him. The man was transported to hospital where he was later pronounced deceased. |
| 2025-12-20 | Alacie Iqaluk (6) | Quebec (Inukjuak) | Nunavik Police Service | Police were called to a home for a person posing danger to others. Officers shot and injured a man at the home who was allegedly armed with a rifle. Police also shot his daughter, Alacie, who was sleeping in bed with her mother when she was shot. |
| 2026-01-13 | Unidentified female | British Columbia (Burnaby) | RCMP | Police received a report of a woman in distress with weapons and shot her after an interaction. |
| 2026-01-13 | Darrell Augustine | Nova Scotia (Shubenacadie) | RCMP | |
| 2026-01-16 | Unidentified male (33) | Ontario (Branford) | Branford Police Service | |
| 2026-01-18 | Bronson Paul (40) | New Brunswick (Tobique First Nation) | RCMP | RCMP responded to a domestic dispute, where Bronson Paul advanced toward officers holding an "edged weapon". A taser was ineffective in stopping Paul, and he was shot dead by police. |
| 2026-01-27 | Christopher John Delaney (55) | Yukon (Whitehorse) | RCMP | |
| 2026-02-21 | Unidentified male (48) | Ontario (Paisley) | OPP | |
| 2026-02-28 | Unidentified male (44) | Ontario (Mississauga) | Peel Regional Police | |
| 2026-03-06 | Edward Essue (29) | Ontario (Innisfil) | Barrie Police Service | |
| 2026-03-09 | Nash Prystie (39) | Ontario (Kenora) | OPP | |
| 2026-03-14 | Unidentified male | Quebec (Saint-Raphaël) | SQ | |
| 2026-03-18 | Unidentified male (40) | Ontario (Windsor) | Windsor Police Service | |
| 2026-03-28 | Unidentified male | Nova Scotia (Tantallon) | Bridgewater Police Service | |
| 2026-04-15 | Unidentified | Quebec (Quebec City) | SPVQ | |
| 2026-05-22 | Unidentified male (35) | Ontario (Windsor) | Windsor Police Service | |
| 2026-05-29 | Unidentified male (34) | Manitoba (Winnipeg) | Winnipeg Police Service | |
| 2026-05-29 | Unidentified male | British Columbia (Surrey) | Surrey RCMP | |
| 2026-06-08 | Unidentified | British Columbia (Vancouver) | Vancouver Police Department | |
| 2026-06-19 | Unidentified male (26) | Manitoba (Winnipeg) | Winnipeg Police Service | |
| 2026-06-21 | Melanie Hambrook (53) | Alberta (Calgary) | Calgary Police Service | |
| 2026-06-22 | Seth Scott Hatfield (25) | Quebec (Montreal) | SPVM | 2026 Montreal shooting |
| 2026-06-25 | Unidentified | Alberta (Cold Lake) | RCMP | |
| 2026-06-26 | Unidentified male (59) | Alberta (Edmonton) | Edmonton Police Service | |
| 2026-07-13 | Unidentified male (42) | Manitoba (Winnipeg) | Winnipeg Police Service | |
| 2026-07-15 | Unidentified male | Alberta (Brooks) | RCMP | |
| 2026-07-21 | Unidentified male | British Columbia (Vancouver) | RCMP | |
| 2026-08-22 | Unidentified male (26) | Ontario (Toronto) | Toronto Police Service | Police responded to reports of a vehicle driving erratically. Officers found the driver, who was armed with a gun, and shot him after a confrontation. |
| 2026-09-20 | Ward, Sean (29) | Ontario (Belleville) | Belleville Police Service | Ward, a former soldier, shot a police constable outside of a synagogue on Yom Kippur. Ward was killed in the ensuing shootout, while the constable was injured. |

== See also ==
- Lists of killings by law enforcement officers
