= Paul Boyd (animator) =

American-born Canadian animator (1967–2007)

- Born: Paul Glenn Boyd; September 30, 1967; Pasadena, California, U.S.
- Died: August 13, 2007 (aged 39); Vancouver, British Columbia, Canada
- Years active: 1992–2007
- Known for: Ed, Edd n Eddy (title sequence); ¡Mucha Lucha!; Fetch! with Ruff Ruffman

Paul Glenn Boyd (September 30, 1967 – August 13, 2007) was an American-born Canadian animator.

== Early life ==
Boyd was born September 30, 1967, in Pasadena, California, to David, a mathematician, and Mary Boyd (née Shields) who was a nurse. He grew up in the west side of Vancouver, British Columbia, and showed an unusual gift for expression in the visual arts at a young age. Boyd attended Lord Byng Secondary School before moving on to University of British Columbia and Concordia University in Montreal.

== Career ==
Boyd began his career working for the animation company International Rocketship on two Gary Larson specials, before becoming a member of a.k.a. Cartoon, the production team for Cartoon Network's Ed, Edd n Eddy, where he worked as a title sequence animator and director. According to the animation industry website Cartoon Brew, other than Ed, Edd n Eddy, Boyd also provided animation for Gary Larson's Tales from the Far Side and the Flash animation television series ¡Mucha Lucha!, and co-directed Aaagh! It's the Mr. Hell Show! with Moose Pagen, for which he was nominated an Annie Award in 2001.

During the 1990s, Boyd taught many young animators at the Vancouver Film School. A prize in his honour for the top student in Classical Animation at the Vancouver Film School is funded by his family and presented three times per year. His last completed work was on two animated advertisements for the Alberta Government.

== Personal life ==
For the last 15 years of Boyd's life, he had a successful career as an animator, and was employed by a number of animation studios in Vancouver; at the time of his death, he was working at the Global Mechanic studio.

While in his 20s, Boyd was diagnosed with bipolar disorder, an illness for which he received constant and usually effective treatment. He lived with this illness for almost 20 years.

== Death ==
External videos
- Bystander video of Boyd's encounter with Vancouver PD
- "Death of Paul Boyd", Vancouver Sun via YouTube on YouTube

On August 13, 2007, Boyd was shot and killed by Vancouver police officer Lee Chipperfield. A video recorded by tourists showed Boyd being shot nine times after wielding what was believed to be a bicycle chain, but other witnesses state it was a chain of paperclips, at officers who came to respond to a disturbance involving him. The ninth shot that struck Boyd was fired as he was on the ground. Chipperfield was allowed to return to work the next day. The use of force was criticized by many of Boyd's colleagues and relatives.

=== Investigation ===
The fatal shooting incident was investigated by the Vancouver Police Department and their findings passed on to the Criminal Justice Branch of BC which decided not to prosecute Chipperfield. After a Coroner's Inquest in December 2010 revealed many details which did not figure in the Criminal Justice Branch report, a complaint was filed by the British Columbia Civil Liberties Association to the Office of the Police Complaints Commissioner alleging that excessive force had been used. In March 2012, the British Columbia Police Complaint Commissioner issued a report concluding that there was not "clear, convincing and cogent evidence... that Chipperfield used unnecessary force or excessive force during this incident." He based his conclusion partly on an opinion provided by a use-of-force expert, Bill Lewinski, who suggested that Chipperfield could have been experiencing inattentional blindness due to his heightened emotional state, thereby failing to notice that Boyd had already been disarmed.

In May 2012, a video captured by a tourist's video camera surfaced. In the video, which starts just as a burst of two shots was fired (the 7th and 8th shots), Boyd is seen crawling on the road, unarmed. In the time between the eighth and ninth (fatal) shot, an officer is seen standing near Boyd handling an object that analysis of the video showed to be a chain and throwing it to one side thus providing evidence that Boyd was unarmed at the time the fatal shot was fired. David Eby, executive director of the B. C. Civil Liberties Association, said that the video made it clear that Boyd did not pose a threat to anyone at the time the fatal bullet was fired. In light of the new evidence, an independent investigative agency, the Alberta Serious Incident Response Team (ASIRT), was asked by the Attorney General of British Columbia to review the case with the new video in consideration.

In a June 25, 2013, media statement, the Criminal Justice Branch announced that ASIRT had completed its investigation and on June 24, 2013, the Assistant Deputy Attorney General, M. Joyce DeWitt-Van Oosten, had appointed a prominent Vancouver lawyer, Mark Jetté, as special prosecutor to decide on the basis of ASIRT's report and further investigation, if necessary, if charges would be laid against any of the officers involved in the incident. If a decision were made to prosecute then Mr. Jetté would conduct the prosecution. M. DeWitt-Van Oosten concluded that it was necessary to appoint a Special Prosecutor to avoid any potential for real or perceived improper influence in the administration of criminal justice in reviewing the ASIRT report. The BCCLA applauded the B.C. government for their June 2013 decision to appoint a Special Prosecutor to reconsider laying charges in the Boyd case. (In December 2010, following the conclusion of the Coroner's Inquest, the British Columbia Civil Liberties Association had called for a Special Prosecutor to be appointed but this request was rejected at that time).

On October 28, 2013, the Criminal Justice Branch announced that the special prosecutor had decided that no charges would be laid against Chipperfield in this case. Because the intent of Chipperfield's actions, i.e. to shoot and kill Boyd, was not in dispute the only charge that would have been appropriate was one of second degree murder. However, the prosecutor reasoned that the defense of self-defense would likely succeed because of the requirement that the prosecution establish beyond a reasonable doubt that Chipperfield knew he was shooting an unarmed and severely wounded man who did not pose a threat of death or serious injury to Chipperfield or others. Some of the police officers and civilian witnesses present at the time of the fatal shot testified that Boyd was crawling at the time he was killed and did not present a threat to any other person. Others testified that although he was crawling he did present a threat, and still others said that he was walking and upright up until the final shot. There was similar differing testimony regarding whether or not he was armed. While the video may support some of these testimonies more than others, as a whole they could be used by the defense to attempt to establish that a reasonable person could believe that Boyd posed a threat at the time of his death.

== Memorial ==
The Ed, Edd n Eddy episode "May I Have This Ed? / Look Before You Ed!" is dedicated in Boyd's memory and features a memorial at the end of the episode stating, "Paul Boyd 1967-2007. We miss you, you big lug!".

== See also ==
- Reasonable doubt
- List of killings by law enforcement officers in Canada
