= Serious Incident Response Team =

Canadian police oversight agency

- Abbreviation: SiRT
- Formation: December, 2010 (legislation), April 20, 2012 (operational)
- Type: Civilian Oversight
- Purpose: "To investigate all matters that involve death, serious injury, sexual assault and domestic violence or other matters of significant public interest that may have arisen from the actions of any police officer in Nova Scotia."
- Headquarters: Suite 203, 1256 Barrington St., Halifax
- Region served: Nova Scotia
- Director: The Honourable Felix Cacchione, Director
- Website: SiRT Site

The Serious Incident Response Team is the civilian oversight agency in Nova Scotia, Canada responsible for the investigation of incidents resulted in serious injury or death to any person, sexual assault and domestic violence allegations and other significant public interest matters concerning the police. SiRT has jurisdiction over all municipal police officers and Royal Canadian Mounted Police "H" Division officers, and for all complaints whether on- or off-duty related.

== Organization ==
SiRT is headed by a civilian director, who has never been a police officer. The Director is responsible for the overall operations of the agency, and to review all investigative reports. The Director has the sole power to determine whether any charges will be laid against subject officers, unless the Director is on leave. During his absence, a specially-trained Crown Counsel is appointed as the Acting Director to decide whether charges are laid.

SiRT is one of the three investigative oversight agencies for police in Canada (the other being the Independent Investigation Unit of Manitoba and Alberta Serious Incident Response Team) to have current sworn police officers from the Province appointed as investigators. On the other hand, the Special Investigation Unit of Ontario, the Independent Investigations Office of British Columbia, and the Bureau des enquêtes indépendantes of Quebec prohibits serving police officers from their respective provinces from being appointed as an investigator.

SiRT investigators are peace officers, and have the same powers as police officers in Nova Scotia under section 26G of the Police Act.

SiRT is a member of the Canadian Association for Civilian Oversight of Law Enforcement (CACOLE).

== Jurisdiction ==
SiRT is the third civilian investigative oversight agency for police in Canada (after the Special Investigations Unit & Alberta Serious Incident Response Team). Its jurisdiction extends to all serving police officers regardless of agency. However, it does not investigate other provincial (known as "Special Constables" under the Police Act), municipal law enforcement officers or civil constables appointed under the Police Services Act.

The Province of Prince Edward Island refers matter that would fall under SiRT mandate in Nova Scotia to the Director for investigation.

== Mandate ==
SiRT investigates all serious incidents where death or serious injuries may have been the result of police action. Further, the SiRT has the mandate to investigate sexual assault and domestic violence committed by any police officers in Nova Scotia. The Minister of Justice and Attorney General, a Chief of Police or on the Director's own motion, SiRT also investigate matters of significant public interest stemming from the actions of a police officer.

SiRT accepts complaint from the general public, provided the incident took place after the operational date of the agency (April 20, 2012).

== See also ==
- 2020 Nova Scotia attacks, a 2020 incident in which police stopped the perpetrator
