= Toronto shooting =

Toronto shooting may refer to:

- Shooting of Edmond Yu, a police shooting of a mentally ill man in 1997
- Boxing Day shooting, a gang-related shooting in 2005
- Eaton Centre shooting, a shooting in June 2012
- Danzig Street shooting, a gang-related shooting in July 2012
- 2018 Toronto shooting, a mass shooting
- 2025 Toronto pub shooting, a mass shooting
- 2026 Salsa on St. Clair festival shooting, a mass shooting

== See also ==
- 1975 Brampton Centennial Secondary School shooting, which occurred in Brampton in the Greater Toronto Area
- Toronto attack (disambiguation)
