= Death of Eishia Hudson =

2020 police shooting in Winnipeg, Canada

Eishia Hudson
- Born: Eishia Loletta Hudson; June 2, 2003; Winnipeg, Manitoba, Canada
- Died: April 8, 2020 (aged 16); Winnipeg, Manitoba, Canada
- Cause of death: Gunshot wound
- Parent(s): Christie Zebrasky; William Hudson

Eishia Loretta Hudson (June 2, 2003 – April 8, 2020) was a teenage Indigenous person who was shot by the Winnipeg Police Service following a robbery, car chase and collision. She later succumbed to her wounds. After her death, there was public outrage and rallies against police brutality towards indigenous peoples.

== Biography ==
Eishia Loletta Hudson was born in Winnipeg, Manitoba, on June 2, 2003, to parents Christie Zebrasky and William Hudson. She was raised by her paternal grandmother in Berens River, Manitoba, until moving to Winnipeg at the age of eight to live with her mother.

== Background ==
On April 8, 2020, Winnipeg Police were called to a liquor store after it was reported that multiple suspects allegedly stole alcohol from the store, and took off in a stolen vehicle. An officer recognized the stolen vehicle and began following it down Lagimodiere Boulevard. The vehicle which was an SUV then rammed into a police cruiser and a car chase ensued. While in pursuit, the stolen vehicle collided with multiple other vehicles. Hudson was driving the vehicle with four other suspects inside. After the vehicle Hudson was driving crashed, police attempted to arrest them, she then tried to reverse the vehicle and at that point she was shot. Hudson was transported to hospital in critical condition and later died. The four other occupants in the vehicle were charged with robbery and other offences.

== Aftermath ==
In response to Hudson's death, the Indigenous Bar Association pushed the Manitoba government for an independent inquiry into her death. On June 19, 2020, more than a thousand people gathered at the Manitoba Legislative Building for a rally to honour Hudson. Wab Kinew and Leah Gazan attended the rally.

On January 28, 2021, the Independent Investigation Unit of Manitoba revealed that the unnamed officer who fatally shot Hudson would not be facing any charges. Later that day at a press conference, Hudson’s father called for a public inquiry into police related deaths of Indigenous peoples.

In December 2021, Hudson’s family filed a wrongful death lawsuit against the city of Winnipeg.

== See also ==
- List of killings by law enforcement officers in Canada
