= Toronto attack =

The Toronto Attack are a Canadian junior ice hockey team.

Toronto attack or attack on Toronto may also refer to:

== Attacks ==
- 2018 Toronto van attack, vehicle-ramming attack
- Litton Industries bombing (1982)

=== Attempted attacks ===
- 1991 Toronto bomb plot
- 2006 Ontario terrorism plot

== See also ==
- Battle of Montgomery's Tavern (1837), part of the Upper Canada Rebellion
- Battle of York (1813), part of the War of 1812
- Toronto shooting (disambiguation)
