= South Simcoe Police Service =

- Common name: South Simcoe Police
- Abbreviation: SSPS
- Motto: Protect with Courage, Serve with Compassion

Jurisdictional structure
- Operations jurisdiction: Simcoe County, Canada
- General nature: Local civilian police

Operational structure
- Headquarters: North Division/Headquarters 2137 Innisfil Beach Road Innisfil, ON L9S 1A2 South Division 81 Melbourne Drive Bradford, ON L3Z 1M2
- Elected officer responsible: Hon. Michael Kerzner, Solicitor General of Ontario
- Agency executives: John Van Dyke, Chief of Police; Chris Landry, Deputy Chief

Website
- www.southsimcoepolice.on.ca

South Simcoe Police Service is a municipal police force in Ontario, Canada, providing service to the municipalities of Innisfil and Bradford West Gwillimbury. It came into existence on January 1, 1997, through the amalgamation of the Innisfil Police Service and Bradford West Gwillimbury Police Service. The neighbouring Barrie Police Service was part of the initial proposal but did not participate in the amalgamation.

The chief of police from 1997 to 2011 was Bruce J Davis. On April 16, 2012, Rick Beazley was appointed chief; he had been the chief of the Strathroy-Caradoc Police Service. The current chief is Andrew Fletcher who joined the service in 2015.

South Simcoe Police has 94 officers and 43 civilian staff members. The police service also has a complement of 30 auxiliary officers. The service is now responding to a growth of population in the areas of policing services it provides and is in the process of hiring several uniform and civilian personnel. Several new communities are experiencing unprecedented growth including the bedroom community of Friday Harbour in the northern part of Innisfil. The town of Innisfil is also witnessing growth in towns such as Innisfil proper, Alcona, Lefroy, Sandy Cove, Churchill and Cookstown. The attraction of a Sandy Cove Harbourfront Centre is currently in discussion along with a massive infrastructure project called "The Orbit" which will be within the centre of a new GO Station Transit Hub. On November 8, 2021, the Ontario provincial government announced the approval of the Bradford 400-404 Highway Bypass which will serve to link both highways for the first time. The infrastructure project will become the impetus for additional growth with a concomitant demand for policing services.

The town of Bradford West Gwillimbury is also experiencing a surge in popularity and population growth that will increase demand for policing services both as a proactive and reactive response to the community needs in accordance to its motto to "Protect with Courage, Serve with Compassion". With the growth of population in Bradford and Bond Head along with close proximity to York Region, police service calls for service continue to increase. In 2020, the service announced it hired its first ever full-time crime analyst in response to the need to provide its service members access to high quality intelligence and tactical information. The service enjoys a positive relationship with its community members and are observed as a service that perpetuates an intelligence-led and community driven approach to crime solvability. On October 11, 2022, 2 officers of the service, Constables Devon Northrup and Morgan Russell were severely hurt on duty and despite the efforts in saving them, they died of their injuries.

== Divisions ==
The police service operates out of two divisions. The South Division is based in a building located at 81 Melbourne Drive in Bradford; it opened in January 2008 and houses most of the administration staff, criminal investigations branch, identification bureau, communications, crime analysis and uniform patrol. The North Division is located at 2137 Innisfil Beach Road in Innisfil. The Services Traffic and Marine Unit, Victims of Crime (VCARS) and uniform patrol operate out of this building. A community office was located at the Cookstown Outlet Mall at Highways 400 and 89 but closed in early 2013.

The Marine Unit is patrols the shores and waters of Lake Simcoe, notably most of the southside of Kempenfelt Bay and west side of Cook's Bay.

== Special function bureaus ==
The police service operates several special function bureaus which include a canine unit, Emergency Response Unit, Criminal Investigations, Forensic Identification Unit, Crime Analysis and a traffic & marine unit.

== Community activity and diversification ==
The police service is aware of the diversification of its communities as they continue to attract persons from all walks of life who seek a safe and respectful community to work, live and operate within. In 2021, the police service raised the Rainbow Pride flag at its North and South Divisions for the first time in its history. The community response was overwhelmingly positive and was attended by Chief Andrew Fletcher, Deputy Chief John Van Dyke, Inspector Sheryl Sutton, several South Simcoe police and civilian staff along with several members from partner and neighbouring services including the OPP, Barrie Police Service and York Regional Police. The initiative was driven by its internal members from the Diversity, Equity and Inclusion Unit and was praised for its innovation and awareness to the sensitives of growing communities. It was also hailed as a clear indicator of the progressive and modern approach in the services modernization.
