= Independent Investigations Office =

Police oversight agency in British Columbia, Canada

- Abbreviation: IIO
- Formation: September 10, 2012 (operational)
- Type: Civilian Oversight
- Purpose: Conduct investigations into officer-related incidents of death or serious harm in order to determine whether or not an officer may have committed an offence
- Headquarters: 12th Floor, 13450-102nd Avenue, Surrey, British Columbia
- Region served: British Columbia
- Chief Civilian Director: Jessica Berglund, BA JD
- Website: IIOBC

The Independent Investigations Office (IIO) is the civilian oversight agency in British Columbia, Canada responsible for examining and investigating incidents involving on or off duty municipal police officers, Stl’atl’imx Tribal Police Service, Metro Vancouver Transit Police, Royal Canadian Mounted Police officers based in BC, Special Provincial Constables, Special Municipal Constables as well as Auxiliary & Reserve Constables that result in death or serious harm.

== History ==
The IIO was created in September 2012 under the BC Ministry of Justice in response to Braidwood Inquiry recommendations provided to the Government of BC by Justices Braidwood and Davies which indicated the need for an independent province-wide oversight agency to increase transparency and accountability of police oversight for the public. The agency is modeled after the Ontario Special Investigations Unit, the first civilian investigatory oversight agency in Canada. IIO is the 4th investigatory oversight agency of the police after the Special Investigations Unit, the Alberta Serious Incident Response Team and Nova Scotia's Serious Incident Response Team.

== Organization ==
The agency is based in Surrey, British Columbia and is currently led by Chief Civilian Director Jessica Berglund. The director of the IIO is a civilian position and the holder is required to have never served as a police officer. The agency itself consists of teams of investigators who may not have served as a police officer within the past five years. The Chief Civilian Director and each of the investigators are peace officers with the same powers as a police officer. Investigators without a criminal investigation background are trained at the Justice Institute of British Columbia.

IIO is a member of the Canadian Association for Civilian Oversight of Law Enforcement (CACOLE).

== Mandate ==
Unlike the SIU or ASIRT, the IIO does not lay charges against those who may have committed an offence. In British Columbia, law enforcement agencies forward their investigative reports to Crown Counsel. If the charges meet the Charge Assessment Guidelines, Crown Counsel will approve the charges. Where Crown decides against approving charges against an IIO matter, a "clear statement" is issued by the BC Criminal Justice Branch outlining the reasons of not approving the charges.

Complaints that do not involve serious injury or death are not handled by the IIO. These complaints are referred to the appropriate oversight agency, such as the BC Office of the Police Complaint Commissioner, the Civilian Review and Complaints Commission for the RCMP or the Military Police Complaints Commission.

== Notable investigations ==
- Killing of Merhdad Bayrami
- Killing of Jared Lowndes
