= Shooting of Edmond Yu =

1997 police killing in Toronto, Canada

- Date: February 20, 1997
- Location: Toronto, Ontario, Canada; 43.638420°N 79.391719°W
- Type: Fatal shooting
- Participants: Edmond Yu (death); Lou Pasquino (shooter)
- Charges: None filed

Edmond Wai-Hong Yu (余偉康; October 2, 1961 – February 20, 1997) was a Hong Kong Canadian former medical student whose death after being shot by a constable of the Toronto Police Service sparked debates about the police's use of force, mental illness, and the treatment of those diagnosed with a mental illness and struggle with homelessness.

== Early life and mental illness ==
Yu was raised in Hong Kong and immigrated to Canada in 1982. While young, Edmond won the Hong Kong city boxing championship. He attended York University from 1982 to 1984, studying pre-medicine. In 1984 he was accepted as a medical student at the University of Toronto.

In 1985, police arrested Yu and took him to the Clark Institute of Psychiatry, where he was diagnosed with paranoid schizophrenia and later on became homeless.

== Death ==
On February 20, 1997, Yu assaulted a woman at a bus stop, then boarded a bus. Police attempted to board the bus, at which point Yu, according to witnesses, raised a small hammer. Constable Lou Pasquino fired six shots, hitting Yu three times.

An official inquest in 1998–1999 cleared the police of wrongdoing and resulted in a number of recommendations. The inquest concluded, "Housing is a mental health issue and the absence of decent housing is a major determinant of health."

A foundation to fund "a housing project for homeless men with mental health problems" has been set up in Edmond Yu's name. There have been a number of other memorials to Yu, such as Edmond Place (part of Parkdale Activity-Recreation Centre, which claims to be "a low-stress, high support, and non-medical organization for psychiatric survivors of the Mental Health System who also experience homelessness and would be considered 'hard to house' people", and The Edmond Yu Project.

David Hawkins made a documentary on Yu, The Death and Life of Edmond Yu, and Laura Sky made a documentary as well, Crisis Call.
