= Independent Investigation Unit =

- Abbreviation: IIU
- Formation: June 18, 2015
- Type: civilian oversight
- Purpose: Investigates serious incidents involving the police
- Headquarters: 700 – 155 Carlton Street, Winnipeg
- Region served: Manitoba
- Civilian director: Bruce Sychuk (acting status)
- Website: IIU

The Independent Investigation Unit is the civilian oversight agency in Manitoba, Canada responsible for the investigation of incidents resulted in serious injury or death to any person. IIU has jurisdiction over all municipal police officers, First Nations police officers and Royal Canadian Mounted Police "D" Division officers, for all complaints on or off duty related.

== Organization ==
IIU was created as a result of the recommendations from the Taman Inquiry. The Manitoba government amended the legislation governing police services in 2009 to pave way for the creation of the IIU.

IIU is headed by the civilian director (CD), who cannot be a current or past police officer. They are responsible for reviewing all investigative reports. Once an investigation is completed, the report is forwarded to the civilian director. The report is not made public, except in criminal or civil lawsuits, and in disciplinary proceedings or inquires into death by the Medical Examiner. The CD may choose to directly lay charges if they determine the subject officer has committed an offence, or could refer the matter to Crown Counsel for charge assessment. If prosecution is commenced, section 68(2) of The Police Services Act requires the prosecutor to be from another province.

IIU is one of the three investigative oversight agencies for police in Canada (the other being the Alberta Serious Incident Response Team & Nova Scotia's Serious Incident Response Team) to have current sworn police officers from the Province appointed as investigators. On the other hand, the Special Investigation Unit of Ontario, the Independent Investigations Office of British Columbia, and the Bureau des enquêtes indépendantes of Quebec prohibits serving police officers from their respective provinces from being appointed as an investigator.

Civilian investigators are appointed as peace officer, and a police constable under section 63 of The Police Services Act.

IIU is a member of the Canadian Association for Civilian Oversight of Law Enforcement (CACOLE).

== Jurisdiction ==
IIU is the fifth investigative oversight agency for police in Canada, after Ontario, Alberta, Nova Scotia & British Columbia. Its jurisdiction extends to all serving police officers regardless of agency. However, it does not investigate other provincial or municipal law enforcement officers (known as "Special Constable" under The Police Services Act).

== Mandate ==
IIU investigates all incidents where death or serious injuries may have been the result of police action. Further, the IIU has the mandate to investigate complaints from chiefs of police services alleging that police officers committed an offence under certain sections of the Criminal Code. They include perjury, obstructing justice, fabricating evidence, and giving contradictory evidence.

IIU does not accept complaints from the general public. Unlike other similar oversight agencies in Canada, a civilian monitor may be appointed by the Manitoba Police Commission to monitor the progress of the investigation, and to report back to the commission.
