= Alberta Serious Incident Response Team =

Division of the Canadian justice system

- Abbreviation: ASIRT
- Formation: 2008
- Type: Civilian Oversight
- Purpose: "Investigate incidents or complaints involving serious injury or death of any person, and matters of a serious or sensitive nature, that may have resulted from the actions of a police officer."
- Headquarters: Edmonton & Calgary
- Region served: Alberta
- Executive Director: Michael Ewenson, KC
- Website: ASIRT

The Alberta Serious Incident Response Team is the civilian oversight agency in Alberta, Canada responsible for the investigation of incidents resulted in serious injury or death to any person, as well as serious or sensitive allegations of police misconduct. ASIRT has jurisdiction over all municipal police officers and Royal Canadian Mounted Police "K" Division officers, and for all complaints whether on or off duty related.

== Organization ==
ASIRT has two offices—one in Edmonton, the other in Calgary. The Executive Director heads the agency, and is responsible for reviewing all investigative reports and liaise with Crown Counsel, if there are reasonable grounds to determine an offense may have been committed, to determine whether charges will be laid against the subject officer.

ASIRT is one of the three investigative oversight agencies for police in Canada (the other being the Independent Investigation Unit of Manitoba and Nova Scotia's Serious Incident Response Team) to have current sworn police officers from the Province appointed as investigators. On the other hand, the Special Investigation Unit of Ontario, the Independent Investigations Office of British Columbia, and the Bureau des enquêtes indépendantes of Quebec prohibits serving police officers from their respective provinces from being appointed as an investigator.

Besides management, administrative and support staff, there are 11 civilian investigators and 11 police officer investigators. 7 are from the Royal Canadian Mounted Police, 2 from Edmonton Police Service, 2 from Calgary Police Service and 1 from Canadian Forces Military Police. Civilian investigators are appointed as Peace Officers under Section 46.2(1)(2)(b) of the Police Act.

ASIRT is a member of the Canadian Association for Civilian Oversight of Law Enforcement (CACOLE).

== Jurisdiction ==
ASIRT is the second investigative oversight agency for police in Canada, after the Ontario Special Investigation Unit. Its jurisdiction extends to all serving police officers regardless of agency. However, it does not investigate other provincial or municipal law enforcement officers (known as "Peace Officers" under Alberta statues).

ASIRT has entered into Memorandums of Understanding to also investigate police incident in Yukon, as well as complaints against Canadian Forces Military Police that are stationed in Alberta. Further, ASIRT has on occasion investigated matters in Manitoba and Newfoundland and Labrador, at the request of the respective provincial governments.

== Mandate ==
ASIRT does not accept complaints from the general public, and can only accept cases as assigned by the Director of Law Enforcement. The agency can either take the role as the lead investigative agency, be the overseer of an investigation conducted by a police agency, a reviewer of a RCMP investigation, or take part as both the overseer and reviewer. Once an investigation is completed, the report is forwarded to the Executive Director. The report is not made public.

While all Canadian investigative oversight agency of the police investigate into incidents where serious harm or death as a result of police action, ASIRT has the additional mandate to investigate matters that are "Sensitive Allegations of Police Misconduct" - fraud, Breach of trust, sexual assault, aggravated assault by an officer or potential systemic racism and systemic corruption issues.
