= Law enforcement in British Columbia, 2005 =

- Reported crimes in BC
Category	2005	Δ 2004
Violent crime	51,671	↑3%
Homicide	98	↓13%
Attempted murder	107	↑23%
Non-Sexual assault	42,941	↑3%
Sexual assault	3,794	↑2%
Robbery	4,619	↑2%
Abduction	112	↓13%
Property crime	265,246	↓6%
Theft	158,701	↓7%
Break and enter	49,611	↓6%
Motor vehicle theft	34,800	↓8%
Fraud	15,315	↓1%
Possession of stolen goods	6,819	↓8%
Drug crime	25,810	↓4%
cannabis	16,237	↓10%
Cocaine	6,515	↑8%
Heroin	586	↑6%
Other drugs	2,472	↑11%
Other crimes	191,354	↓1%
Vandalism	61,727	↓1%
Disturbing the peace	48,667	↑8%
Counterfeit	20,124	↓15%
Offensive weapons	5,369	↑6%
Harassment	4,388	↑0.3%
Arson	2,912	↑4%
Prostitution	1,801	↓12%
Other	37,810	↓2%

This is a list of statistics in law enforcement in British Columbia in 2005, including crime rates, police strength, and police costs. In total there were 508,271 reported (non-traffic) incidents of Criminal Code offences, giving the province a crime rate of 120 offences per 1,000 people, the second highest in Canada. This was down 5% from 2004's rate of 125, and was the first decrease since 1999–2000. Of these crimes, only 22% were solved in the same year, including 52% of all violent crimes and 13% of all property crimes. This resulted in 57,817 persons being recommended for charges to the Crown counsel, of which 81% were male and 10% were young offenders (between 12 and 17 years old).

Law enforcement was supplied mainly by municipal forces, either an independent police department or the Royal Canadian Mounted Police (RCMP). Municipalities with populations over 5,000 people using the RCMP paid either 90% or 70% of their costs, depending on their population size, with the federal government paying the remainder. Those municipalities under 5,000 people shared a detachment with the general rural area but did not pay any of the policing costs while the unincorporated rural areas paid a small, varied, amount through a general rural property tax. Other police forces operating within BC include 2 First Nations forces, a RCMP federal force, the Greater Vancouver Transportation Authority Police Service (now South Coast British Columbia Transportation Authority Police Service), the Organized Crime Agency (Combined Forces Special Enforcement Unit), Conservation Officer Service, the Canadian National and Canadian Pacific railway police forces, and various municipal bylaw enforcement officers.

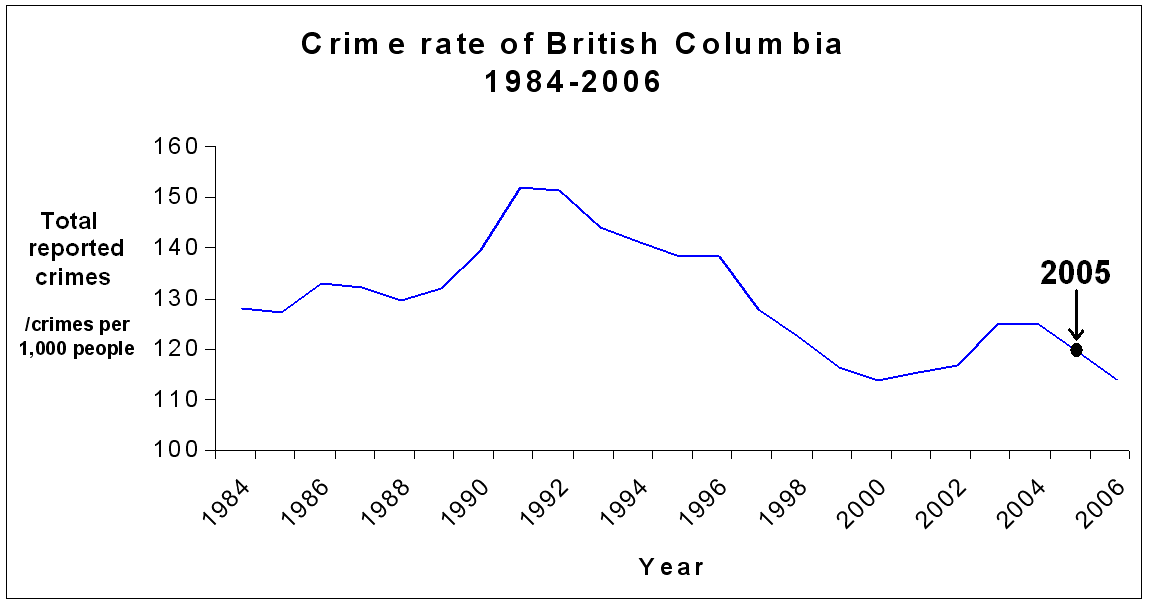
Trend in overall crime rate.

In the following tables crime rates refer to the number of incidents of Criminal Code offences, excluding traffic offences, per 1,000 people. If an incident involved more than one offense, only the most serious was recorded in these statistics. The population figures were based on the 2001 Canadian census and estimated for 2005. These populations only include permanent residents, so municipalities with high numbers of visitors (from the rural areas, commuters, tourists, seasonal workers, etc.) are not counted and will result in a higher crime rate. The total costs are the actual costs of police services at year end, not the budgeted costs. The case burden reflects the workload of each office: the number of offences, excluding traffic offenes, per officer.

== Municipal detachments ==
The 11 municipalities that operated their own police department paid 100% of the total costs. Their number of officers, policies and priorities were set by a municipally-appointed police board. The 59 municipalities which contracted their police duties to the RCMP "E" Division had their officers operate under provincial or federal policies and priorities. Of the municipalities which have population over 15,000 people paid 90% and municipalities between 5,000 and 15,000 people paid 70% with the federal government paying the rest.

Low Medium-low Medium-high High

Municipality	Population	Police officers	Residents per officer	Total costs (2005)	Cost per capita	Case burden	Crime rate per 1,000 people	Police force
Abbotsford	128,165	187	685	$25,520,478	$199	81	118	Abbotsford Police Department
Burnaby	204,320	253	808	$32,596,229	$160	100	123	RCMP
Campbell River	30,810	40	770	$5,317,313	$173	137	178	RCMP
Castlegar	7,821	11	711	$1,115,574	$143	107	150	RCMP
Central Saanich	16,821	21	801	$3,044,111	$181	39	49	Central Saanich Police
Chilliwack	73,066	91	803	$11,237,991	$154	140	174	RCMP
Coldstream	10,102	7	1,443	$700,116	$69	54	38	RCMP
Colwood	15,253	16	953	$1,451,199	$95	73	74	RCMP
Comox	12,706	10	1,271	$957,851	$75	69	56	RCMP
Coquitlam	121,989	127	961	$16,899,493	$139	96	100	RCMP
Courtenay	21,801	26	838	$3,203,859	$147	155	182	RCMP
Cranbrook	19,774	24	824	$3,138,148	$159	108	131	RCMP
Dawson Creek	11,394	22	518	$2,444,888	$215	116	225	RCMP
Delta	102,661	74	680	$21,041,163	$205	80	151	Delta Police Department
Fort St. John	17,781	26	684	$3,785,705	$213	156	228	RCMP
Hope	6,591	13	507	$1,104,141	$168	91	180	RCMP
Kamloops	82,714	118	701	$14,967,841	$181	118	168	RCMP
Kelowna	109,490	131	836	$16,296,738	$149	125	150	RCMP
Kimberley	7,049	9	783	$669,599	$95	60	77	RCMP
Kitimat	10,587	15	706	$1,570,909	$148	49	70	RCMP
Ladysmith	7,292	7	1,042	$692,991	$95	85	81	RCMP
Lake Country	10,367	9	1,152	$734,960	$71	104	90	RCMP
Langford	21,845	24	910	$3,413,120	$156	102	112	RCMP
Langley (city)	25,716	9	584	$6,094,919	$237	102	176	RCMP
Langley (township)	97,682	123	794	$16,383,242	$168	86	108	RCMP
Mackenzie	5,454	8	682	$769,836	$141	74	108	RCMP
Maple Ridge	73,531	79	931	$11,164,050	$152	127	136	RCMP
Merritt	7,561	13	582	$1,184,129	$157	133	228	RCMP
Mission	34,742	47	739	$6,353,430	$183	125	169	RCMP
Nanaimo	79,898	114	701	$14,638,272	$183	125	178	RCMP
Nelson	9,797	17	576	$1,968,065	$201	80	139	Nelson Police Department
New Westminster	57,480	107	537	$15,890,669	$276	87	162	New Westminster Police Service
North Cowichan	28,519	28	1,019	$3,618,925	$127	100	98	RCMP
North Saanich	11,274	10	1,127	$945,598	$84	38	34	RCMP
North Vancouver (city)	47,131	64	736	$8,778,016	$186	86	117	RCMP
North Vancouver (district)	88,461	91	972	$11,745,082	$133	65	67	RCMP
Oak Bay	18,313	22	832	$3,561,807	$194	54	65	Oak Bay Police Department
Parksville	11,709	13	901	$1,160,543	$99	156	174	RCMP
Penticton	33,061	42	787	$5,078,972	$154	130	165	RCMP
Pitt Meadows	16,673	19	878	$2,006,575	$120	89	101	RCMP
Port Alberni	18,688	34	550	$4,656,790	$249	115	210	RCMP
Port Coquitlam	57,569	59	976	$7,681,729	$133	109	112	RCMP
Port Moody	28,458	40	711	$5,786,943	$203	47	67	Port Moody Police Department
Powell River	13,831	18	768	$1,916,311	$139	88	114	RCMP
Prince George	77,148	121	638	$15,524,482	$201	114	179	RCMP
Prince Rupert	14,974	36	416	$3,183,766	$213	85	204	RCMP
Qualicum Beach	8,807	6	1,468	$466,878	$53	118	81	RCMP
Quesnel	10,487	20	524	$2,716,970	$259	124	237	RCMP
Revelstoke	7,964	11	724	$982,406	$123	76	105	RCMP
Richmond	173,429	94	908	$26,291,594	$152	85	191	RCMP
Saanich	110,386	57	751	$9,423,610	$176	43	67	Saanich Police Department
Salmon Arm	17,000	17	1,000	$1,764,177	$104	103	103	RCMP
Sechelt	8,901	10	890	$904,999	$102	85	96	RCMP
Sidney	11,862	14	847	$1,286,671	$108	46	54	RCMP
Smithers	5,509	9	612	$939,155	$170	184	301	RCMP
Sooke	10,117	10	1,012	$999,748	$99	93	92	RCMP
Spallumcheen	5,707	3	1,902	$267,897	$47	87	46	RCMP
Squamish	15,922	25	637	$2,966,182	$186	130	204	RCMP
Summerland	11,405	9	1,267	$789,709	$69	86	68	RCMP
Surrey	393,256	552	712	$65,595,991	$167	90	127	RCMP
Terrace	12,556	25	502	$2,310,847	$184	103	206	RCMP
Trail	7,889	12	657	$1,346,353	$171	97	147	RCMP
Vancouver	584,701	1,174	498	$170,157,141	$291	58	117	Vancouver Police Department
Vernon	36,232	49	739	$5,971,747	$165	123	167	RCMP
Victoria	94,525	215	440	$31,063,866	$329	82	186	Victoria Police Department, includes Esquimalt
View Royal	8,382	8	1,048	$964,990	$115	88	87	RCMP
West Vancouver	46,595	79	590	$10,345,528	$222	35	60	West Vancouver Police Department
Whistler	9,775	23	425	$2,969,015	$304	86	202	RCMP
White Rock	19,577	23	851	$3,127,281	$160	72	84	RCMP
Williams Lake	11,872	23	516	$2,074,987	$175	130	252	RCMP
Average			687		$192	85	120	

== Provincial detachments ==
The RCMP provincial force covers the 86 municipalities with populations below 5,000 people and the unincorporated rural areas surrounding all municipalities. These 112 detachments and 756 officers covered 720,443 people in a province of over 4.2 million people. The costs of policing were shared between the provincial government (70%) and the federal government (30%). These municipalities did not make any direct contribution but the rural areas had some of their property tax covering a small portion of the provincial share. In some cases the municipal forces and provincial forces operated from the same detachment and reported to the same commanding officer but their statistics were kept separate.

Policing in First Nation communities was done under one of three programs with the costs being shared between the provincial (46-48%) and federal (52-54%) governments. Under the First Nations Community Policing Services (FNCPS) 48 officers served the aboriginal communities throughout the province. Where no FNCPS agreement was made between the band and the provincial and federal governments the Aboriginal Community Constable Program had 36 First Nations officers serving the communities. There were two independent First Nations Administered Police Services (FNAPS), autonomous of the RCMP: the Kitasoo-Xaixais Public Safety Department and the Stl’atl’imx Tribal Police Service, with the Ditidaht First Nation Public Safety and Policing Services closing in 2004 (covered by the Lake Cowichan RCMP detachment in 2005).

Low Medium-low Medium-high High

Detachment	Population	Police officers	Residents per officer	Case burden	Crime rate per 1,000 people	other communities within jurisdiction
Agassiz	9,269	12	772	114	148	Kent, Harrison Hot Springs, Harrison Mills
Alert Bay	1,615	3	538	73	136	Sointula
Alexis Creek	2,041	4	510	76	148	Alexis Creek First Nation
Anahim Lake	1,111	4	227	84	303	Ulkatcho First Nation, Nimpo Lake
Armstrong	4,940	6	823	77	94	
Ashcroft	4,121	5	824	96	117	Cache Creek, Walhachin
Atlin	605	3	202	35	174	
Barriere	4,277	4	1,069	68	63	Heffley Cree
Bella Bella	1,492	5	298	119	400	Namu, Ocean Falls
Bella Coola	2,413	3	804	130	162	Hagensborg
Boston Bar	944	3	314	41	130	North Bend
Boundary	12,587	12	1,049	87	83	Grand Forks, Greenwood, Midway, Kettle Valley, Christina Lake
Bowen Island	3,441	2	1,720	74	43	
Burns Lake	7,346	10	735	177	240	
Campbell River^{[Α]}	5,305	7	758	88	116	Rural areas around Campbell River, Buttle Lake
Castlegar^{[Α]}	6,360	4	1,590	62	39	Rural areas around Castlegar
Chase	9,232	8	1,154	109	94	Pritchard, Sun Peaks
Chetwynd	6,204	9	689	109	158	Moberly Lake, East Pine
Chilliwack^{[Α]}	4,893	8	612	55	90	Rural areas around Chilliwack, Cultus Lake
Clearwater	5,837	5	1,167	83	71	Vavenby, Little Fort
Clinton	2,338	4	585	52	89	70 Mile House
Columbia Valley	10,133	12	844	117	138	Invermere, Radium Hot Springs, Canal Flats
Comox Valley	27,161	19	1,430	94	66	Cumberland, Fanny Bay, Royston, Union Bay
Coquitlam^{[Α]}	2,412	3	804	33	41	Rural areas north of Coquitlam
Cranbrook^{[Α]}	7,155	4	1,789	91	51	Rural areas around Cranbrook, Moyie, Fort Steele
Creston	13,871	12	1,156	33	81	Yahk, Riondel
Dawson Creek^{[Α]}	8,755	4	2,189	99	45	Rural areas around Dawson Creek, Pouce Coupe, Rolla, Arras, Kelly Lake
Dease Lake	1,413	6	804	51	215	Lower Post, Telegraph Creek, Jade City
Duncan	13,699	21	652	145	223	
Elk Valley	15,099	18	839	76	91	Fernie, Sparwood, Elkford, Roosville
Enderby	7,454	7	1,065	124	116	
Falkland	3,459	3	1,153	41	35	
Fort Nelson	6,632	14	474	86	182	Prophet River, Toad River, Liard River
Fort St. James	4,989	13	384	112	292	
Fort St. John^{[Α]}	14,163	10	1,416	86	61	Rural areas around Fort St. John, Taylor, Wonowon, Pink Mountain
Fraser Lake	3,699	5	740	58	78	Fort Fraser
Gabriola Island	4,035	3	1,345	25	19	
Golden	7,914	10	791	74	94	Field, Donald
Granisle	543	3	181	44	241	
Hope^{[Α]}	1,433	5	287	44	152	Rural areas around Hope, Yale
Houston	4,832	6	805	84	104	
Hudson's Hope	1,653	3	551	34	62	
Kaslo	2,242	3	747	93	125	
Kelowna^{[Α]}	47,294	32	1,478	130	88	Rural areas around Kelowna, Peachland, Westbank
Kimberley^{[Α]}	2,651	2	1,326	57	43	Rural areas around Kimberley, Skookumchuck
Kitasoo-Xaixais	319	2	160	46	285	First Nations Administered Police Services, Klemtu
Kitimat^{[Α]}	562	2	281	37	132	Rural areas around Kitimat, Kemano
Ladysmith^{[Α]}	6,101	5	1,220	78	64	Rural areas around Ladysmith
Lake Cowichan	6,460	9	718	107	150	Youbou
Lillooet	3,770	7	539	67	124	Shalalth
Lisims-Nass Valley	1,874	4	469	136	290	New Aiyansh, Laxgalts'ap
Logan Lake	2,875	3	958	89	93	
Lumby	5,291	5	1,058	95	90	
Lytton	2,279	4	570	64	113	Spences Bridge
Mackenzie^{[Α]}	240	2	120	47	388	Rural areas around Mackenzie, McLeod Lake
Masset	2,427	7	347	86	248	Port Clements, Juskatla
McBride	2,257	3	752	66	88	Dunster
Merritt^{[Α]}	3,901	4	975	89	91	Rural areas around Merritt
Mission^{[Α]}	5,052	5	1,010	127	125	Rural areas around Mission, Deroche
Nakusp	3,956	4	989	64	65	
Nanaimo^{[Α]}	14,223	6	2,371	164	69	Rural areas around Nanaimo, Cedar, Lantzville, Nanoose Bay
Nelson^{[Α]}	11,314	8	1,414	61	43	Rural areas around Nelson, Winlaw
New Denver/Slocan Lake	3,248	3	1,083	46	42	
New Hazelton	6,475	10	648	111	172	Hazelton, Kispiox
Nootka Sound	2,380	5	476	58	121	Tahsis, Gold River
Oceanside	22,808	12	1,901	151	74	Parksville, Errington
One Hundred Mile House	13,945	13	1,073	82	76	108 Mile Ranch
Outer Gulf Islands	4,669	4	1,167	58	49	Pender Island, Galiano Island, Gabriola Island, Saturna Island, Mayne Island
Pemberton	4,240	7	606	41	67	Mount Currie
Penticton^{[Α]}	11,892	6	1,982	134	67	Rural areas around Penticton, Naramata, Kaleden
Port Alberni^{[Α]}	8,609	7	1,230	76	62	Rural areas around Port Alberni, Bamfield
Port Alice	1,172	2	586	43	73	Quatsino
Port Hardy	6,066	12	506	117	231	Holberg, Coal Harbour, Winter Harbour
Port McNeill	5,188	8	649	74	114	Zeballos, Woss, Telegraph Cove
Powell River	5,690	6	948	79	83	Lund
Prince George^{[Α]}	14,544	7	2,078	85	41	Rural areas around Prince George, Bear Lake
Prince Rupert^{[Α]}	2,222	4	556	72	130	Rural areas around Prince Rupert, Port Edward, Port Essington, Hartley Bay
Princeton	5,278	7	754	93	123	Hedley, Coalmont
Quadra Island	3,845	4	961	72	75	Stuart Island
Queen Charlotte City	2,841	5	568	78	137	Sandspit
Quesnel^{[Α]}	15,096	9	1,677	96	57	Rural areas around Quesnel
Revelstoke^{[Α]}	752	2	376	48	128	Rural areas around Revelstoke, Mica Creek
Salmo	2,573	4	643	75	116	
Salmon Arm^{[Α]}	7,967	5	1,593	96	60	Rural areas around Salmon Arm
Saltspring Island	10,322	7	1,475	92	62	Ganges
Sayward	912	3	304	35	116	
Shawnigan Lake	16,725	11	1,520	75	49	Malahat, Cobble Hill
Sicamous	4,662	6	777	112	144	
Sidney^{[Α]}	3,141	3	1,047	79	76	Rural areas around Sidney and North Saanich
Smithers^{[Α]}	8,466	6	1,411	91	83	Rural areas around Smithers, Telkwa, Moricetown, Fort Babine
Sooke^{[Α]}	4,365	4	1,091	91	83	Rural areas around Sooke, Port Renfrew, River Jordan
South Okanagan	21,607	21	1,029	118	114	Osoyoos, Oliver, Keremeos, Cawston
Squamish^{[Α]}	2,132	5	426	39	92	Rural areas around Squamish, Lions Bay, Britannia Beach, Brackendale
Stl'atl'imx	2,835	10	284	62	174	First Nations Administered Police Services
Stewart	783	3	261	18	68	
Sunshine Coast	19,689	20	984	81	82	Gibsons
Surrey^{[Α]}	715	1	715	74	103	Rural areas around Surrey, Barnston Island
T’Kumlups	7,012	8	877	89	102	First Nations Detachment (Kamloops)
Takla Landing	210	1	210	109	519	Takla Lake First Nation
Terrace^{[Α]}	8,506	7	1,215	102	84	Rural areas around Terrace
Texada Island	1,213	1	1,213	54	45	
Tofino	2,892	6	482	107	221	Clayoquot, Ahousaht
Trail^{[Α]}	11,561	10	1,156	55	47	Rural areas around Trail, Fruitvale, Rossland, Montrose
Tsay Keh Dene	464	2	232	119	513	Fort Ware
Tumbler Ridge	2,526	5	505	69	137	
Ucluelet	2,503	4	626	86	138	
UBC and University Endowment Lands	8,574	17	504	81	160	
Valemount	1,958	4	490	52	106	Tête Jaune Cache
Vanderhoof	8,955	9	995	91	92	
Vernon^{[Α]}	11,678	8	1,460	95	65	Rural areas around Vernon
Wells	444	3	148	11	77	
West Shore	9,746	5	1,949	117	60	Metchosin, Highlands
Whistler^{[Α]}	315	2	158	14	86	Rural areas around Whistler
Williams Lake^{[Α]}	15,206	10	1,521	40	40	Rural areas around Williams Lake, Horsefly, Likely
Average			953	91	95	Excluding First Nations Administered Police Services

== Notes ==
^{Α} This RCMP detachment operated from the municipality but provided police services to the rural areas and other communities, not the municipality it operated from. A separate municipal RCMP detachment covered the municipality and its statistics were kept separate (shown above).
