= List of law enforcement agencies in British Columbia =

The following is a list of law enforcement agencies operating in the province of British Columbia, Canada.

== Federal agencies ==
- RCMP "E" Division – The Royal Canadian Mounted Police is the largest police body operating in British Columbia, providing federal, provincial, and municipal policing throughout the province. "E" Division has a strength of 5,900 sworn members and employs 1,700 civilian members and public service employees. In addition, approximately 1,200 auxiliary constables volunteer with "E" Division. It is the largest RCMP division, and along with "M" Division in the Yukon, makes up the Pacific Region, one of the four geographical regions of Canada under the RCMP's policing scheme. "E" Division operates out of 127 local detachments. In 2013, the headquarters was moved from Vancouver to the purpose-built Green Timbers Urban Forest Park complex in Surrey, which allowed the amalgamation of numerous individual buildings around the Lower Mainland area. It provides policing services in all communities except those serviced by 12 municipal police departments. Its commanding officer is Deputy Commissioner Craig Callens.
- Canada Border Services Agency - The CBSA employs both Border Services Officers and Immigration Enforcement Officers. Both have powers and duties of a peace officer while on duty. They are designated peace officers, and primarily enforce customs and immigration-related legislation, in particular the Customs Act and the Immigration and Refugee Protection Act as well as over 90 other Acts of Parliament. Because of their peace officer designation, they also have the power to enforce other Acts of Parliament, including the Criminal Code of Canada. Border Services Officers are equipped with handcuffs, oleoresin capsicum (OC) spray, batons, and are currently armed with Beretta PX4 Storm pistols.
- Canadian Pacific Police Service - The Canadian Pacific Police Service, commonly known as CP Rail Police or simply CPR Police, is a private police force enforcing safety and policing along Canadian Pacific properties and rail lines in Canada and the United States, including limited sections of the Milton line of GO Transit in the Greater Toronto Area. Formerly CP Railway Police, they have a long and storied past within Canada and CP Rail is a part of Canada's history. They are duly appointed and armed federal police officers that gather their authority in Canada via the Railway Safety Act as well as other acts.
- Canadian National Police Service - The Canadian National Police Service (commonly referred to as the CN Police or CNR Police) is a private police force protecting the property, personnel, and rail infrastructure of Canadian National Railway in Canada and the United States. Established in 1923 upon the amalgamation of several railway companies the Government of Canada established the Canadian National Railway Police. Currently CN Police Officers operate across Canada and the United States. In Canada, the BC Rail Police amalgamated into the CN Police Service in 2005. In the United States three railway police services, Illinois Central Railroad Police, Grand Trunk Railway Police and Wisconsin Central Transportation Police also amalgamated into the CN Police Service.
- Fishery Officers - the Department of Fisheries and Oceans Canada employs Fishery Officers whom are designated under section 5(1) of the Fisheries Act and as peace officers are sworn to educate and enforce all provisions of the Act and other related acts and regulations. They carry firearms and other weapons such as pepper spray while conducting patrols and other enforcement initiatives.
- Park Wardens - Parks Canada employs Park Wardens to protect natural and cultural resources, conduct campground patrols and other targeted enforcement activities, and to ensure the safety of visitors in national parks and marine conservation areas. They are designated under section 18 of the Canada National Parks Act and have the authority of peace officers. They carry firearms and have access to other use of force options.
- Correctional Service of Canada (CSC; French: Service correctionnel du Canada), also known as Correctional Service Canada or Corrections Canada, is the Canadian federal government agency responsible for the incarceration and rehabilitation of convicted criminal offenders sentenced to two years or more.[3] The agency has its headquarters in Ottawa, Ontario.[4]

Employees working at federal penitentiaries are designated as federal Peace Officers under Section 10 of the Corrections and Conditional Release Act[1]. The CSC officially came into being on April 10, 1979, when Queen Elizabeth II signed authorization for the newly commissioned agency and presented it with its armorial bearings.

- Environment Canada Officers - Officers appointed pursuant to section 217(3) of the Canadian Environmental Protection Act, enforcement officers have all the powers of peace officers. There are two designations of enforcement officers: Environmental Enforcement and Wildlife Enforcement. The former administers the Canadian Environmental Protection Act and pollution provisions of the Fisheries Act and corresponding regulations. The latter enforces Migratory Birds Convention Act, Canada Wildlife Act, Species at Risk Act and The Wild Animal and Plant Protection and Regulation of International and Interprovincial Trade Act. All officers wear dark green uniform with black ties and a badge (appear on the right). Environmental Enforcement Officers only carry baton and OC spray whereas Wildlife Enforcement Officers are also equipped with firearm.
- Canadian Forces Military Police - The Canadian Forces Military Police have four units in British Columbia, MPU Esquimalt under the Naval MP Group, ASU Chilliwack MP Det under 1MP Regiment, 12MP Platoon (reserve) also under 1MP Regiment, and 12MP Flight (Out of CFB Comox) under 1MP Squadron. In addition to peace officer powers granted under the Criminal Code of Canada, MPs also have the power under s.156 of the National Defence Act to enforce the Code of Service Discipline (National Defence Act), Queen's Regulations and Orders, Defence Administrative Orders and Directives, Canadian Forces Administrative Orders, as well as international treaties such as the Geneva Conventions and the Hague Conventions of 1899 and 1907. The Military Police have jurisdiction over all members subject to the Code of Service Discipline regardless of the location of the offence, and over all persons on defence property. Furthermore, Military Police jurisdiction extends to military property as well (e.g., any persons found committing offences against military property, whether domestically or internationally would fall under the jurisdiction of the Military Police). Military Police members are issued handcuffs, oleoresin capsicum (OC) spray, batons, SIG Sauer P225 sidearms and Colt Canada C8 Carbines.

== Provincial agencies ==
- Organized Crime Agency of British Columbia (OCABC) Established as an independent law enforcement agency in 1999, the mandate of the OCABC is to "facilitate the disruption and suppression of organized crime".
- Combined Forces Special Enforcement Unit - British Columbia (CFSEU-BC) In 2004, CFSEU-BC was developed in consultation with the Provincial Government. The intent was to integrate the Organized Crime Agency of British Columbia (OCABC), municipal police and the RCMP into one combined unit to coordinate the province's response to the growing threat of organized crime and gang violence. In 2009, under the direction of the provincial and federal governments, CFSEU-BC expanded to include the Integrated Gang Task Force (Uniform Division, Firearms Enforcement Team, Investigative Team) restructuring of the Outlaw Motorcycle Gang Enforcement and Intelligence Unit, and the establishment of branch offices in Prince George covering northern B.C., and in Kelowna covering southeast B.C.
- South Coast British Columbia Transportation Authority Police Service (Metro Vancouver Transit Police) – Created in 2005, they are the only transit police agency in Canada as the TransLink public transit system covers 21 municipalities with 16 different police departments/RCMP detachments. Most other large Canadian cities use a combination of special constables and a transit division of their local police. Transit Police officers have the same authorities and powers as other police officers while on and off duty. They are sworn in as designated provincial constables, with full police powers throughout the province.
- British Columbia Conservation Officer Service (BCCOS) - As part of the Compliance Division of the British Columbia Ministry of the Environment, the Conservation Officer Service is responsible for enforcing over 20 federal and provincial environmental statutes and for responding to wildlife/human conflicts where public safety is at risk. Its headquarters are in Victoria and it has 44 offices throughout the province. It consists of Commercial Environmental Investigations Unit, the Special Investigations Unit, and the Ceremonial Unit. The COS has a strength of 120 regional conservation officers, excluding headquarter staff.
- British Columbia Natural Resource Officer - British Columbia has numerous laws to protect its land, water, forests and cultural resources. Over 150 Natural Resource Officers (NROs) work throughout British Columbia to ensure compliance with legislation and take enforcement actions as necessary. British Columbia has had a long history of natural resource compliance and enforcement even before the British Columbia Forest Service was introduced in 1912. Before the Forest Service was created in 1912 under the new Forest Act of that same year, there was legislation introduced in 1874 called the Bush Fire Act. Five Fire Wardens were appointed as Constables under the Bush Fire Act in 1905. The British Columbia Forest Service also employed Constables (Forest Rangers from 1912 to 1979), Forest Officers (1979 to 1994) and Compliance and Enforcement Officers (Forest Officer/Forest Official) (1994 to 2011) until the Natural Resource Officers were formed in 2011 under the Natural Resource Compliance Act.
- British Columbia Sheriff Service (BCSS) - Tracing its roots to the first sheriff appointed by Governor James Douglas for the Colony of Vancouver Island, the modern BCSS was formed after a consolidation of county sheriffs by the NDP government in 1974, and placed under the Ministry of the Attorney General. BCSS responsibilities include transporting prisoners by ground and air, protection of all Supreme, Appeals, Provincial Courts in B.C., assembling and supervising protecting juries, serving court documents, executing warrants, planning and undertaking High Security Operations for large scale trials such as Air India, protecting Federal and Provincial Judiciary, Providing plainclothes protection details to those Govt. Officials under threat, protection of Crown Prosecutors and assisting the Provincial Coroners Office, carrying out court orders. Undertaking Threat assessments and Intelligence briefings, Returning accused persons wanted on outstanding warrants as part of the BC Fugituve Return Program, working in integrated Law Enforcement Units such as R.T.I.C. (Real Time Intelligence Centre) Basic training is undertaken at the Sheriffs Academy at Justice Institute of British Columbia.

CVSE Shoulder Flash

- British Columbia Court Bailiff (BCCC) - British Columbia Court Bailiffs are legally authorized to enforce court orders from civil proceedings. These civil execution services include executing several types of court orders and extra-judicial processes. The execution of court orders issued in a civil proceeding can only be performed by Court Bailiffs under contract with the Ministry of Attorney General. The Province contracts to Court Bailiff firms to provide civil execution services in BC. These firms hire individuals who are trained and appointed to become Court Bailiffs. Only individuals appointed by the Attorney General under section 3(1) of the B.C. Sheriff Act are authorized to perform civil execution services as a Court Bailiff in BC, and Court Bailiffs are deemed to be Sheriffs under the Act.
- Passenger Transportation Enforcement Officers (PTEOs) - Passenger Transportation Enforcement Officers (PTEOs) are B.C. Peace Officers who work for the Passenger Transportation Branch. PTEOs specialize in ensuring the commercial passenger transportation industry is in compliance with the Passenger Transportation Act and Regulation. PTEOs perform the following activities; conduct roadside enforcement, inspections, and audits, investigate complaints against licensed and unlicensed operators, issue notice and order forms, violation tickets, administrative penalties, and cease and desist letters, and ensure licensed operators are in compliance with their Terms and Conditions of Licence
- British Columbia Commercial Vehicle Safety and Enforcement (BCCVSE) - CVSE began in 1958 as the B.C. Department of Commercial Transport and became responsible for 15 fixed scale facilities and six portable patrol vehicles throughout the Province of BC to protect the highway infrastructure from overloaded vehicles. In the late 1980s the "Weighmasters" began getting under trucks for closer inspections and became known as the "Commercial Vehicle Inspectors" with a broader focus on public safety ensuring that commercial vehicles were in good condition, cargo was safely loaded and drivers were qualified and competent. Today CVSE is responsible for the inspection and enforcement of the National Safety Code and Vehicle Inspection Standards of hundreds of thousands of commercial vehicles. In 2005 CVSE Peace Officers began to conduct speed enforcement for heavy trucks to enhance safety on B.C.’s highway system. As a founding member of the Commercial Vehicle Safety Alliance, it represents BC in the tri-national (Canada, Mexico and the United States) conferences. In addition, transport of Dangerous Goods falls under the jurisdiction of CVSE. There are over 230 CVSE officers that are appointed as peace officers under the Motor Vehicle Act Inspectors Authorization Regulation and can issue violation tickets to all motor vehicles on the roads of British Columbia.
- Legislative Assembly Protective Services - Reporting to the Sergeant-at-Arms of the Legislative Assembly of British Columbia, the Special Provincial Constables are responsible for the access control and security of the legislative precinct and the protection of Members and assets of the Legislative Assembly, including the security of constituent offices.
- British Columbia Community Safety Unit (CSU) - Established October 17, 2018 as a new enforcement unit in the BC Government. CSU Officers are dually appointed as inspectors under the Cannabis Control and Licensing Act and as Special Provincial Constables.
- Special Provincial Constable (SPC) - Approximately 25 Provincial Agencies and Crown Corporations employ Special Provincial Constables whose duties vary from Criminal Investigations (Fraud, Forgery, False Pretences, Identity Theft/Fraud) to Regulatory Investigations, Intelligence Gathering and Protective Services. Typical roles are Criminal Fraud Investigators (Benefits/Claims Fraud and Identity Fraud for ICBC, WorkSafeBC, Income Assistance, Childcare and Healthcare); Compliance and Enforcement Investigations regarding, Consumer Protection, Film Classification, Financial Institutions, Securities/Markets, Gaming Enforcement, Liquor, Cannabis, Tobacco Tax, General Revenue, Conservation Officer Service, Natural Resource Operations, Intersection Safety Cameras, Security Programs and SPCA; Protection and Risk Services for the Legislature, Government, Courts and Forensic Psychiatric Hospital. The following Memorandum of Understanding with the Independent Investigations Office list all the SPC Agencies in British Columbia.
- Independent Investigations Office - The IIO is to conduct investigations into incidents where a police officer (regular, or special constable, on or off-duty) may have caused death or serious harm and determine whether or not an officer may have committed an offence. They are a designated police force under the BC Police Act.
- Forensic Services Officer - Provide safe and secure escort to all maximum security/high risk persons in custody at the Forensic Psychiatric Hospital including remands, temporary absences from other correctional institutions, immigration holds under the Criminal Code of Canada, and persons unfit to stand trial and found not criminally responsible due to a mental disorder (NCRMD) under the Mental Health Act.

== Municipal police ==
- Abbotsford Police Department
- Central Saanich Police Service
- Delta Police Department
- Nelson Police Department
- New Westminster Police Department
- Oak Bay Police Department
- Port Moody Police Department
- Saanich Police Department
- Surrey Police Service
- Vancouver Police Department
- Victoria Police Department
- West Vancouver Police Department

=== Bylaw Officers ===
Most, if not all, major municipalities in British Columbia employ bylaw officers for the enforcement of civic laws. These officers are peace officers when on duty, and have the appropriate obligations and powers of arrest.

== Aboriginal police ==
- Stl’atl’imx Tribal Police Service (STPS) - The STPS was created in 1992. It operated as a pilot project for the next several years, with its officers sworn in as special constables. In 1999, it became a fully empowered police agency responsible for ten participating Stl'atl'imx communities. It operates out of the Lillooet Detachment and the Mount Currie Detachment.

== Historical agencies ==
Most of these early municipal/city police departments listed below would have had anywhere from one to five constables employed depending on the size of the town's population, crime levels and civil disorder. When created, these small police forces would have taken over or complemented the already existing British Columbia Provincial Police stationed in the area. They were cities, towns and districts that would have expanded rapidly in the late 1800s early 1900s due to being ports, forestry, farming or mining centres and needed to create their own police forces to deal with crime, fines, taxes and fees within the city or town limits since the British Columbia Provincial Police would not do this for them. Some of these municipal constable appointments may have been full time or as needed on call basis. Typically each historical municipal police department would have had at a minimum a full time chief constable.

- Kitasoo Xaixais Tribal Police Service - First Nations police service based in Klemtu, BC. This police department was opened in 1999 with a transition year to be fully functioning at the beginning of 2000. The police department was closed on April 1, 2008, with the RCMP taking over policing duties.
- BC Transit Police - When SkyTrain began operating in December 1985, fifteen Special Provincial Constables were appointed to BC Transit's Vancouver Regional Transit System. The Special Constables did not carry firearms but had powers of arrest and were able to serve violation tickets. On January 1, 1990, the BC Transit Police was formed with a chief constable and 24 special constables. In 2005 the BC Transit Police became the South Coast British Columbia Transportation Authority Police Service https://transitpolice.ca/about-us/history/
- BC Rail Police - Railway police for the provincial crown corporation of the British Columbia Railway - (1972 to 2004) and prior to that the Pacific Great Eastern Railway (1912 - 1971). BC Rail operations were sold to Canadian National in 2004. (See CN Police above)
- Ditidaht Police Service - First Nations police service based at Nitinat Lake, BC This police force was established in October 1996 with one chief constable and was closed in 2004 with the Lake Cowichan RCMP taking over policing duties.
- Esquimalt Police Department - Township of Esquimalt incorporated on September 1, 1912. Two police constables were appointed by October 19, 1912, and by November 5, 1912, one of the two constables was appointed chief constable. By 1922 the Esquimalt police consisted of a chief of police and two constables. In 1942 the police force had grown to four members and in 1949 to five members. On January 30, 1955, the 12-member police force was responsible for both policing and firefighting duties. By 1964 the police force consisted of 16 members, including the chief of police, two sergeants and a corporal. By 1967 the police force had grown to 23 members, 9 of which are trained as firefighters and by September 1967 would be a police force of 30 members. On January 14, 2003, the Esquimalt Police Department and its 46 officers (13 of which do double duty as firefighters) amalgamated with the Victoria Police Department, and today Victoria Police serves both communities. https://www.esquimalt.ca/public-safety/fire-department/history
- Tsewultun Police Service - First Nations police service based in Duncan, BC This police force was established in 1995 with four constables. The police force was closed in September 2000 with the Duncan RCMP taking over policing duties.
- Coordinated Law Enforcement Unit (CLEU) - CLEU was established in 1974 in response to the rapid rise in criminal activity in British Columbia in the late 1960s and early 1970s. CLEU remained until 1999 when it became the Organized Crime Agency of British Columbia. http://www.llbc.leg.bc.ca/public/pubdocs/bcdocs/192381/lawenforcementunit.pdf
- Ports Canada Police - The Ports Police were disbanded in 1998. Their employers were the Canada Ports Corporation, phased out in 1998 with the creation of the Canada Marine Act.
- Matsqui Police Department - The District of Matsqui was incorporated on November 26, 1892. Matsqui's first municipal constable was appointed on January 28, 1905. On June 12, 1924, Matsqui appointed its first temporary "traffic cop". The first Matsqui City Police Force existed until March 1925 when the British Columbia Police took over policing with 2 constables assigned to the district. Page B-14 of http://www.llbc.leg.bc.ca/public/pubdocs/bcdocs/183391/closingthegapvol1.pdf On August 9, 1954, the municipality determined to cancel its contract with the RCMP which had a four police officers located there. The Matsqui Police Department was then re-established on January 1, 1955, and in its first year had a chief of police and three constables for a population of 9000 to 10,000. By 1958 the police force had 10 officers. By 1970 it had 15 officers for a population of 25,000. By November 1976 the police force consisted of 35 officers and turned in their BC Provincial Police khaki uniforms for dark blue uniforms. By May 6, 1987, the force consisted of 66 officers. On January 1, 1995, the municipalities of Matsqui (police) and Abbotsford (RCMP) amalgamated to be called the City of Abbotsford and the name of the department changed to the Abbotsford Police Department.
- British Columbia Highways Patrol - The Department of Highways Traffic Patrol was formed in 1958 and consisted of three NCO's and 33 Patrolmen (with an additional 26 Patrolmen added in the summer months and assigned to the Ferry Terminals in BC). Highway Patrol was responsible for traffic control at five major ferry terminals in BC (Tswwassen, Swartz Bay, Horseshoe Bay, Departure Bay and Langdale), the First Narrows Bridge (Lion's Gate Bridge), Second Narrows Bridge, Oak Street Bridge, George Massey Tunnel and the Port Mann Bridge and all approaches to these facilities. Highway Patrolmen were also sworn in as reserve constables for the Vancouver City Police, West Vancouver Police and RCMP. Highway Patrolmen had to deal with stalled vehicles, traffic violations, collisions, impaired drivers, stolen vehicles, suicides and attempted suicides as well as drugs, firearms, assaults and escaped prisoners. The BC Highways Patrol officers were not armed, utilized white and orange patrol vehicles and motorcycles with Red (only) lights and were uniformed in the then defunct British Columbia Provincial Police uniforms. Prior to 1958, the British Columbia Toll Highways and Bridges Authority superseded the formation of the BC Highways Patrol and had a uniformed and mobile enforcement presence to deal with tolls, collisions and traffic control in the Lower Mainland of BC tolled facilities. The BC Highway Patrol existed until 1988 when its officers and equipment then merged with what is now known as British Columbia Commercial Vehicle Safety and Enforcement (BCCVSE) to complement as additional mobile or portable commercial vehicle inspection and enforcement peace officers.

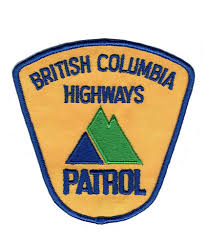

- Fraser Mills Police - The District of Fraser Mills was incorporated on March 25, 1913. The small community of 400 acres was created in 1889 when Frank Ross and James McLaren opened what would become Fraser Mills, a $350,000, then state-of-the-art lumber mill on the north bank of the Fraser River. By 1908, a mill town of 20 houses, a store, post office, hospital, office block, barber shop, and pool hall had grown around the mill. In April 1913 Fraser Mills appointed its first police constable. The population of Fraser Mills by January 1, 1917, was around 900. By 1948 the population was 450. The Fraser Mills police consisted of one full-time chief constable until the end of November 1969 when the town merged with the City of Coquitlam and the RCMP took over policing duties of the area.
- Tadanac Police - Tadanac Municipality was incorporated on December 21, 1922. By February 2, 1923, a chief of police and one constable was appointed for Tadanac to police the municipality and the Consolidated Mining and Smelting Company of Canada. Unfortunately there isn't a lot of information on the size of the police force, however in May 1943, the police chief stated that he was responsible for 200 police and guards protecting the "war plants" of the mining company. In 1951 the population of Tadanac was 481 and it appears that the police force consisted of a chief of police and deputy chief of police. By 1969 the Tadanac Police force still consisted of two members. Tadanac was amalgamated with the City of Trail on January 14, 1969, and policing would now fall under the RCMP. http://www.waymarking.com/waymarks/WMQZBN_Tadanac_Community_Trail_BC
- Mission City Police - The District of Mission was incorporated on June 2, 1892. The first constable was appointed in 1906 to police the district. This was BC Provincial Constable Arthur W. Lane, who was already policing in Mission for the Provincial Police and served from 1896 to 1910, when he died as a result of a heart attack while attempting to arrest an unruly Canadian Pacific train passenger. On March 19, 1908, the district appointed their own constable to police the district and no longer required the services of the BC Provincial Police who would still patrol the village and the unorganized territory. On February 9, 1911, the district had appointed two constables for policing duties. By 1947 a population of 4500 within Mission municipality was policed by one constable with assistance by the BC Provincial Police. On December 30, 1952, Mission council approved the hiring of a second constable, Mission police consisted of a chief constable and a constable. By February 15, 1957, the Mission Police had expanded to 3 members and then to 6 members by 1966. The Mission Police were disbanded on January 3, 1968, and the RCMP took over policing with a sergeant, corporal and 8 constables to police Mission municipality and district (the RCMP had taken over policing the rural district of Mission in August 1950 from the BC Provincial Police and by 1967 had a sergeant and four constables policing the rural district only.
- Cumberland City Police - The City of Cumberland was incorporated on January 1, 1898. By 1901 the city had appointed its first constable. In 1903 the city had a population of 3000 and by 1904 the city had two constables. In 1909 the city had a chief constable and one constable. By 1926 the city had a population of 3000 and a chief of police and one constable. By 1938 the city had a population of 2400 and had a chief of police and one constable. By 1940 the city police force consisted of a chief of police and two constables (an additional constable was likely added due to WW II air raid precautions). By 1944 the city police force consisted of a chief of police and one constable again and by 1948 it just consisted of a chief of police. On January 1, 1958 (likely due to a drop in the population) the City of Cumberland changed its status to village and with that the RCMP took over policing in the community. Three RCMP constables would provide policing to Cumberland, Courtenay and Union Bay.
- Surrey Police Department - The Municipality of Surrey was incorporated on November 10, 1879. The first constable appointed by the municipality occurred on March 18, 1887. On September 2, 1905, the police force was increased to two full-time constables due to an increase in the population. By 1909 the Surrey police force consisted of three members (a chief of police and two constables). By 1921 the Surrey police force gained an extra constable (1 stationed at White Rock, 1 stationed at Crescent Beach and the third with the chief at Cloverdale). By 1942 the Surrey police force still had four members (a chief of police and three constables) and by 1946 the police force would consist of a chief of police, deputy chief and five constables. In February 1950 the Surrey police force was authorized to hire three additional constables, bringing its total strength to eleven members (one chief, one deputy chief and nine constables). The council voted in 1950 to cease its municipal police and the RCMP took over policing in Surrey on May 1, 1951, with a city police force of 18 members for a population of 35,000. The municipal Surrey Police Service will once again take over Surrey RCMP after the city council approved a motion in 2018.
- British Columbia Provincial Police (BCPP) This was the provincial police force of BC from 1866 until 1950, when it was absorbed into the Royal Canadian Mounted Police. Its predecessors were the Vancouver Island Colonial Police and the BC Constabulary (Mainland) that existed from 1858 to 1866 when they merged to become the BCPP. Reference information to all municipal police forces that were taken over by the BCPP from 1925 to 1949 is located on Page B-12 of http://www.llbc.leg.bc.ca/public/pubdocs/bcdocs/192381/lawenforcementunit.pdf. Of note most of these municipal police departments would have had anywhere from 1 to 5 constables employed depending on the size of the town's population, crime levels and civil disorder. Some of these municipal constable appointments may have been full-time or as needed on call basis. Typically each historical municipal police department would have had a full-time chief constable.
- Trail City Police - The City of Trail was incorporated on June 1, 1901, and the first chief of police was appointed soon after. In 1907 the city had a chief of police and a night watchman (constable). By 1914 the population of the city was 2100 and the police force consisted of the chief of police and a constable. By June 1925 an additional constable was approved to be added to the police force. From 1930 to 1932 there were 5 members on the police force including the chief of police. this number reduced to 4 in 1933 and by 1938 was back to 5 police members for a population of over 3000. By 1943 there were 6 members of the Trail City police force. By January 1949 it was determined that if the British Columbia Provincial Police was brought in to police the city it would need to consist of a sergeant, corporal and 8 constables. By the end of January 1949 the British Columbia Provincial Police 10 member force took over policing duties from the 6 member Trail City police force. The RCMP would then be providing policing in the City of Trail by August 1950.
- Merritt City Police - The City of Merritt was incorporated on April 1, 1911. On May 12, 1911 the city appointed its first chief of police and one constable. On September 30, 1921 the city police was reduced to just the chief of police (the city also had a British Columbia Provincial Police constable and a Dominion Indian Police constable to provide policing assistance in the city as necessary). On February 21, 1948 the British Columbia Provincial Police took over policing duties of the City of Merritt. The Provincial Police already had a constable stationed in Merritt to police the district and added a second constable to police the city and district.
- BC Electric Railway Police - 1890 - Origins - Watchmen. The British Columbia Electric Railway, which had previously been three separate streetcar companies in Victoria, Vancouver, and New Westminster, employed watchmen to protect their first depots and power plants. These watchmen would later transition to become BC Electric security. 1900s - Railway Constables. The B.C.E.R. employed special constables appointed under the BC Railway Act. These constables were employed as watchmen, for special projects & special events, or in the case of the Great War – to protect against enemy sabotage. By 1915, as part of wartime measures, 31 special constables were assigned to key infrastructure points along transmission lines and key facilities across Vancouver, Indian Arm, and Burrard Inlet. It was on March 19, 1915, that Special Constable Charles Painter was shot and killed on duty while attempting to arrest a thief along the rail tracks adjacent to False Creek. 1940 - Special Protection Force. After the Great War, the use of constables by B.C.E.R. dwindled before returning on June 18, 1940, with the creation of the Special Protection Force – an armed special constable team established to protect against enemy sabotage. Most of their members were ex-military and were appointed as special provincial or municipal constables, depending on their location. They were posted to transmission lines, power plants and substations, and transportation hubs, similar to the special constables of the Great War. After the 1945 victory in Japan, the force was disbanded, and the B.C.E.R. returned to having watchmen as their sole protective staff. https://transitpolice.ca/about-us/history/
- Langley Municipal Police - Langley Township was incorporated on April 26, 1873, and would have been policed by the BC Provincial Police until January 22, 1906, when the town council first met and decided to appoint two municipal constables. On February 17, 1906, two municipal constables were appointed. By February 3, 1911, the town had employed 3 constables. In 1912 the town also had a chief constable appointed. In 1914 deputy constables were appointed for policing Aldergrove and Fort Langley. On February 13, 1915, the Langley police consisted of a chief constable and 2 constables with 1 assistant constable for Aldergrove and 1 for Fort Langley. February 12, 1923, police chief (Bob Macklin) is appointed and is the first full-time police officer in Langley. Macklin served 19 years as Langley chief of police. By 1933 the Langley police consisted of the police chief and one constable and by June 2, 1934, a motorcycle officer was added for traffic duties. The BC Provincial Police took over policing of Langley on December 10, 1942, with 2 constables stationed there.
- Richmond/Steveston City Police - Richmond was incorporated as a municipality on November 10, 1879. In 1890 the Richmond council appointed its first police constable and by 1895 there were four constables appointed for Richmond/Steveston. In 1899 the Richmond/Steveston police consisted of a chief of police and two constables. In April 1900 the chief of police, Alex Main was murdered on duty. By 1915 the police force consisted of a chief of police and one constable in Steveston and one constable to patrol the Number 5 and River Road district and by 1918 the police force consisted of the chief of police and one constable. On October 1, 1928, the police force added an extra constable and now consisted of a chief of police and two constables once again. On January 4, 1940, a third constable was added to the police force and now consisted of a chief of police and three constables. Due to World War II and the associated risks of the airport being located in Richmond as well as communication stations policing duties were taken over by the British Columbia Provincial Police on January 1, 1941, with a sergeant and three constables.
- Dominion Indian Police - This Dominion (Federal) Police force was likely established in British Columbia around 1883. In 1892 there were probably five or six full-time constables appointed for all of British Columbia. The RCMP likely took over policing duties around the late 1930s.
- Greenwood City Police - The City of Greenwood was incorporated July 12, 1897. Greenwood had a BC Provincial Police constable until Jan 29, 1898, at which time they appointed a city constable. In 1898 a police chief was also appointed. The population of Greenwood by 1903 was 1359 and the city had a police chief and constable. The copper smelter in Greenwood was closed in 1919. By 1928 the population was 500 and the city police consisted of just the police chief. The population declined again to 171 by 1932 with only a police chief employed. The last police chief was appointed November 10, 1939. By January 11, 1940, Greenwood only had Police Commissioners until 1954 and it is unclear if there was a police chief during that time. There likely was not a police chief due to the small population of Greenwood and that the town was used as a Japanese internment camp from 1942 to 1949. The BC Provincial Police and the RCMP would have had the primary policing duties in the city during the time of internment. Then in 1949 the Japanese were allowed to return home to the coast of BC. Policing in Greenwood from 1949 to 1950 would have been provided by the BC Provincial Police from Grand Forks and Midway and subsequently the RCMP from Grand Forks and Midway from August 1950 to present day.
- Kamloops City Police - The City of Kamloops was incorporated on July 1, 1893. On July 3, 1893 the city appointed its first chief of police and one constable. A second constable was appointed on July 15, 1893. By April 1911 the city police force consisted of a chief of police, a sergeant and two constables. An additional constable was added in 1912. By 1922 the city police force still had a chief of police, a sergeant and three constables and in 1930 a fourth constable was added to the police department. The British Columbia Provincial Police took over policing duties of the city on July 1, 1938. At the time Kamloops City Police, had six members (a chief of police, a sergeant and four constables) Policing was taken over by the British Columbia Provincial Police in 1938 (likely with a sergeant, corporal and four constables.)
- Kaslo Police - Incorporated as a city on August 14, 1893. By October 18, 1893, the city had a chief constable and one constable. On January 19, 1895, the city decreed that it would be policed by three special constables during the day. In 1905 the city had a population of 1500 and was policed by the chief of police. By 1929 the city had a population of 900 and was policed by the chief of police. By 1932 the city population had reduced to 523. BC Provincial Police took over policing of the city in April 1937 with a provincial constable who was already stationed in Kaslo.
- Vernon City Police - The City of Vernon was incorporated on December 30, 1892. On February 18, 1893, the city appointed their first constable and on April 6, 1893, the city appointed a second constable. By 1900 the population of Vernon was 900 which increased to 1500 by 1905. By April 6, 1905, the city had a chief of police and one constable. By 1913 the city police force consisted of a chief of police and three constables and by 1915 this had reduced to the chief and one constable. By 1934 the city police force consisted of four members once again (chief of police, a sergeant and two constables). The British Columbia Provincial Police took over policing of Vernon on June 1, 1936, with a sergeant, a corporal and two constables. Vernon police chief Robert Clerke had served as the chief of police for 25 years (from 1911 to 1936).
- Maple Ridge Municipal Police (Port Hammond and Port Haney) - The District of Maple Ridge was incorporated on September 12, 1874. In 1884/1885 the district had a peace officer. On March 8, 1906, a constable was appointed to the district. In 1911 one constable was appointed for Whonnock and another constable appointed for Ruskin. On January 6, 1921, Chief Constable Pope retired after 24 years of policing the district. The district retained its own police until March 1936 when the current chief constable was suspended from duties during which time the BC Provincial Police were requested to temporarily provide policing services. On April 5, 1936, the policing duties within the district were handed over to the British Columbia Provincial Police. It is unclear how many provincial constables were stationed in Maple Ridge, but it is likely one as there was only one full-time (chief) constable in 1936.
- Salmon Arm City Police - The City of Salmon Arm was incorporated on March 12, 1912. The city appointed its first constable on April 18, 1912 by having the same constable as the District of Salmon Arm for city policing duties (the constable would be located in the city). By 1920 the population of the city was 600 (which increased to 800 by 1925). In 1921 the title of Constable was changed to Chief of Police for the city. On May 30, 1929 the District of Salmon Arm decided to appoint its own constable (separate from the city). By March 1, 1935 the policing of the municipality and city of Salmon Arm were taken over by the British Columbia Provincial Police with two constables stationed there. On September 1, 1970 the Salmon Arm District and City merged to become the District of Salmon Arm municipality.
- Salmon Arm District Police - The District of Salmon Arm was incorporated as a municipality on May 15, 1905. The municipality appointed its first constable on November 27, 1908. On March 12, 1912 the City of Salmon Arm was incorporated and separated from the District of Salmon Arm. The constable for the municipality would also provide policing for the city, but be located in the city of Salmon Arm. By 1920 the population of the municipality was 3000 which increased to 4500 by 1925. On May 30, 1929 the municipality decided to appoint its own constable (separate from the city). By March 1, 1935 the policing of the municipality and city of Salmon Arm were taken over by the British Columbia Provincial Police with two constables stationed there. On September 1, 1970 the Salmon Arm District and City merged to become the District of Salmon Arm municipality.
- Burnaby City Police - The City of Burnaby was incorporated as a municipality on September 22, 1892, with a population of 300. On November 7, 1896, Burnaby appointed its first Special Constable to enforce the "Wide Tire By-Law". The first police constable appointed in the city was A.D. Cook, on June 2, 1900. By August 1907 a second constable (on call) was appointed to the City of Burnaby and by 1910 the city had three (on call) constables which included a full-time chief of police. In March 1911 the Burnaby police consisted of four full-time constables (of which two were mounted police) and a police chief. In February 1913 with a population of 15,000 the Burnaby City police department was increased to 12 members, consisting of a chief of police, sergeant, 8 mounted constables and 2 regular constables. by 1915 the police horses were replaced by cars and motorcycles. By February 1920 the Burnaby City police force consisted of a chief constable, sergeant and 8 constables. By 1926 the police force consisted of 12 members in total again. On March 1, 1935, the British Columbia Provincial Police took over the policing duties of the City of Burnaby 15 member police force (including the chief of police). A Provincial Police Inspector was put in charge of policing the city, likely made up of a sergeant, two corporals, and 10 or 11 constables for a population of around 30,000.
- Armstrong Police - The City of Armstrong was incorporated on March 31, 1913, with a population of 1200. On April 28, 1913, the city appointed its first chief constable who will provide policing for both Armstrong and Spallumcheen. By 1920 the city had a chief constable and one constable. The British Columbia Provincial Police took over policing of both Armstrong City and Spallumcheen Township (which surrounds the City of Armstrong) on January 1, 1935, with one constable posted for both areas in Armstrong.
- Spallumcheen Police - The Township of Spallumcheen was incorporated on July 21, 1892. On June 14, 1893, the town appointed its first constable. By April 1910 the town had appointed a chief of police. On April 28, 1913, the policing of both Armstrong City and Spallumcheen Township where shared by one chief constable. The British Columbia Provincial Police took over policing of both Armstrong City and Spallumcheen township (which surrounds the City of Armstrong) on January 1, 1935, with one constable posted for both areas in Armstrong.
- North Vancouver City Police - North Vancouver was incorporated on May 13, 1907, with a population of 1500 policed by the British Columbia Provincial Police. The first chief of police was appointed on May 21, 1907, and by June of that year a constable was hired to assist the chief. By 1911 the police force had expanded to seven including the chief of police and a sergeant for a population of 4500. By June 1915 the police force consisted of eleven members including the chief and a detective sergeant and sergeant, which was then reduced by fifty percent on November 1, 1915, due to the city's finances. The city police would consist of a chief, sergeant and four constables. By 1923 the police force consisted of nine members including the chief of police and a sergeant. By June 1925 the police force was again reduced to six members consisting of a chief of police, sergeant and four constables (3 motorcycles were purchased for patrolling, which negated the need to have three extra constables). By September 1928 the police force was increased to nine members consisting of the chief of police, deputy chief and seven constables. On February 16, 1932, the police forces of North Vancouver City and North Vancouver District merged to provide one police force (at the time of the merger, North Vancouver City had a chief constable and four constables and the North Vancouver District had a chief constable and two constables). The merged police force would now consist of two chiefs of police and six constables (officers were appointed as special constables to police each other's districts). On October 21, 1934, policing for the North Vancouver City and District were transferred over to the British Columbia Provincial Police with one sergeant, one corporal and five constables. http://bc.rcmp-grc.gc.ca/ViewPage.action?siteNodeId=155&languageId=4&contentId=2929
- North Vancouver District Police - The District of North Vancouver was incorporated on August 10, 1891. The first police constable was appointed on July 21, 1905, for the district. In the beginning of 1912 it was determined that the police force would consist of a chief constable and 2 constables. The District of West Vancouver is incorporated on March 15, 1912, which would then be policed by the newly formed West Vancouver Police and no longer require the services of the District of North Vancouver Police, which were previously providing policing to that western portion that was formerly part of North Vancouver District. By 1922 the District of North Vancouver Police force consisted of a chief of police and three constables. By 1928 the police force consisted of a chief of police, a sergeant and four constables. On February 16, 1932, the police forces of North Vancouver City and North Vancouver District merged to provide one police force (at the time of the merger, North Vancouver City had a chief constable and four constables and the North Vancouver District had a chief constable and two constables). The merged police force would now consist of two chiefs of police and six constables (officers were appointed as special constables to police each other's districts). On October 21, 1934, policing for the North Vancouver City and District were transferred over to the British Columbia Provincial Police with one sergeant, one corporal and five constables. http://bc.rcmp-grc.gc.ca/ViewPage.action?siteNodeId=155&languageId=4&contentId=2929. 4.
- Summerland Police - Summerland Municipality was incorporated on December 21, 1906. By 1909 the municipality had appointed its first constable (Summerland was already staffed with a BC Provincial Police Constable and a Game Warden in 1909). By May 10, 1912, the municipality had appointed a full-time chief of police. In 1930 Summerland had a population of 2000 and with policing provided by the chief of police. The British Columbia Provincial Police took over policing on October 1, 1934, likely with one constable assigned to the municipality.
- Port Alberni City Police - The City of Port Alberni was incorporated on March 7, 1912. On May 22, 1912 the city appointed its first constable (chief constable). By March 8, 1913 the city police consisted of a chief of police and one constable. In 1922 the population of the city was 1048. By 1928 the city population was 1150 and the police force consisted of a chief of police and one constable. The British Columbia Provincial Police took over policing of the city of Port Alberni on September 27, 1934. A BCPP sergeant already located in the City of Alberni would take over policing the City of Port Alberni, likely with one or two constables.
- Sumas Police - Sumas municipality incorporated on January 5, 1892. The first mention of a constable on the municipality records is March 20, 1908. By 1933 the municipality of Sumas had one constable and the BC Provincial Police took over policing of Sumas in April 1933.
- Peachland Police - Peachland Municipality was incorporated on January 1, 1909. On June 3, 1911, the municipality appointed its first constable. In 1927 the population of Peachland was 500 and the town had one municipal constable. The British Columbia Provincial Police took over policing of the municipality of Peachland on November 10, 1932, with a provincial constable already stationed in Summerland (20 km south of Peachland) to provide policing.
- Penticton Police - Penticton Municipality was incorporated on January 1, 1909. By February 1910 the municipality had appointed its first constable (by June 1910 the title would be chief constable) and had ordered 3 pairs of handcuffs, three badges, three batons and a revolver. The population of Penticton in 1910 was 1100). By March 25, 1911, the municipality had a full-time chief constable and had added one constable by June 10, 1911. On June 17, 1922, the police force consisted of a chief of police and two constables. The British Columbia Provincial Police took over policing of Penticton on October 1, 1932 with a sergeant, a corporal and three constables.
- Kelowna City Police - The City of Kelowna was incorporated on May 4, 1905. On July 27, 1905, the city appointed its first constable. By 1909 the city constable was appointed chief constable. By the summer of 1911 the city had a population of 2500 and the police force consisted of a chief of police and one constable. Around 1926 the police force now consisted of chief of police and two constables. A British Columbia commission report was completed in September 1929 regarding "complaints of laxity and incompetency" in the Kelowna City police department.http://www.llbc.leg.bc.ca/public/pubdocs/bcdocs_rc/353409/report_on_lindley_crease_kelowna_police_inquiry.pdf On January 19, 1932, the chief of police was charged with the murders of a woman and a former police constable in the city, both victims died of gunshot wounds that same day. http://davidmurdoch.blogspot.ca/2009/02/murders-that-rocked-kelowna.html By June 2, 1932, the policing of the city was turned over to the British Columbia Provincial Police with one corporal and two constables assigned there.
- Revelstoke Police - The City of Revelstoke was incorporated on March 1, 1899. On June 22, 1899, a chief of police was appointed along with two constables and by 1919 the city police consisted of the chief, a constable and a jailor. Revelstoke city police continued to be policed by a chief and constable until June 1, 1932, when the British Columbia Provincial Police took over policing, likely by a two-member team.
- Fernie Police - The City of Fernie was incorporated on July 28, 1904. On August 26, 1904, the first police chief and one constable were appointed for the city of Fernie for a population of 3500. By 1907 the city police consisted of a police chief and two constables. By 1922 the population in Fernie was 4750 and the city police force consisted of a police chief and two constables. The British Columbia Provincial Police took over policing of the city of Fernie on May 31, 1931, with a provincial police corporal and constable for a city population of 3000.
- Vancouver Harbour Police - On April 25, 1922, the Harbour Board took over policing on harbour property and in 1924 had a police force of 10 constables, two sergeants and a superintendent. By April 30, 1931, the Vancouver Harbour Police had disbanded
- Cranbrook Police - The City of Cranbrook was incorporated on November 1, 1905. In December 1905 a city police chief and a constable were appointed. By 1918 the city police consisted of a police chief and two constables. The British Columbia Provincial Police took over policing of the City of Cranbrook on March 1, 1931, with a sergeant and two constables.
- Alberni City Police (Port Alberni) - The City of Alberni was incorporated on January 1, 1913. On March 19, 1913 the city appointed its first chief of police. On August 22, 1922 the Chief Constable for the city was also the city Clerk. In 1924 the population of the city was 998 and it had a Chief Constable who was also the Clerk and Fire Chief. On April 23, 1930, after a shooting, the Alberni City Hall burned to the ground and the Chief Constable, Clerk and Fire Chief was found in the remains with a bullet wound to the head. Any potential suspect(s) in this case were not located and the Coroners Jury provided an open verdict on the matter. The British Columbia Provincial Police already had a sergeant posted in Alberni and by September 16, 1930 the provincial police took over all policing duties in the city with the addition of a constable for a population of 900.
- Enderby Police - The City of Enderby was incorporated on March 1, 1905, and consisted of 655 acres within the city district. A chief of police was also appointed in 1905 that was also already doing double duty as a British Columbia Provincial Constable and Game Warden for the area. On February 9, 1911, a full-time chief of police was appointed for Enderby. By 1920 the city had a population of 900 and a chief of police. By 1930 the city had population of 1500 with a chief of police. The British Columbia Provincial Police took over policing of Enderby on April 1, 1930, with one constable.
- Pitt Meadows Police - The District of Pitt Meadows was incorporated on April 1, 1914. On October 24, 1914, the position of constable was established and followed closely by another motion to procure a suitable badge for the Police Constable. In August 1929, the Pitt Meadows constable was replaced with a BC Provincial Police Constable, who would already be located in Haney (Maple Ridge). https://www.mapleridgenews.com/community/police-badge-a-gem-of-a-find/
- District of Glenmore Police - The District of Glenmore was incorporated on October 6, 1922, with a population of 270. On June 7, 1923, the district appointed its first constable. By March 26, 1925, the district combined the duties of Clerk, Collector, Treasurer, Assessor and Constable into one full-time position. The British Columbia Provincial Police took over policing of the district on July 9, 1929 and would provide a constable from Kelowna when policing was required.
- City of Chilliwack Police - City incorporated February 21, 1908, with a police chief and night watchman appointed on April 8, 1908. On January 27, 1909, the city had a chief of police and a constable. By October 26, 1910, the city police consisted of one chief and two constables. The British Columbia Provincial Police took over policing on the city and township of Chilliwack on April 4, 1929, to be policed by a sergeant and two constables.
- Township of Chilliwack Police - Township of Chilliwack incorporated on April 26, 1873. On January 22, 1896, a municipal constable was appointed for the township of Chilliwack. On February 21, 1908, the City of Chilliwack is incorporated and appoints its own police constable, separate and distinct from the Township of Chilliwack. By January 26, 1910, the Township of Chilliwack had two constables. The British Columbia Provincial Police took over policing on the city and township of Chilliwack on April 4, 1929, to be policed by a sergeant and two constables..
- Grand Forks City Police - The City of Grand Forks was Incorporated April 15, 1897. The first Constable was appointed on May 27, 1897. By 1900 there was a chief of police and in 1901 one constable was added, the population of Grand Forks was 2500. The British Columbia Provincial Police took over policing of Grand Forks in July 1928 with 2 members.
- Point Grey Police - The Municipality of Point Grey was incorporated on January 1, 1908. On March 3, 1908 the municipality appointed its first two police constables. By 1910 the police force had a chief of police and two constables. By the end of 1912 the police force had expanded to consist of a chief constable, sergeant and eight constables (2 additional constables would be added by the end of 1914. By February 15, 1917 the police force consisted of ten members in total including the chief of police. By February 1919 with a population of 15,000 the police force now consisted of a chief of police, a sergeant and seven constables (three more constables would be added to the police force by 1921). By January 1923 the police force consisted of the chief of police, two sergeants and 13 constables. In 1926 the Point Grey Police had 17 members (a chief of police, three sergeants 13 constables. On January 1, 1928 the Point Grey police merged with the Vancouver City Police force to become "B" division of that police force (on this date the Point Grey Police consisted of a chief of police, inspector, three sergeants, one detective, 13 constables and one jailer, for a total of 20 members.)
- South Vancouver Police - The Municipality of South Vancouver was incorporated on April 13, 1892. The first mention of police expenditures for the municipality was on January 15, 1895. by May 22, 1898 South Vancouver had two constables appointed. In 1901 the two constables from South Vancouver were appointed dually as constables for Burnaby and Richmond and in turn both Burnaby and Richmond had their constables appointed as constables to police South Vancouver on an as needed basis. In 1909 the population of South Vancouver was 5000 and it had two constables. By November 1, 1911 the South Vancouver Police had a chief of police and four constables. By 1912 the police force consisted of a chief of police, sergeant and nine constables, in addition the police force were equipped with automatic pistols to replace their revolvers. By 1916 there were 14 members in total on the South Vancouver Police force, their numbers were reduced to eight members on April 26, 1917 (the police force would now consist of a chief of police, a sergeant and six constables). By May 24, 1923 the South Vancouver Police Force adopted its first uniforms (blue), rather than operating in plain clothes since 1895 (On September 6, 1923, the police force now consisted of a chief of police, two sergeants and nine constables). In 1926 the population of the South Vancouver municipality was 40,000. On January 1, 1928 the South Vancouver police merged with the Vancouver City Police force to become "C" division of that police force (on this date the South Vancouver Police consisted of a chief of police, three sergeants, one detective and 12 constables for a total of 17 members.)
- Kent Police - District of Kent incorporated on January 1, 1895. There was one constable appointed in May or June 1895. It is unclear if there were any constables from 1896 to 1906. On October 31, 1907, the clerk and reeve were appointed to deal with all drunk and disorderly conduct. On February 2, 1908, a constable was appointed again. It is unclear if there were any constables appointed from 1910 to 1921, however Dominion of Canada constables were present for every Hop picking season which would bring in up to 750 workers. From 1918 to 1923 Kent has police commissioners that would act as police as needed. On February 3, 1923, a municipal constable was appointed once again. The British Columbia Provincial Police took over policing of Kent on June 16, 1927, with one constable (currently stationed at Harrison Lake BC Provincial Police District).
- Coldstream Police - The District of Coldstream was incorporated on December 21, 1906. On July 4, 1907, the district appointed its first police constable. In 1912 the population of Coldstream was around 500. On January 22, 1914, the duties of Clerk and Chief of Police were combined for the district. In June 1927 it was determined that the British Columbia Provincial Police would take over policing duties (likely with one provincial constable already located in the city of Vernon).
- Ladysmith Police - The City of Ladysmith was incorporated on June 3, 1904. In October 1904 the city appointed its first constable for a population of just over 3000. By 1909 the city had two constables and in 1910 the title constable was changed to chief constable. By 1913 the police force consisted of a chief of police and two constables, which was reduced by one constable in May 1916. By 1925 the population of Ladysmith was 2000 and had a chief of police and one constable. The British Columbia Provincial Police took over policing of the City of Ladysmith on May 1, 1927, with three constables stationed there.
- North Cowichan Police - The District of North Cowichan was incorporated on June 18, 1873. The first mention of law enforcement in Duncan (North Cowichan) in on Oct 18, 1891 when new cells were built in the courthouse. As well on October 25, 1891 there is a mention of a constable making an arrest at the train depot. February 2, 1893 is the first mention of appointing a constable for the District of North Cowichan. By January 20, 1912 the position of constable was now chief constable. When the City of Duncan was incorporated on March 4, 1912, it separated from the District of North Cowichan and with the city went the chief constable and his position. By September 12, 1912 the District of North Cowichan had once again appointed their own separate chief constable. By 1921 the district police consisted of a chief of police and a deputy constable (which became a full-time constable on March 6, 1924). By 1926 the district police consisted of a chief of police, one constable and one deputy constable. The British Columbia Provincial Police took over policing of the North Cowichan District in late September or October 1926 with one constable stationed at Chemanius with the remainder of the District being covered off by the BCPP already stationed at Duncan.
- Nanaimo City Police - The City of Nanaimo was incorporated on December 24, 1874. During the first few years of the city it appears that the city paid for part of a British Columbia Provincial Police constable's salary and that a constable appointed by the city didn't occur until 1876. By 1880 the city had a chief of police and one constable. By January 20, 1886 the city had a chief of police and two constables and by August 30, 1892 the police force consisted of a chief of police, sergeant and one constable (by January 25, 1894 the police force was reduced to a chief of police and one constable). By 1904 the city police force consisted of a chief of police and two constables again. By 1912 the city's population was around 8000. On February 4, 1913 and additional constable was added to police force. By 1915 the city police consisted of a chief of police, sergeant and three constables. The British Columbia Provincial Police took over policing of the City of Nanaimo on September 1, 1926, with a staff sergeant, a corporal and three constables (Nanaimo already had a Provincial Police force presence of a sergeant, corporal and three constables to police the Nanaimo District, so policing the city now would have greatly increased the BCPP numbers in the area.)
- Coquitlam Police - The District of Coquitlam was incorporated on July 25, 1891. Around July 1901 the municipality of Coquitlam appointed their first constable and a badge was ordered for the constable. By 1909 the municipality had two constables. In January 1911 the municipality had its first full-time constable appointed and by April 1912 there was a chief constable and constable appointed. By November 1912 the police force consisted of a chief and two constables. In March 1913 the City of Port Coquitlam and District of Fraser Mills were incorporated which reduced the District of Coquitlam police force to one member due to the reduction of the size of the district and population. By 1919 the District of Coquitlam police force consisted of a chief of police and one constable again. In August 1926 the BC Provincial Police took over policing for the District of Coquitlam and the Village of Maillardville.
- Prince Rupert Police - The City of Prince Rupert was incorporated on March 10, 1910, with a population of 5000. On June 2, 1910, the policing of the city was taken on by four appointed constables from the British Columbia Provincial Police who were policing the area already. A chief of police was appointed on June 6, 1910. The new city police force now consisted of a chief of police, sergeant and three constables. By 1916 the police force consisted of a chief of police and two constables. By 1920 the police force had increased to five members again (chief, two sergeants and two constables) and additional constable was added to the force in 1925. On June 1, 1926, the British Columbia Provincial Police took over policing of the City of Prince Rupert with a sergeant and five constables.
- Courtenay City Police - The City of Courtenay was incorporated on January 1, 1915. On April 22, 1915 the city appointed its first constable. By 1920 the city had a chief constable and one constable (the population of Courtenay in 1922 was 900). The British Columbia Provincial Police took over policing of the City of Courtenay on April 1, 1926 with a corporal and four constables stationed there (one constable assigned to the city with the rest policing the larger area district).
- Port Coquitlam Police - The City of Port Coquitlam was incorporated on March 7, 1913, with a population of about 1500. The first chief of police was appointed on April 17, 1913, along with three constables (one of these constable's salary was paid for by the Foundation Company). The police force did double duty as police and fire fighting until October 1914 when the duties were separated, this resulted in a two-person police force consisting of a chief of police and a constable. By 1925 the police force still consisted of the chief of police and one full-time constable. BC Provincial Police took over policing on April 1, 1926, with two provincial constables assigned to the city.
- Rossland Police - The City of Rossland was incorporated on March 18, 1897 (mining community). On July 5, 1897, the City of Rossland took over policing from the British Columbia Provincial Police by appointing a chief constable, sergeant and two constables. By February 1, 1902, the police force consisted of a chief constable, sergeant and one constable for a population of 7000. The BC Provincial Police took over policing for the City of Rossland at the end of July 1925 with one constable stationed there (the city's population was likely reduced by this time). Pg 40 of http://www.rosslandmuseum.ca/wp-content/uploads/2010-08-RShearer-Chinese.pdf
- Prince George City Police - The City of Prince George was incorporated on March 6, 1915. On July 10, 1915, the city appointed its first chief of police. In 1919 the population of Prince George was approximately 1600 and by 1920 the police force consisted of a chief of police and one constable. The British Columbia Provincial Police took over policing on June 15, 1925, with a sergeant, a corporal and two constables.
- Duncan Police - The City of Duncan was incorporated on March 4, 1912. On April 11, 1912 the city had appointed its first chief constable and one constable. By March 25, 1917 the city police consisted of a chief of police, a part-time deputy chief and one constable. By 1918 the City of Duncan had one constable (chief constable). By 1925 the city had a chief constable for a population of 1200. The British Columbia Provincial Police took over policing of the City of Duncan on June 1, 1925. The BCPP also decided in 1925 to make Duncan a headquarters for one of its new provincial police districts.
- Phoenix City Police - Phoenix was a mining city incorporated on August 31, 1900 (4 1/2 miles from the city of Greenwood BC). In December 1899 due to the rapid mining growth in the new community, a BC Provincial Police constable was stationed in Phoenix. On December 20, 1900, a chief of police was appointed for the city of Phoenix along with a night watchman. By 1903 the population was 1600 and the city still had a chief of police and night watchman, in 1905 the population was 1000. By 1918 the population was 1500 and quickly reduced to 700 when the mine closed in 1919, the city still had a chief of police. On October 1, 1920, the chief of police was one of the last residents of the city ensuring that materials were dismantled and to prevent any looting. The city and police no longer existed by the end of 1920.
- Sandon City Police - Sandon City was incorporated on January 1, 1898 (Sandon is a silver mining ghost town located in the Selkirk mountains between Kaslo and New Denver British Columbia). The first mention of a chief of police is February 11, 1899. The population at its height was around 5000 and by June 3, 1901, the police force consisted of a chief constable and one constable. By January 1913 the city had no police force as the population was too small to have a civic election however the city clerk was appointed the chief of police as well as many other duties. By April 9, 1920, the City of Sandon was dis-incorporated.
- Dominion Police - Maintained a federal policing presence in British Columbia from at least 1885 to November 1918. During railroad construction in 1885 (in Farwell BC) the North West Mounted Police provided policing and ensured no liquor was available for one mile on either side of the railway tracks. When the NWMP were dispatch to the North-West Rebellion in 1885, the Dominion Police took over these duties which then resulted in the "Great Liquor War" between the Dominion Police and the British Columbia Provincial Police in the summer of 1885. The Dominion Police also provided policing for the Esquimalt Dockyard in 1911 and during World War I (October 12, 1917), the Dominion Police were assisting the Military Police to enforce the War Measures Act in British Columbia until the end of 1918 when only two members of this force remained in British Columbia.
- Slocan Police - Slocan City was incorporated on June 1, 1901, as the centre of a silver mining boom. On July 10, 1901 a chief of police was appointed for the city. In 1902 the city population was 950 and policing of the city consisted of a chief of police and BC Provincial Police constable. By 1918 the population had dropped to 250, there was no chief of police and the city only had an elected police commissioner. Policing for the city continued by the BC Provincial Police until 1950 and on November 9, 1957, the city changed its status from city to village. Policing after August 1950 would have been provided by the RCMP in New Denver BC.
- North Saanich Police - The District of North Saanich was incorporated December 22, 1905 and de-municipalized by the Government of British Columbia on July 1, 1910. One constable was appointed for the district in 1909 and by January 29, 1910, there were two constables appointed, one for the east and one for the west district until July 1, 1910, when a judge decreed that the district never had legal existence. This is very likely the shortest term for the existence of a municipal police department in British Columbia.
- Columbia City Police - Columbia City, situated a few miles west from downtown Grand Forks BC, this city was incorporated on May 1, 1899, and had a special constable appointed. In 1900 the city had a population of 400 and had one constable and one constable (a British Columbia Provincial Police constable was also stationed at Columbia City). The cities of Columbia and Grand Forks united on January 7, 1903, and policing was taken over by Grand Forks city police on that date.
- Vancouver Island Colonial Police - 1849 - Policing on Vancouver Island was conducted by the Victoria Voltigeurs. The Voltigeurs existed as an armed, uniformed militia that served all Vancouver Island on an "as and when needed" basis. It is thought that they were primarily of Metis background. Following the end of their service, in 1854 a single town Constable (Thomas Hall) policed the early town core. On July 8, 1858, Vancouver Island Governor James Douglas appointed Augustus Pemberton as Commissioner of Police for the then British colony. Policing in Victoria pre-dated the city's founding (1862). Pemberton's appointment was published locally on July 17, 1858. The Governor had enlisted ten Jamaican men from San Francisco to form a police force. They arrived in Fort Victoria in April 1858 aboard the steamship, Commodore. They wore simple blue wool uniforms with tall blue hats. A red sash denoted their authority. The force only lasted about two months and was disbanded because of the racial strife the men attracted. The Police Department was a shared Crown Colony, Province and City establishment until February 4, 1873 when control and oversight policing the City of Victoria and a 6-mile radius was transferred over to the city.

== See also ==
- Policing in Canada
- List of law enforcement agencies in Canada
- Aboriginal Police in Canada
- List of emergency organizations in British Columbia
