= Integrated Security Unit =

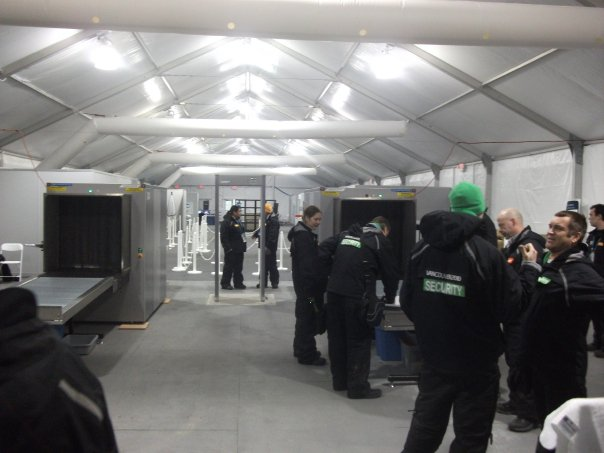
Security guard training at a portal to the Whistler Olympic and Paralympic Village.

An Integrated Safety and Security Group (ISSG; French: Groupe intégré de la sécurité - GIS), formerly known as an Integrated Security Unit (ISU), is a unified and coordinated task force comprising multiple law enforcement agencies in Canada. It is responsible for coordinating the safety and security for major national and international events, including the G7 Summit and the Olympics. This administrative and operational entity was first created by the Royal Canadian Mounted Police (RCMP) in 2003.

In 2003, the RCMP formed an ISSG for the 2010 Winter Olympics and for the 2010 Winter Paralympics in Vancouver. Subsequently, another ISSG was formed for the 2009 World Police and Fire Games. In 2010, the RCMP formed an ISSG to coordinate security planning and operations for the 36th G8 Summit in Huntsville (Ontario) and the 2010 G20 Summit in Toronto (Ontario). In 2015, an ISSG was activated for the 2015 Pan American Games and 2015 Parapan American Games held in Ontario. In 2018, the RCMP formed an ISSG to support the G7 Summit in La Malbaie, Quebec. Finally, in 2024, an ISSG has been created to lead safety and security efforts to the 2025 G7 Summit, to be held in Kananaskis, Alberta.

== 2009 World Police and Fire Games ==
The 13th World Police and Fire Games were held at Metro Vancouver in the summer of 2009. For the protection of international athletes and due to the presence of firearms in competition, importation of pharmaceutical products, and other restricted articles under Canadian law, the BC2009WPFGISU was formed to integrate all regulatory function.

Members included:

- Royal Canadian Mounted Police
- Canada Border Services Agency
- Vancouver Police Department
- Delta Police Department
- West Vancouver Police Department
- Abbotsford Police Department
- New Westminster Police Service

== 2010 Winter Olympic and Paralympic Games ==
Logo of the Integrated Security Unit for the 2010 Winter Olympics in Vancouver

The initial Integrated Safety and Security Group, then known as Integrated Security Unit, was established in 2003.

The Vancouver 2010 Integrated Security Unit (V2010 ISU or VISU) was initially started with a budget of $175 million CAD, the final expenditure was over $900 million. Private security cost $100 million.

The unit consisted of approximately 16,000 police, military and private security personnel:

- 4,000 RCMP personnel
- 1,700 members of 120 police and law enforcement agencies across Canada, including:
  - Vancouver Police Department
  - West Vancouver Police Department
  - Victoria Police Department
  - Central Saanich Police Service
  - Saanich Police Department
  - Delta Police Department
  - South Coast British Columbia Transportation Authority Police Service (Transit Police Service)
  - Nelson Police Department
  - British Columbia Conservation Officer Service
  - British Columbia Corrections Branch
  - British Columbia Sheriff Services
  - Canada Border Services Agency
  - Canadian Security Intelligence Service
  - Alberta Sheriffs Branch
  - Ontario Provincial Police
  - Sûreté du Québec
  - Royal Newfoundland Constabulary
  - Calgary Police
  - Edmonton Police Service
  - Taber Police Service
  - Winnipeg Police Service
  - Brandon Police Service
  - Hamilton Police Service
  - Saguenay Police
  - St-Eustache Police Service
  - Ottawa Police Service
  - Toronto Police Service
  - York Regional Police
  - Peel Regional Police
  - Waterloo Regional Police Service
  - Stratford Police Service
  - Service de police de la Ville de Montréal
  - Nishnawbe-Aski Police Service
  - Hanover Police Service
  - West Grey Police Service
- 5,000 members of the Canadian Armed Forces
- 4,800 private security screeners (Contemporary International [United States], United Protection Security Group [Canada], and Aeroguard [Canada]),
  - Canadian Avalanche Rescue Dog Association
  - NORAD

The unit was scaled down to 750 local RCMP officers, 500 military personnel and less than 6,000 private security personnel for the Paralympic Games.

== 2010 G8/G20 summits ==
Logo of the Integrated Security Unit for the 2010 summits

The Toronto Police, Ontario Provincial Police, the RCMP, York Regional Police and the Peel Regional Police had formed an ISU for the 2010 G20 Summit in Toronto, along with help from Canadian Armed Forces.

The Toronto Police Service and the OPP focused on providing policing at the G20 Summit site in downtown Toronto and immediate security zone. As for Toronto Pearson International Airport, the Canadian Armed Forces and Peel Regional Police focused their operations within the airport and its perimeter. For the G8 Summit in Huntsville (Ontario), the OPP, the RCMP and the Canadian Forces provided the main security coverage.

Approximately 1,600 police officers were mobilized from outside the Grand Toronto Area (GTA):

- Calgary Police: 162
- Waterloo Regional Police
- Niagara Regional Police: 100
- Hamilton Police Service: 88
- Stratford Police: 5
- Barrie Police: ESU
- Service de police de la Ville de Montréal.

== 2015 Pan American Games, Toronto ==
The ISU was activated again for the 2015 Pan American Games and 2015 Parapan American Games held in the Greater Toronto Area. It consisted of 10 police units:

- Ontario Provincial Police
- Toronto Police Service
- Hamilton Police Service
- Durham Regional Police
- Peel Regional Police
- York Regional Police
- Niagara Regional Police
- Halton Regional Police
- South Simcoe Police Service
- Royal Canadian Mounted Police

Additional units included:

- Canada Border Services Agency
- Canadian Armed Forces
- Canadian Security Intelligence Service

The OPP was the lead agency of the ISU for this event.

== 2018 G7 Summit ==
An ISU was activated for the 2018 G7 Summit held in La Malbaie, QC. The RCMP was the lead agency and partnered with the following agencies:

- Canadian Armed Forces
- Sûreté du Québec
- Service de police de la Ville de Québec (Quebec City Police Service)
- Service de sécurité publique de Saguenay (Saguenay Police Service)

== See also ==
- 2010 G-20 Toronto summit protests
- Black bloc
