= Protective intelligence =

Type of threat assessment

Protective Intelligence (PI), is a subsection of executive protection and a type of threat assessment. PI is a proactive method of identifying, assessing, and mitigating possible threats to the client. It is meant to reduce the ability of an individual from getting close enough to attack the client or even the likelihood of them deciding to attack.

== Methods ==
A PI analyst collects information through investigative methods, open source research, specialized databases, and other records on those who have the means and the interest in harming their client.

Red team analysis is often conducted by PI analysts to help identify security threats to the client by looking from the outside in. This can include physical security assessments, such as observing the client’s schedule or transportation route and determining the points of vulnerability. Red team analysis for PI also includes cyberstalking the client through open source research to determine how much sensitive information is available to potential attackers. Countersurveillance operations are used to make it more difficult for an attack to be planned as well. PI analysts help focus these operations and identify the areas most likely to be exploited, analyze the operations' findings, and investigate any individuals of interest who are detected.

== Components ==
PI’s three main functions are identification, assessment, and management/mitigation.

- Identification: The PI analyst must first determine where and how their client is vulnerable and who would want to exploit their vulnerability. The analyst then identifies these individuals who pose potential threats.
- Assessment: Assessment occurs after an individual is identified as a potential threat to the client. A variety of tools and methods are employed during this phase of PI to evaluate the threat's legitimacy, severity, motive, if they have the means to attack and how to protect the client. Some sources that the analyst can use include interviews from the individual or others who know them, records on the individual and background checks, writings by or about the individual, or travel and purchase receipts from the individual.
- Management/Mitigation: If the investigation shows the individual is not a threat then the case is closed, though the investigation and the individual's information is kept on record. If the investigation proves the individual is a threat, then the analyst will monitor the threat and occasionally perform reassessments. Monitoring can take the shape of surveilling social media accounts, physical surveillance, or reaching out to a third party that is connected to the individual. The analyst also provides the rest of the executive protection team with an unbiased explanation of who the individual is and why they represent a threat.

== The team ==
PI analysts often interact with a number of other professionals when working in executive protection. Psychologists act as consultants to advise the team if an individual of interest has or appears to have a mental illness. Human resource managers and employee mental health program organizers are able to alert the team if an employee has shown the potential to become violent and to then help divert them from that path. Physical security guards work alongside the analysts, relying on them to provide pictures and information on possibly threatening individuals. The client, as well as their staff and family, can also be briefed on any important information pertaining to their security and the measures they should take to ensure it.

== The clients ==
The most common clients that utilize PI are international dignitaries, high ranking politicians, wealthy corporate executives, and celebrities. Other clients can include schools and business that wish to guard against mass shootings.

== See also ==
- Integrated Security Unit
