= BCPP =

BCPP is an abbreviation for:

- Board Certified Psychiatric Pharmacists
- Botswana Combination Prevention Project
- Brierley Carey Pool Party
- British Columbia Provincial Police
- Prague Stock Exchange, in Czech Burza cenných papírů Praha
- “Borshchahivskiy CPP” is the pharmaceutical plant in Ukraine http://bcpp.com.ua/en/pro-kompaniyu
- Bovine contagious pleuropneumonia
