= Stanley Evans (writer) =

Canadian writer

- Born: 1931 (age 94–95); England
- Occupation: Writer
- Writing career
- Genres: Mystery, crime fiction

Stanley Evans (born 1931) is a full-time Canadian writer who has been a soldier, a surveyor, and deep-sea fisherman. He was born in England, immigrated to Canada in 1954 and currently resides in Victoria, British Columbia. He began his career by writing articles for newspapers and magazines. He has written two plays that were produced at the Arts Club in Vancouver, and has published several novels. Since 2005, he has published annual novels in a mystery series featuring a Coast Salish man as an investigator.

== Early life and education ==
Evans was born in England of Welsh descent. After graduating from college, he worked as a college instructor. At the age of 23, he emigrated to Canada, where he has settled in Victoria, British Columbia. He worked for some time as a deep-sea fisherman.

== Career ==
He began his writing career by publishing stories in newspapers and magazines. Some drew from his experiences as a soldier and deep-sea fisherman.

Two of his plays were produced at the Arts Club in Vancouver.

== Works ==
These two novels featured Sergeant Decker, a British Columbia frontier law official.

- Outlaw Gold (1996)
- Snow-Coming Moon (1997)

Evans has more recently written a series of mystery/crime fiction novels featuring Silas Seaweed, a Coast Salish who is an investigator with the Victoria Police Department. Published by TouchWood Editions, the series includes:

- Seaweed on the Street (2005)
- Seaweed on Ice (2006)
- Seaweed Under Water (2007), received the Monday Magazine Best Novel of 2007 award
- Seaweed on the Rocks (2008)
- Seaweed in the Soup (2009)
- Seaweed in the Mythworld (2011)

== Critical reception ==
Evans' books have received positive reviews in the Canadian press, and on mystery genre websites.

- "Victoria author Stanley Evans’ series protagonist, forty-year-old Coast Salish hard-boiled street cop, Silas Seaweed, has a lot in common with others of his ilk–a taste for the sauce, an eye for the babes, a liking for rough justice, a disdain for police bureaucrats, a sympathy for the underdog and as much independence as his feral cat, PC, that he shares his one-man office with. But what sets Seaweed apart is his First Nation heritage, the off-beat characters that surround him, and his ability to call upon the traditions of his people’s distant past to solve crimes of the present. And despite Evans’ admissions that the Warrior Reserve where Seaweed lives and the Mohawt Bay Band of which Silas is a member do not exist, there is an authentic ring to each of the novels in the series that makes the settings, characters and stories significantly entertaining." M. Wayne Cunningham for MysteriousReviews.com

- "Makes great use of West Coast aboriginal mythology and religion… Let's hope Silas Seaweed returns." The Globe and Mail

- "… written with strong plots … worth reading and lingering over." The Hamilton Spectator

- "Silas Seaweed’s insouciant charm is infectious, Evans’ characters from the underbelly of society are superb and critical observations of Vancouver Island society are refreshingly candid and often revealing." ABCBookWorld.com

- "Among Canada's most exciting new crime fiction. They are written in clean, crisp prose...They capture that strange mix of natural beauty and rough-around-the-edges humanity that is the essence of Vancouver Island." Calgary Herald
