= Victoria Police Department =

- VicPD Heraldic badge

- Past style ID badge of VicPD
- Abbreviation: VicPD
- Motto: Honour through Service

Agency overview
- Formed: July 1858
- Employees: 349
- Volunteers: 78

Jurisdictional structure
- Operations jurisdiction: Esquimalt, Victoria, Canada
- Governing body: Victoria Police Board
- Constituting instrument: BC Police Act
- General nature: Local civilian police

Operational structure
- Headquarters: 850 Caledonia Avenue
- Police constables: 243
- Civilians: 106
- Elected officers responsible: The Honourable Nina Kreiger, Minister of Public Safety and Solicitor General of British Columbia; Her Worship Marianne Alto, Mayor & Chair of the Victoria Police Board
- Agency executive: Fiona Wilson, Chief Constable

Facilities
- Stations: 2: 850 Caledonia Ave; 500 Park Place

Website
- vicpd.ca

The Victoria Police Department (VicPD) is the municipal police force for the City of Victoria and the Township of Esquimalt, British Columbia, Canada. It is the oldest municipal police department in Canada west of the Great Lakes, the first Canadian law enforcement agency to deploy tasers and VicPD created the first digital forensic unit in the country. They are also one of the few police departments in Canada to use the G36 rifle.

VicPD is currently headed by Chief Fiona Wilson, who took office on August 27, 2025.

== History ==
Policing on Vancouver Island was conducted by the Victoria Voltigeurs. The Voltigeurs existed as an armed, uniformed militia that served all Vancouver Island on an "as and when needed" basis. It is thought that they were primarily of Metis background. Following the end of their service, in 1854 a single town constable (Thomas Hall) policed the early town core.

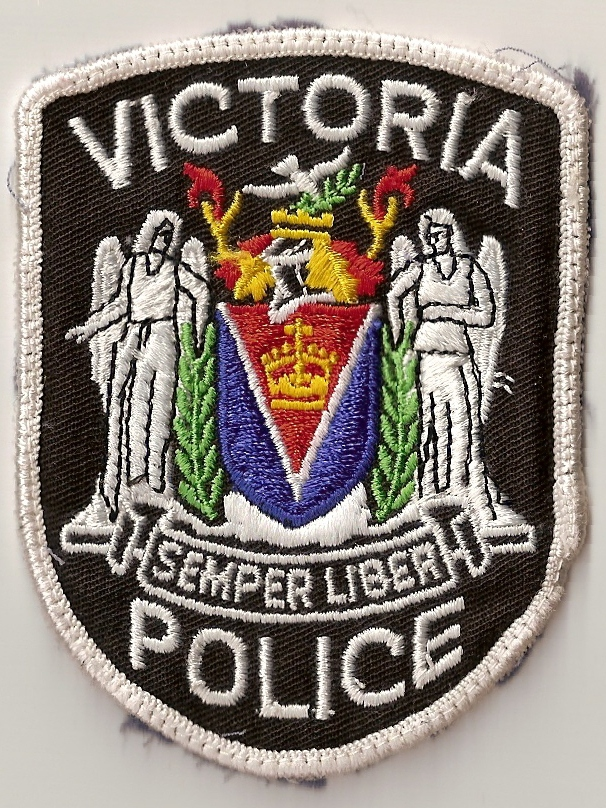
Shoulder flash prior to June 2010

On July 8, 1858, Vancouver Island Governor James Douglas appointed Augustus Pemberton as commissioner of police for the then-British colony. Policing in Victoria pre-dated the city's founding (1862). Pemberton's appointment was published locally on July 17, 1858. The Governor had enlisted ten Jamaican men from San Francisco to form a police force. They arrived in Fort Victoria in April 1858 aboard the steamship, Commodore. They wore simple blue wool uniforms with tall blue hats. A red sash denoted their authority. The force only lasted about two months and was disbanded because of the racial strife the men attracted.

The department was a shared Crown colony, province and city establishment through until the mid-1870s when control and oversight of the department was left with the young City of Victoria.

The VicPD honours the memory of six officers who have lost their lives serving the citizens of Greater Victoria; the first officer, Constable Johnston Cochrane, was murdered in 1859 and his death is marked as the first known law enforcement death in the Province of British Columbia. The most recent line of duty death was the death of Constable Ian Jordan in 2018. Cst. Jordan had been tragically injured in a vehicle crash in 1987. The VicPD and their associated Victoria Police Historical Society placed a memorial cairn at their headquarters on Caledonia Avenue inscribing all six names.

== Operations ==
The VicPD is a moderate sized police agency with two stations:

- Main Headquarters Building in Victoria, 850 Caledonia Ave
- West Division in Esquimalt - shared facility with Esquimalt Fire Department and former Township of Esquimalt Public Safety Building

Neighbourhood patrol areas are:

- Esquimalt
  - Panhandle
  - Selkirk
  - Colville
  - Parklands
  - Rockheights
- Devonshire
- West Bay
- Esquimalt Village
  - Saxe Point
- Victoria
  - Burnside
  - Hillside/Quadra
  - North Park
  - Oaklands
  - Victoria West
  - Downtown
  - Harris Green
  - Fernwood
  - North Jubilee
  - Rockland
  - James Bay
  - Fairfield
  - Gonzales

Previous VicPD headquarters:

- Fort Victoria
- Victoria Voltigeurs Encampment at Swan Creek and Colquitz Creek area
- Bastion Square Gaol 1860-1880s
- Victoria City Hall 1880s-1918
- Fisgard Street 1918-1996

== Organization ==
The Victoria Police are headed by Chief Constable Fiona Wilson and have a total strength of 241 sworn officers.

Sections and units:

- Main headquarters
  - Patrol
  - Focused enforcement team (FET)
    - Bike squad
    - Beat officers
    - Traffic section
    - CRASH reconstruction team
    - Community resource officers
  - Investigative services
    - VIIMCU (Vancouver Island Integrated Major Crime Unit)
    - Major crimes
    - Financial crimes
    - Special victims unit
    - Forensic services
      - Forensic identification (IDENT)
      - Computer forensics
  - Crime prevention and public affairs
    - Public affairs
    - Block Watch
    - Volunteer services
    - Reserve program
    - Crime-Free Multi-Housing Program
  - Operational planning and support
  - 911 communication centre
  - Greater Victoria Emergency Response Team (GVERT)
  - Strike force and street crime
  - Exhibit control and purchasing
  - Human resources
  - Records
  - Information technology
- West Division
  - School liaison officers
  - Youth investigators
  - Community resource officer
  - K-9 units

The force also recruits reserve constables, otherwise known as "auxiliary constables".

== Rank structure ==
| Rank | Chief of police/chief constable | Deputy chief/deputy chief constable | Superintendent | Inspector | Staff sergeant |
|---|---|---|---|---|---|
| Insignia | | | | | |
| Rank | Sergeant | Police constable 1st class/detective | Police constable 2nd class | Police constable 3rd class | Police constable 4th class (includes recruit constables) |
| Insignia | | | | | |

== List of chief constables ==
| Number | Name | Tenure |
|---|---|---|
| 1 | Francis O'Connor | 1858–1880 |
| 2 | Charles Bloomfield | 1880–1888 |
| 3 | Henry Sheppard | 1888–1900 |
| 4 | John Langley | 1900–1918 |
| 5 | John Fry | 1918–1931 |
| 6 | Unknown | 1931–1950 |
| 7 | John Blackstock | 1950–1963 |
| 8 | John Gregory | 1963–1980 |
| 9 | Bill Snowdon | 1980–1991 |
| 10 | Douglas Richardson | 1991–1999 |
| 11 | Paul Battershill | 1999–2008 |
| – | Bill Naughton (interim) | 2008–2009 |
| 12 | Jamie Graham | 2009–2013 |
| 13 | Frank Elsner | 2013–2017 |
| 14 | Del Manak | 2017–2025 |
| 15 | Fiona Wilson | 2025–present |

== Integrated road safety unit (IRSU) ==
Four VicPD officers are seconded to the 15-member IRSU. The IRSU is mandated as "providing intelligence led enforcement while targeting aggressive driving behaviors, reducing alcohol-related crashes, distracted driving and encouraging the use of seatbelts and front license plates." within the Capital Regional District. This unit comprises officers from the Saanich Police Department, Victoria Police Department, Oak Bay Police Department, Central Saanich Police and the RCMP under an agreement with the BC Ministry of Public Safety and solicitor general and they patrol in specially marked cars and are able to enforce laws outside their municipal jurisdiction.

== Museum ==
In late 2014, the onsite police museum at the Victoria police station Caledonia headquarters was closed. The 150 years of policing artifacts from the early days of British Columbia to recent times were moved into storage. The VicPD Hall of Honour, which celebrates the accomplishments of both sworn and civilian staff was created in its place. The Hall of Honour was officially opened to the public on September 29, 2015.

== In literature ==
Victoria resident Stanley Evans has written a series of mysteries featuring a Coast Salish character, Silas Seaweed, who works as an investigator with the Victoria Police Department.

== See also ==
- Combined Forces Special Enforcement Unit of British Columbia
