= Organized Crime Agency of British Columbia =

- Abbreviation: OCABC

Agency overview
- Formed: March 11, 1999
- Superseding agency: Combined Forces Special Enforcement Unit - British Columbia

Jurisdictional structure
- Operations jurisdiction: British Columbia, Canada
- Constituting instrument: BC Police Act
- General nature: Civilian police

Website
- www.ocabc.org

The Organized Crime Agency of British Columbia (OCABC) is a Designated Policing and Law Enforcement Unit under the Police Act (B.C.) established on March 11, 1999. Similar to the structure and authority of municipal police departments in British Columbia, OCABC is an independent policing agency. The specific mandate of the OCABC is to facilitate the disruption and suppression of organized crime.

The OCABC was created in direct response to the recommendations of the report of the Organized Crime Independent Review Committee, chaired by Stephen Owen ("The Owen Report", September 15, 1998). The agency was incorporated as a society in March 1999 under the BC Police Act to replace its forerunner, the Coordinated Law Enforcement Unit (CLEU). The Owen Report found CLEU to be "… not sufficiently equipped, mandated or able to cope with the growing sophistication and diversity of organized crime". The OCABC became fully operational in February 2000, similar in structure and authority to other municipal police departments in British Columbia. As a designated police agency in the province of British Columbia, the OCAB has its own contingent of sworn law enforcement officers and civilian personnel, and is responsible for:

"Providing designated Policing and designated Law Enforcement to reduce and eliminate organized crime and other significant criminal activity in British Columbia." The OCABC derives its powers from sections 4.1 (2) (c) and 18.1 (d) of the Police Act.

== Structure ==
During Rich Coleman’s term as solicitor general, the province increased its move toward more integration in policing as both a cost-saving measure by reducing duplication of efforts, and in order to solidify the agency's impact as an aggressive organized crime fighting unit. In 2004, this restructuring aligned the OCABC with its law enforcement partners into the Combined Forces Special Enforcement Unit – British Columbia (CFSEU-BC). It is under this agency name that organized crime projects are investigated and prosecuted. The CFSEU-BC integrated 14 law enforcement agencies, including the OCABC and the RCMP, under one single command structure with oversight provided by a chief superintendent. The intent was to integrate the OCAB, municipal police and the RCMP into one combined unit to coordinate the province’s response to the growing threat of organized crime and gang violence.

== Operations ==
In 2002-2003, the agency participated in Project Blizzard with Alberta and U.S. authorities in investigating drug trafficking. This project had 689,000 pseudoephedrine tablets, 64.7 kilograms of cocaine, 3,353 pounds of marijuana, and $4 million seized. The five-month Project Longhaul in 2003 investigated distribution and transportation of marijuana, ecstasy, and ephedrine from British Columbia to Ontario and the U.S. and resulted in 3,872 pounds of marijuana, 20,000 tablets of ecstasy, and 218.2 kilograms of ephedrine being seized. Project Longhaul II specifically focused on BC bud and had 1,595 pounds of marijuana, and 461 marijuana plant clones seized.
