= Central Saanich Police Service =

Police force in British Columbia, Canada

Central Saanich Police Service Service de police de Central Saanich
- Heraldic Badge of CSPS
- Abbreviation: CSPS
- Motto: Strength Through Community

Agency overview
- Formed: 1951
- Employees: 31
- Volunteers: 3
- Annual budget: 3.8 million CDN

Jurisdictional structure
- Operations jurisdiction: Central Saanich, British Columbia, Canada
- Governing body: Central Saanich Police Board
- Constituting instrument: BC Police Act
- General nature: Local civilian police

Operational structure
- Headquarters: 1903 Mount Newton X-Road, Central Saanich, Canada 48.59474834714689°N 123.42077091008832°W
- Police constables: 28
- Civilians: 6
- Elected officers responsible: The Honourable Mike Farnworth, Minister of Public Safety and Solicitor General of British Columbia; His Worship Ryan Windsor, Mayor & chair of the Central Saanich Police Board
- Agency executive: Ian Lawson, chief constable

Website
- http://www.cspolice.ca/

The Central Saanich Police Service (CSPS; French: Service de police de Central Saanich) is the police force for the district municipality of Central Saanich, British Columbia, Canada. Currently headed by Chief Constable Ian Lawson with 28 constables, five of whom are seconded to Combined Forces Special Enforcement Unit (CFSEU), regional crime unit, IRSU and the National Weapons Enforcement Support Team

== History ==
The Central Saanich Police Department came to life when the Corporation of the District of Central Saanich was created in 1951. It was later renamed to the present name of Central Saanich Police Service in the late 1990s.

== Integrated Road Safety Unit (IRSU) ==
One CSPS officer is seconded to the 15 member unit IRSU. IRSU is mandated to "providing intelligence led enforcement while targeting aggressive driving behaviors, reducing alcohol-related crashes and encouraging the use of seatbelts" within the Capital Regional District. This unit consists of officers from several police departments, including the Saanich Police Department, Victoria Police Department, Oak Bay Police Department, Central Saanich Police and the RCMP under an agreement with the BC Ministry of Public Safety and the solicitor general. They patrol in specially marked cars and are able to enforce laws outside their municipal jurisdictions.

== See also ==
- Combined Forces Special Enforcement Unit of British Columbia
