= British Columbia Provincial Police =

- Badge of the BCPP
- Abbreviation: BCPP
- Motto: Splendor Sine Occasu (Latin for 'Splendour without deminishment')

Agency overview
- Formed: 1858
- Dissolved: August 15, 1950
- Superseding agency: RCMP "E" Division

Jurisdictional structure
- Operations jurisdiction: British Columbia, Canada
- General nature: Civilian police

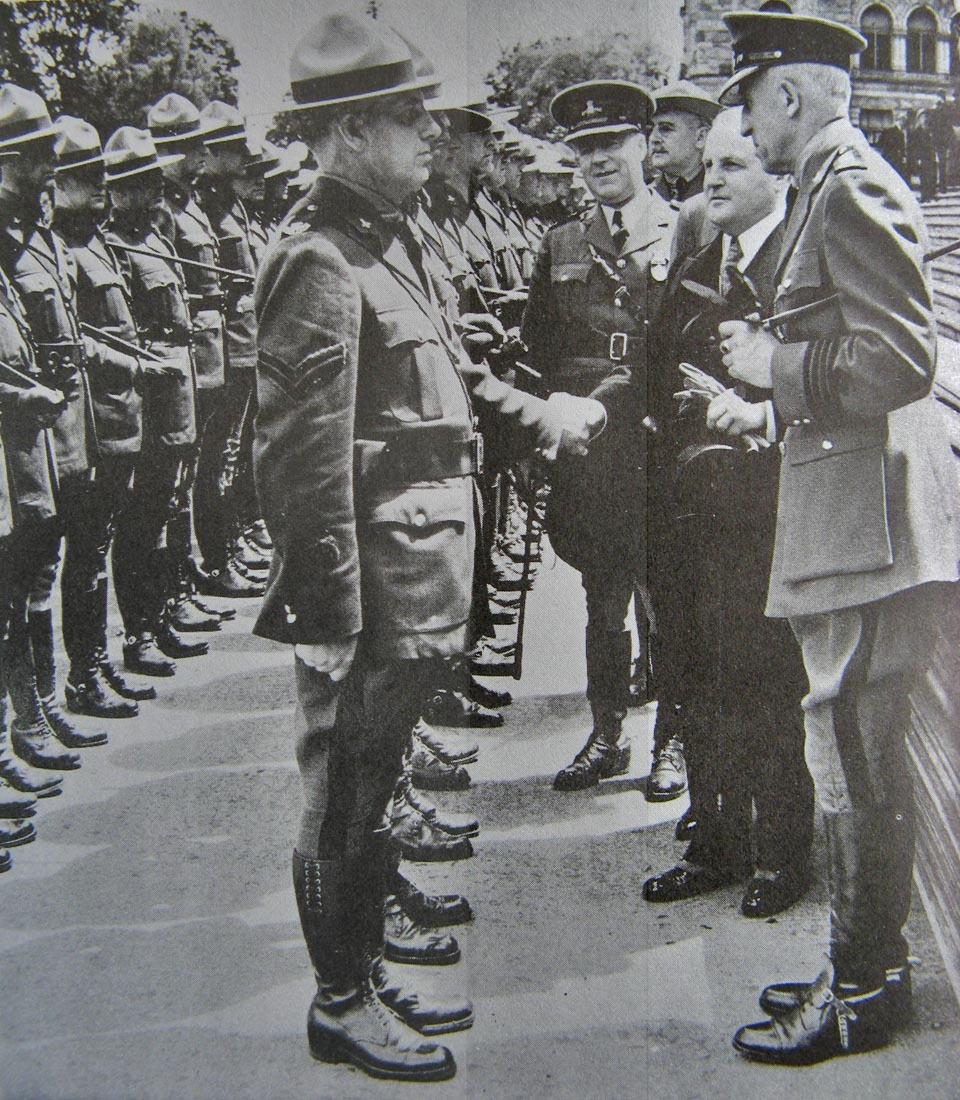
Inspection of the BCPP during the 1939 royal visit

The British Columbia Provincial Police (BCPP) was the provincial police service of British Columbia, Canada, between 1858 and 1950.

One of the first law enforcement agencies in North America, the British Columbia Provincial Police was formed to police the new Colony of British Columbia in 1858, with Chartres Brew as the de facto chief constable. The BCPP preceded the Canadian Confederation by nine years, the North-West Mounted Police by fifteen years, and the Ontario Provincial Police by seventeen years. Brew, a former member of the Royal Irish Constabulary and officially British Columbia's chief gold commissioner, was vested with the powers of a magistrate to maintain state security against possible rebellion by American migrants who came to British Columbia for its gold rush and the accompanying risk of annexation. The BCPP was deeply integrated into British Columbia's new colonial administration due to geographic isolation and small population, holding numerous unusual responsibilities such as registrars, tax collectors, statisticians, meteorologists, and postmasters. Over time, the BCPP transitioned into a purely law enforcement agency, providing provincial and municipal police services across the British Columbia mainland and Vancouver Island.

The British Columbia Provincial Police was dissolved on August 15, 1950, and replaced by the Royal Canadian Mounted Police's "E" Division.

== History ==
=== Formation ===
The British Columbia Provincial Police (BCPP) was established in 1858, with the responsibility of policing the newly formed Colony of British Columbia, the westernmost mainland territory of British North America on the Pacific coast. The official founding of the BCPP is considered to be the appointment of Chartres Brew as the Gold commissioner of British Columbia, which at the time was experiencing a gold rush and a subsequent rapid growth in population due to the influx of prospectors and gold miners. The situation worried the British, who feared an attempt by the United States to annex the colony by prompting rebellion among the migrants, many of whom were American, lived and worked in the gold fields outside of colonial governance, and were well-armed. The BCPP was formed in response with Brew as its de facto chief constable (never being officially appointed) under the title Chief Inspector of Police until 1863 and then Superintendent of Police until 1871. Brew was given an unusual amount of powers, both as British Columbia's Gold commissioner and as the Chief Constable of the provincial police, and was vested with the powers of a magistrate to maintain the security and to prevent potential rebellion in the isolated, sparsely populated colony.

The BCPP went through various name changes in its early years, and by 1871 they were called the British Columbia Constabulary. In 1871, the Colony of British Columbia joined Canada as a province, and the BCPP came under the authority of the attorney general. The reporting structure required the Superintendent of Police to report to the Attorney-General of Canada, and constables were under the direction of the government agent of the district who reported to the Superintendent. The mandate of the British Columbia Constabulary was to maintain peace and order, and to enforce the laws of the province under the authority of An Act respecting Police Constables (SBC 1880, c. 22, revised SBC 1888, c. 96). In 1895, under the new Provincial Police Act (SBC 1895, c. 45) the name was changed to the British Columbia Provincial Police Force. The duties of the force included patrolling the land, waterways, and coastline, enforcing laws, maintaining peace, policing strikes, controlling smuggling, and generally enforcing provincial statutes. Special constables were also deployed as required. In 1946, the force policed all rural areas and unincorporated settlements as well as forty municipalities throughout the province.

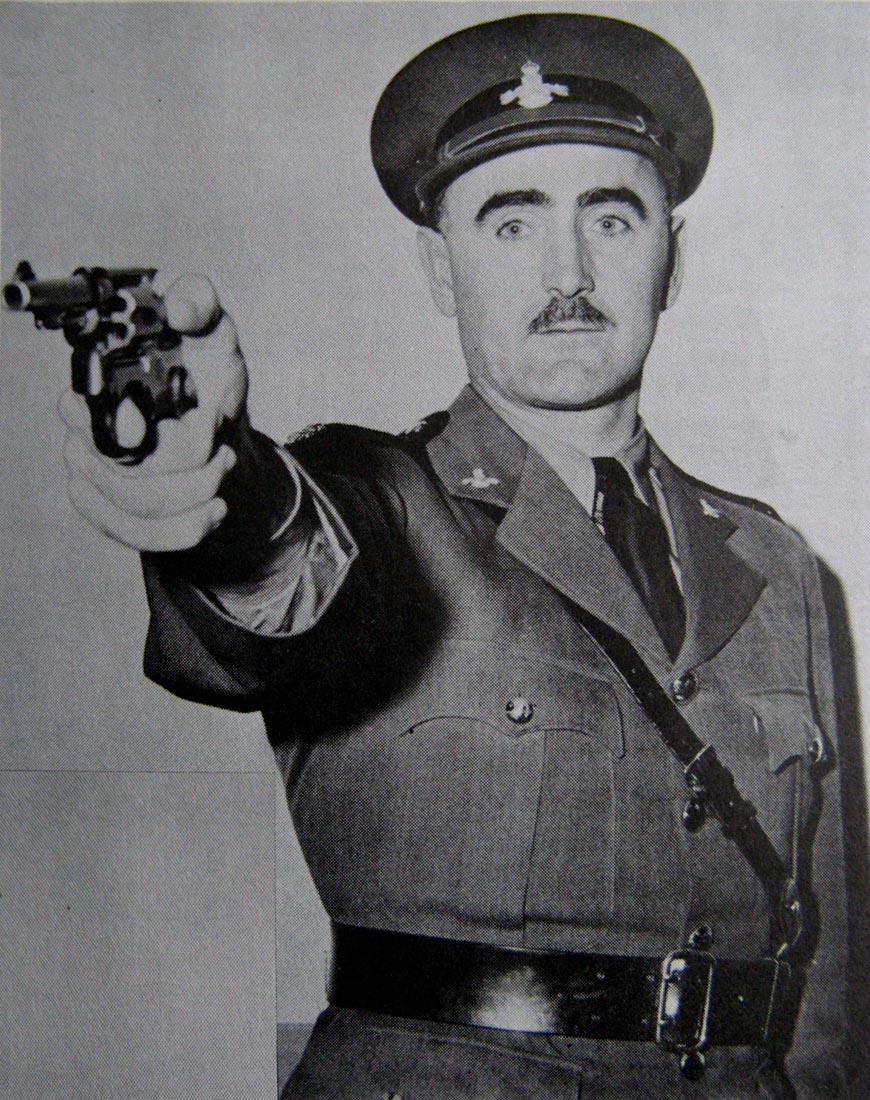
BCPP officer Jack Henry posing with a Smith & Wesson Model 10 revolver.

=== Vancouver Island ===
On June 1, 1858, Augustus Pemberton was appointed the Stipendiary for Victoria and Commissioner of Police in the city. The Police and Prisons Department of the Colony of Vancouver Island was established by Pemberton following his appointment in 1858, formalising law enforcement in the colony. That year, the population of the Colony of Vancouver Island had risen from a few hundred to many thousand, almost overnight, due to the influx of migrants related to the gold rush on the Fraser River in British Columbia. The newly appointed Commissioner of Police, who was also the Police Magistrate, was the representative of law and order in Vancouver Island and his immediate job was to organize a police force for the colony. He was responsible for the police stations and jails in Victoria and the neighbouring communities. Unlike the mainland, the Colony of Vancouver Island had a police force of one sort or another operating since the formation of the colony in 1849. The Victoria Voltigeurs were a semi-formal police composed of West Indians, Métis, and other so called "mixed bloods" recruited by Governor James Douglas, himself a mulatto from Guyana. The Voltigeurs wore colourful outfits, which to modern eyes were more like a military-dress parade uniform than modern police clothing, and were given 20 acres of land in exchange for service. From 1849 to 1853, the affairs of the Colony of Vancouver Island were also the affairs of the Hudson's Bay Company, and were administered by Governor Douglas and employees of the company. In 1853, Douglas had commissioned four citizens to serve as magistrates and justices of the peace for the three districts of the colony that comprised the area immediately west of Victoria. He then established a Supreme Court of Civil Justice for the colony. In 1854, Thomas Hall was appointed as the first paid constable on Vancouver Island, but records indicate Hall was also paid £7-5-10 for fourteen cords of wood in 1856, leading to questions about how much policing he was actually doing. Sometime before 1863, Captain William Hayes Franklyn was appointed magistrate in Nanaimo, and was assisted by Charles S. Nicol as the Justice of the Peace for Nanaimo in 1864. Nicol had been the sheriff of British Columbia between 1859 and 1860, and moved to Vancouver Island to be the manager of the Vancouver Coal Company in Nanaimo.

=== Amalgamation ===
Pemberton was Commissioner of Police until 1866 when the colonies of Vancouver Island and British Columbia were united into a single colony, and the police forces of the two colonies were amalgamated under Chartles Brew, later adopting the name of British Columbia Provincial Police. The force were engaged from within local communities, as per Brew's original policy on this matter based on his experience in Ireland, and until 1923 they were in plainclothes and had no uniform. By 1910, the force roster numbered 186 men. In 1923, the BCPP was reorganized and issued frontier-style khaki uniforms with green piping, flat-brimmed stetson hats, and Sam Browne belts, and a system of semi-military ranks was established. A training school was established for the first time, and a mounted troop, while the force's administration divided the province into divisions to better serve its geographically isolated regions.

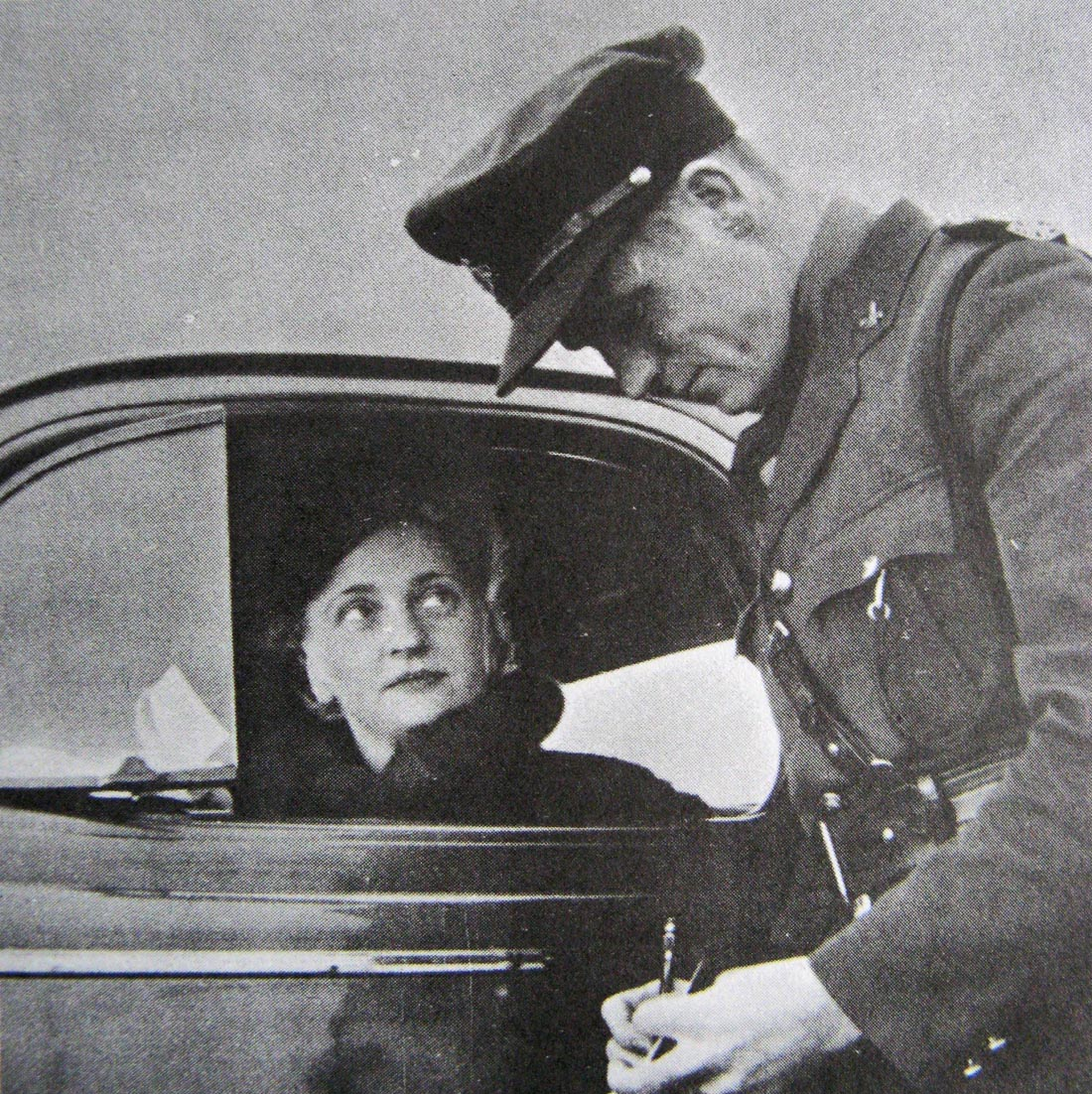
BCPP highway patrol officer issuing a ticket.

Before its Criminal Investigation Department was established in the 1920s, the BCPP contracted private detective agencies for criminal investigations and for surveillance of suspected radicals, and was Pinkerton's biggest client in Canada. Nevertheless, over a short period of time it became one of the most modern police agencies in the world, including the first inter-city radio telegraph system fully integrated with radio-equipped cars and coastal patrol vessels in North America, using high-frequency radios were designed and built in the police workshops. The BCPP became the first law-enforcement agency to develop an air arm, crime laboratories, and sophisticated sections for fingerprints, firearms and ballistics, identification, highway patrol, and investigation divisions.

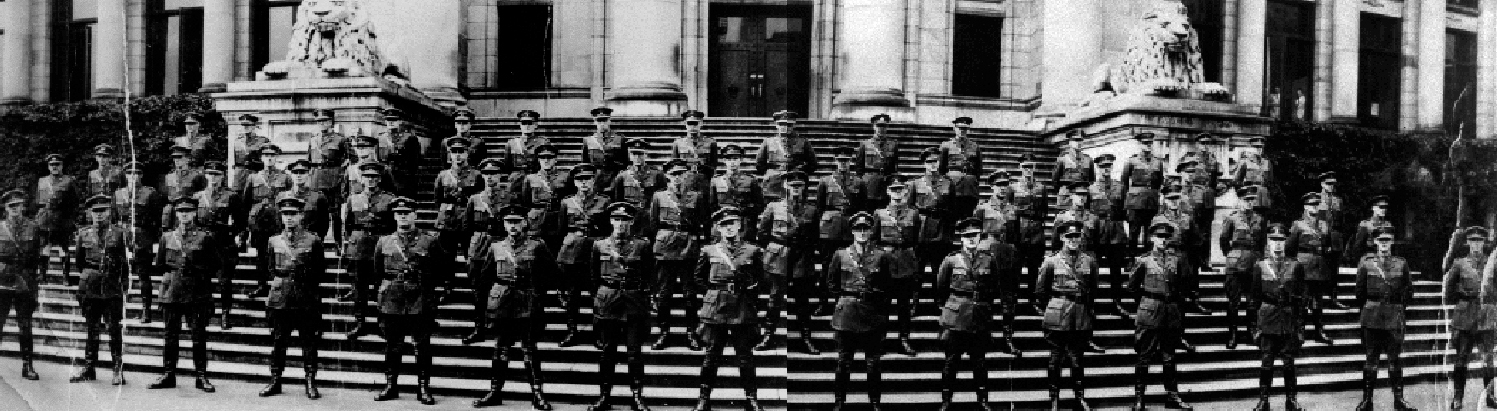
Special constables attached to the BCPP for the 1935 waterfront strike in Vancouver.

In the 1930s, the BCPP began to contract municipalities for local policing services, and during World War II the BCPP organized recruitment for the armed forces. Their general duties enforced fishing and hunting licences, providing customs and excise functions, livestock brand inspections, managed trap-line permits and dog licences, Vital Statistics and served civil court documents. They also functioned as Court prosecutors, jailers and prisoner escort and during the labour troubles in Vancouver during the Great Depression helped enforce martial law against strikers on Vancouver's troubled docks and evict protesters from the city's main post office. During that period, horses for the mounted squad were relocated from Vancouver Island to the Oakalla prison farm in Burnaby.

=== Dissolution ===
The British Columbia Provincial Police was controversially dissolved by British Columbia on 15 August 1950, with a force consisting of 520 men and a budget of $2,250,000. The 492 members who stayed on following the dissolution were taken on as part of the Royal Canadian Mounted Police's "E" Division, which has had the contract for provincial policing in British Columbia ever since. The BCPP's dissolution by the provincial government was deeply unpopular with British Columbia's residents at the time, to the point that the municipal council of Burnaby stated they "would not have the Mounted Police" in the town and confronted RCMP officers at the vacant BCPP offices.

== Continued interest in provincial policing ==
In 2010, Kash Heed, a former chief constable and MLA of the Legislative Assembly of British Columbia, suggested ending the RCMP's contract as the provincial police or introducing greater provincial government control over RCMP officers in the province, and considering the re-establishment of the BCPP as an alternative.

== Ranks ==
Known ranks of the BCPP:

- Commissioner
- Assistant Commissioner
- Inspector
- Sub-Inspector
- Staff Sergeant
- Sergeant
- Corporal
- Detective
- 1st Class Constable
- 2nd Class Constable
- 3rd Class Constable
- Special Constable

== Chief Constables ==
- Chartres Brew (1858–1870)
- Otway J.J. Wilkie, Chief Constable in New Westminster and Fraser Valley 1861-?

== See also ==
- Alberta Provincial Police
- British Columbia Sheriff Service
- Nova Scotia Police
- Saskatchewan Provincial Police
