= British Columbia Royal Canadian Mounted Police =

RCMP federal policing in British Columbia

RCMP "E" Division
- Heraldic badge of the RCMP
- Common name: The Mounties
- Abbreviation: "E" Division
- Motto: Maintiens le droit Defending the law

Agency overview
- Preceding agency: British Columbia Provincial Police
- Employees: 8,800+
- Volunteers: 1,200+

Jurisdictional structure
- Operations jurisdiction: British Columbia, Canada
- Constituting instruments: Royal Canadian Mounted Police Act; BC Police Act
- General nature: Civilian police

Operational structure
- Headquarters: 14200 Green Timbers Way, Surrey
- Police Constables: 7,093
- Civilians: 1,700+
- Elected officers responsible: The Honourable Dominic LeBlanc, Minister of Public Safety (Federal); The Honourable Mike Farnworth, Minister of Public Safety and Solicitor General of British Columbia
- Agency executive: Deputy Commissioner Dwayne McDonald, Commanding Officer, "E" Division

Facilities
- Helicopters: Two Eurocopter EC120 B: "Air 1" and "Air 2"

Website
- cb-bc.grc-rcmp.gc.ca

"E" Division is the division of the Royal Canadian Mounted Police (RCMP) in British Columbia (BC), Canada's westernmost province. It is the largest police force in the province, providing federal and provincial services throughout the area and providing municipal contract policing for all but a few municipalities. In some urban areas, municipalities have their own police forces, while neighbouring communities contract with E Division. For example, Richmond is patrolled by E Division while neighbouring Vancouver has its own police force; both organizations contribute members and resources to various regional initiatives. E Division is the largest RCMP division, with 144 local detachments.

Headquartered in Surrey, E Division is led by Deputy Commissioner Dwayne McDonald. The Division has about 7,100 sworn members along with some 1,700 civilian members and public service employees. Of the sworn members, about 1,000 are assigned to federal sections, 2,600 to provincial policing units, and over 3,000 members serve in municipal policing. The force is assisted by about 1,200 volunteer Auxiliary Constables.

== Organization ==
In BC, the RCMP operates at all three levels: federal, provincial, and municipal contract policing, except in communities served by municipal police departments. In this structure, they have the ability to mobilize large numbers of police officers from within the province and across Canada in the case of a crisis, and access a wide range of specialized units to tackle local and cross jurisdictional crimes. Through the integration of a number of specialized police services across BC, they have established an effective means by which to deal with cross-jurisdictional crimes and provide specialized services.

The BC RCMP is the lead agency for numerous integrated police units such as the Integrated Homicide Investigations Team, the Integrated Border Enforcement Team, the Integrated Municipal Provincial Auto Crime Team, and many others. These integrated teams are composed of police officers from the RCMP and municipal police departments such as Delta, Abbotsford and Vancouver.

=== Pipe Band ===
The RCMP "E" Division Pipe Band is composed of volunteers and active duty officers posted to the division. It is based in Greater Vancouver and is currently one of the eight RCMP Pipe Bands currently active in Canada. It was formed in April 2006, by Drum Major Rob Smith, who had been lobbying to create the band since 1998, with an early trial band ceasing operations in 2000. The band made its debut appearance on 28 October 2006, at the Scottish Cultural Centre in Vancouver. In 2008, Hugh Peden took over as Pipe Major, being responsible for its overseas trip to Beijing, China in 2016.

== Programs ==
=== National ===
- Border Integrity Program – protect Canada's sovereignty at land and sea borders with CBSA.
- Canadian Air Carrier Protection Program is a covert unit that works similar to US Air Marshals. The officers on this unit are known as Aircraft Protective Officers or, internationally, as In-Flight Security Officers.
- Drug Enforcement Branch – investigate and dismantle drug labs and drug trafficking
- Protective Services Section – protects government officials such as the Governor General, Prime Minister, Premiers and VIPs (e.g. foreign heads of state and heads of government)

=== Provincial/Regional Integrated Units ===
- Air 1 and Air 2 (Lower Mainland Traffic Safety Helicopter Program) – Provide air support to police and monitor traffic movements
- Crisis Intervention Team (CIT) – Crisis support for people with mental health or emotionally disturbed crisis.
- Integrated Child Exploitation (ICE) – Responsible for identifying and assisting child victims of sexual abuse, monitoring and prosecuting child pornography distributor and viewers.
- Integrated First Nations Unit (IFNU) – Partnership with West Vancouver Police Department for enhanced policing services to reserves for the Squamish Nation and Tsleil-Waututh First Nation.
- Integrated Homicide Investigation Team (IHIT) – Responsible for homicide investigations, police involved shootings and in-custody deaths at RCMP Lower Mainland detachment areas and in Abbotsford and New Westminster.
- Integrated Market Enforcement Team (IMET) – targeting commercial and capital market frauds
- Integrated National Security Enforcement Team (E-INSET) – investigate any crimes that threatens national security. Active in the 2008–09 British Columbia pipeline bombings.
  - INSET-Vancouver: A joint venture between the E Division and Vancouver Police Department, operate out of VPD facilities instead of the INSET-BC Surrey operation base.
- Integrated Municipal Provincial Auto Crime Team (IMPACT) – Bait car program
- Integrated Proceeds of Crime (IPOC) – targeting and seizing terrorist-related assets
- Integrated Road Safety Unit (IRSU) – Partnering with municipal agencies for strategic traffic enforcement and harm reduction (i.e. impaired/distracted drivers, seatbelt and childseat compliance). Now uses the brand "BC Highway Patrol".
- Integrated Forensic Identification Services (IFIS) – collect, process, analyze and interpret evidence found at the crime scene for RCMP Lower Mainland detachments.

=== Defunct programmes ===
- Vancouver 2010 Integrated Security Unit – a special task force created to help prevent criminal activity during the 2010 Winter Olympics and 2010 Winter Paralympics held in Vancouver, BC.

== Controversies ==
Like many large police organizations, E Division has had a number of high-profile controversies. One of the most notable was the 2007 death of Robert Dziekański, who was tasered multiple times after being encountered by four E division officers despite being unarmed and being held alone in a secured room at Vancouver International Airport. Attracting international media attention, the investigation took a turn when a cellphone video, taken by a member of the public behind a glass wall and released weeks after the incident, contradicted portions of the reports given by the officers involved and also some RCMP spokespersons. In addition, several officers have been documented as engaging in misconducts in recent years. This has led to the federal government revamping disciplinary laws for RCMP members in 2012.

== See also ==
- Combined Forces Special Enforcement Unit of British Columbia
- List of controversies involving the Royal Canadian Mounted Police
- List of incidents of police excessive use of force in Canada
