= Nelson Police Department =

- Heraldic badge of Nelson PD
- Abbreviation: NPD

Agency overview
- Formed: April 17, 1897

Jurisdictional structure
- Operations jurisdiction: Nelson, British Columbia, Canada
- Governing body: Nelson Police Board
- Constituting instrument: BC Police Act
- General nature: Local civilian police

Operational structure
- Headquarters: 606 Stanley Street
- Police constables: 20
- Elected officers responsible: The Honourable Mike Farnworth, Minister of Public Safety and Solicitor General of British Columbia; Her Worship Janice Morrison, Mayor of Nelson & Chair of the Nelson Police Board
- Agency executive: Donovan Fisher, Chief Constable

Website
- http://www.nelsonpolice.ca

The Nelson Police Department is the police force for the City of Nelson, British Columbia, Canada.

Among the oldest police services in British Columbia, the force came into being as a municipal police force on April 17, 1897. The initial force consisted of one chief constable and one constable. Over the years of its existence, the Nelson Police Department has grown from two to twenty members. Chief Constable Donovan Fisher has been the Chief Constable since 2021.

Nelson Police Department is one of twelve municipal police forces in British Columbia. The department is governed under the authority of the BC Police Act.

== Nelson Police Board ==
- Board Chair: Mayor Janice Morrison (since 2022)
- Director: Lindsay MacKay by Municipal Appointment (since 2022)
- Director: Devon Caron by Provincial Appointment (since 2022)
- Director: Jane Byers by Provincial Appointment(since 2019)
- Director: Lena Horswill by Provincial Appointment (since 2019)
- Director: Sue Adam by Provincial Appointment (since 2018)
