= Metro Vancouver Transit Police =

Police force for the Metro Vancouver public transit system in Canada

Coordinates: 49°13′29.35″N 122°53′30.49″W

South Coast British Columbia Transportation Authority Police Service
- Heraldic badge of the SCBCTAPS
- Common name: Metro Vancouver Transit Police
- Abbreviation: MVTP (branding); SCBCTAPS (official)
- Motto: Safely Linking Communities

Agency overview
- Formed: December 4, 2005
- Preceding agencies: TransLink Security special constables (1999); BC Transit Security special constables (1985)
- Employees: 234
- Annual budget: $32 million

Jurisdictional structure
- Operations jurisdiction: Metro Vancouver Regional District, Canada
- Area: 134 km (83 mi) of heavy and light rail track, 57 rail stations, over 195 bus routes, 3 passenger ferries
- Population: 2,463,700 in 2,877 km^{2} (1,111 sq mi) (Metro Vancouver)
- Constituting instruments: BC Police Act; South Coast British Columbia Transportation Authority Act
- General nature: Civilian police

Operational structure
- Overseen by: South Coast British Columbia Transportation Authority Police Service Board
- Headquarters: 300 - 287 Nelson's Court, New Westminster
- Police officers: 167
- Civilians: 67
- Elected officer responsible: Nina Krieger, Minister of Public Safety and Solicitor General of British Columbia
- Agency executive: Suzanne Muir, chief officer
- Parent agency: South Coast British Columbia Transportation Authority
- Units: Patrol, Communications, Explosive Detection Dog, Bicycle Patrol, Crime Reduction, Intelligence, Training & Recruiting, Professional Standards
- Division Offices: West - Richmond

Facilities
- Explosives detection dogs: 4 Labrador Retrievers

Website
- transitpolice.ca
- Mark Reder is the chair of the Transit Police Board. Unlike other similar organizations in British Columbia, he is not elected into position.

The Metro Vancouver Transit Police (MVTP), previously the Greater Vancouver Transportation Authority Police Service and formally the South Coast British Columbia Transportation Authority Police Service (SCBCTAPS), is the police force for TransLink, the public transit system of the Metro Vancouver region of British Columbia, Canada.

Formed in December 2005, the Metro Vancouver Transit Police is the only police force in Canada solely dedicated to transit, as most other cities use a combination of special constables and a transit division of their local police. The MVTP is a supplementary police agency with the jurisdictional police agency retaining primary responsibility for policing in each jurisdiction they serve.

MVTP officers have the same authorities and powers as other police officers while on and off duty. They are sworn in as designated constables under the Police Act, with full police powers throughout Metro Vancouver. They focus their efforts primarily on protecting the safety and security of passengers, employees, property, and revenue of Metro Vancouver's transit system.

The MVTP partners with local municipal police forces and Royal Canadian Mounted Police (RCMP) in enforcing laws in the Metro Vancouver region. If requested, MVTP officers will also respond to emergencies outside of transit property as would other municipal police forces.

When TransLink's official name was changed to the South Coast British Columbia Transportation Authority in 2007 to recognize the potential for future service expansion outside of Greater Vancouver, MVTP followed and changed its name as well. However, references to GVTAPS will continue to have legal effect as if they were references to SCBCTAPS.

The MVTP, along with other BC police forces including the RCMP, seconds officers to the Combined Forces Special Enforcement Unit of British Columbia.

== History ==
The first persons employed for protection of mass transit in Vancouver were the night watchmen of the BC Electric Railway, established 1897. As the system grew, the company used the provisions of the provincial Railway Act to employ Special Constables. During the Great War, several special constables were posted to key infrastructure to protect against sabotage. After the war's end, these constables were appointed less frequently, leaving watchmen to protect the system.

During World War II, an armed special constabulary was established - again intended to protect against sabotage - named the Special Protection Force. After victory in Japan, they were disbanded. The company began transitioning the watchmen to security officers, and those security officers would remain as the company was nationalized and became BC Hydro. As BC Transit was created, the security officers responsible for transit became employed by them.

Former TransLink SPCs Shoulder Patch

At the opening of the first SkyTrain line in December 1985, 15 Special Provincial Constables (SPCs) were appointed to BC Transit Security. SPCs did not carry firearms, but did carry pepper spray and batons. As the transit system grew, so did the scope and responsibility of these peace officers. In 1999, as the responsibility of transit and transportation on the south coast of British Columbia was reassigned to TransLink (Greater Vancouver Transportation Authority), they became the SPCs new employers.

Initially, the SPCs contacted the Vancouver Police Department and, later, the New Westminster Police Department when they needed to query persons and vehicles. As their needs grew, they earned their own access to police databases and records, getting the attention of the provincial government. The BC government recognized that the SPCs were never initially meant to enforce drug laws or enter into criminal investigations but saw the need for same. SPCs did not have authority to enforce drug laws under the Controlled Drugs and Substances Act (Police Enforcement) Regulation. The police services division of the government re-iterated that the SPCs authority was limited to transit property, and they could not stop suspects fleeing from a separate crime scene or intervene in incidents occurring just outside SkyTrain stations.

In 2003, the BC Association of Chiefs of Police supported TransLink's application to have a Designated Policing Unit under the newly created section of the Police Act. Over the next couple of years, the necessary processes took place, and the MVTP became operational in December 2005. Many of the SPCs stayed on, after completing the full training at the Police Academy at the Justice Institute of British Columbia to become full constables.

In November 2007, the Greater Vancouver Transportation Authority was renamed the "South Coast British Columbia Transportation Authority" pursuant to the Greater Vancouver Transportation Authority Amendment Act 2007, and the police force followed suit.

In 2023, MVTP formed a community safety officer (CSO) program. The CSOs are not police officers but have similar powers and functions that TransLink's special provincial constables had prior to 2005.

== Organization ==
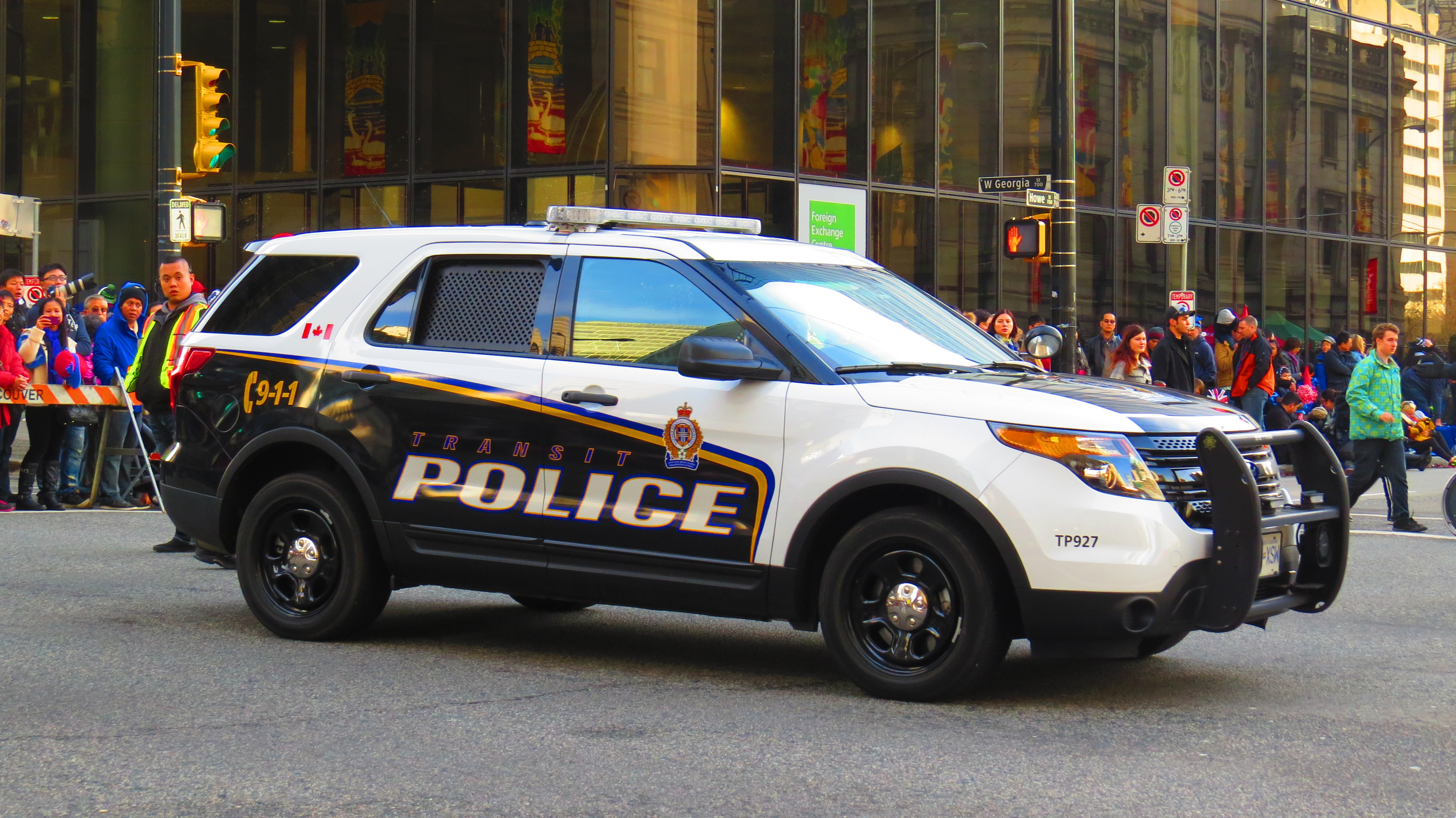
MVTP vehicle (2014)

The MVTP report to the South Coast British Columbia Transportation Authority Police Board (SCBCTA Police Board). The police board is responsible for the governance and oversight of the SCBCTAPS. The board is responsible for appointing officers, including the chief officer and deputy chief officer, approving finances and the budget, and establishing policy. Unlike other BC municipal police forces, the SCBCTA Police Board only has appointed members and does not have any democratically elected member (whereas mayors in other police boards act as the chair).

Their numbers have remained steady since 2010, at 167 sworn officers. The most senior officer is Suzanne Muir, who became the chief officer on October 1, 2023.

=== Community Partnerships ===
Inter-Regional at Risk Youth Link (IRAYL) - The MVTP has been working in close partnership with IRAYL since 2008. IRAYL is a unique partnership/youth outreach program that provides support and resources to marginalized youth, founded in part by a MVTP officer, formerly a youth worker. The team comprises experienced youth workers who work in and around SkyTrain and Canada Line stations to provide youth with access to much needed services, like shelters, social services, food banks, counselling, recreation and youth centers, as part of a cross-regional crime reduction initiative.

In 2012, IRAYL – in conjunction with the MVTP and the Ministry of Children and Family Development – was awarded the Premier’s Innovation & Excellence Awards Program.

Collingwood Community Policing Centre – MVTP entered into an agreement with Collingwood Community Policing Centre, a Vancouver Police Department CPC, to serve in public outreach and education for the MVTP.

Surrey Crime Prevention Society - In 2015, MVTP began a partnership with Surrey Crime Prevention Society called Transit Watch where volunteers proactively patrol transit hubs in the city of Surrey, BC.

Hollaback! Vancouver - Also in 2015, as part of efforts to reduce sexual offences onboard transit, MVTP and Hollaback! Vancouver began an online awareness campaign.

== Controversy ==
As the only transit police force in Canada, there was concern by transit employee unions and interest groups when the decision to arm members was made. The province and BC Association of Chiefs of Police agreed that their designation as police would require the issuance of firearms.

News reports in April 2008 alleged the misuse of Tasers by MVTP members. It was reported that officers used the Tasers on offenders for the mispayment of transit fares. A 2010 inquiry found that the incidents of taser usage by the MVTP were legally justified, given the offenders were actively resisting or assaultive toward police during an investigation.

Since the early 2010s, arguments have been made that the MVTP are not an effective use of TransLink's funding or of police resources, as one of the primary duties of MVTP officers is checking transit fares and issuing tickets. Debates have included whether a different policing model would be more effective.

== See also ==
- Combined Forces Special Enforcement Unit of British Columbia
- E-Comm
- Transportation in Vancouver
- British Transport Police
