= Combined Forces Special Enforcement Unit – British Columbia =

RCMP special forces unit

Combined Forces Special Enforcement Unit - British Columbia
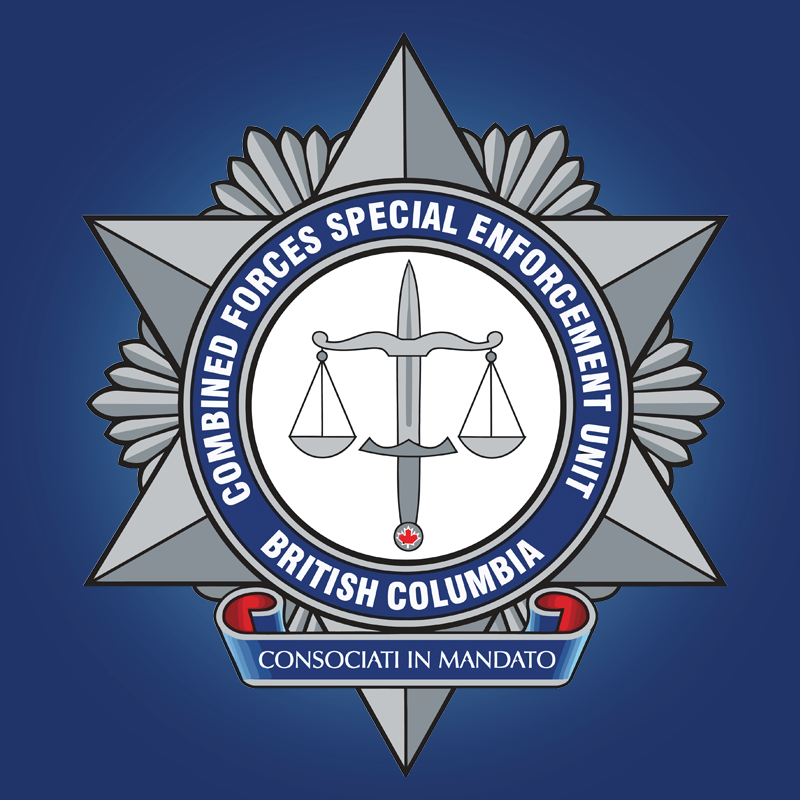
- CFSEU-BC logo
- Abbreviation: CFSEU-BC
- Motto: Consociati In Mandato; Allied in Mandate

Agency overview
- Formed: April 1, 2004
- Employees: 400

Jurisdictional structure
- Operations jurisdiction: British Columbia, Canada
- Constituting instrument: BC Police Act
- General nature: Civilian police

Operational structure
- Headquarters: Metro Vancouver
- Elected officer responsible: The Honourable Mike Farnworth, Minister of Public Safety and Solicitor General of British Columbia
- Agency executive: Assistant Commissioner Manny Mann (RCMP), Chief Officer - CFSEU
- Parent agency: RCMP "E" Division

Website
- http://cfseu.bc.ca/

The Combined Forces Special Enforcement Unit – British Columbia (CFSEU-BC) is a part of the Royal Canadian Mounted Police (RCMP) "E" Division, is an anti-gang unit mandated to provide support and investigation into complex and diverse criminal activities in British Columbia.

CFSEU-BC is tasked to expose, investigate, prosecute, dismantle, and disrupt organized criminal enterprises. The second mandate is to share intelligence with partners and to cooperate with, and assist other organized crime enforcement units at the national and international levels.

== History ==
It was established in 2004 to facilitate the disruption and suppression of organized crime in BC and to support municipal police departments when public safety is deemed to be a priority.

CFSEU-BC had undergone undercover operations, seized firearms, illegal drugs, cash and provided support in the rescue of Graham McMynn, son of businessman Robert McMynn.

In June 2026, the unit was involved in anti-drug investigations on a group that operated throughout BC.

== Organization ==
The CFSEU-BC is modelled after other CFSEU units across the country and is currently staffed by RCMP officers and seconded officers from all 12 municipal police forces in British Columbia and Metro Vancouver Transit Police.

The Minister of Public Safety and Solicitor General is in charge of the unit.
