= List of police firearms in Canada =

The following is a list of firearms used by police forces in Canada. The vast majority of firearms used by Canadian police are semi-automatic.

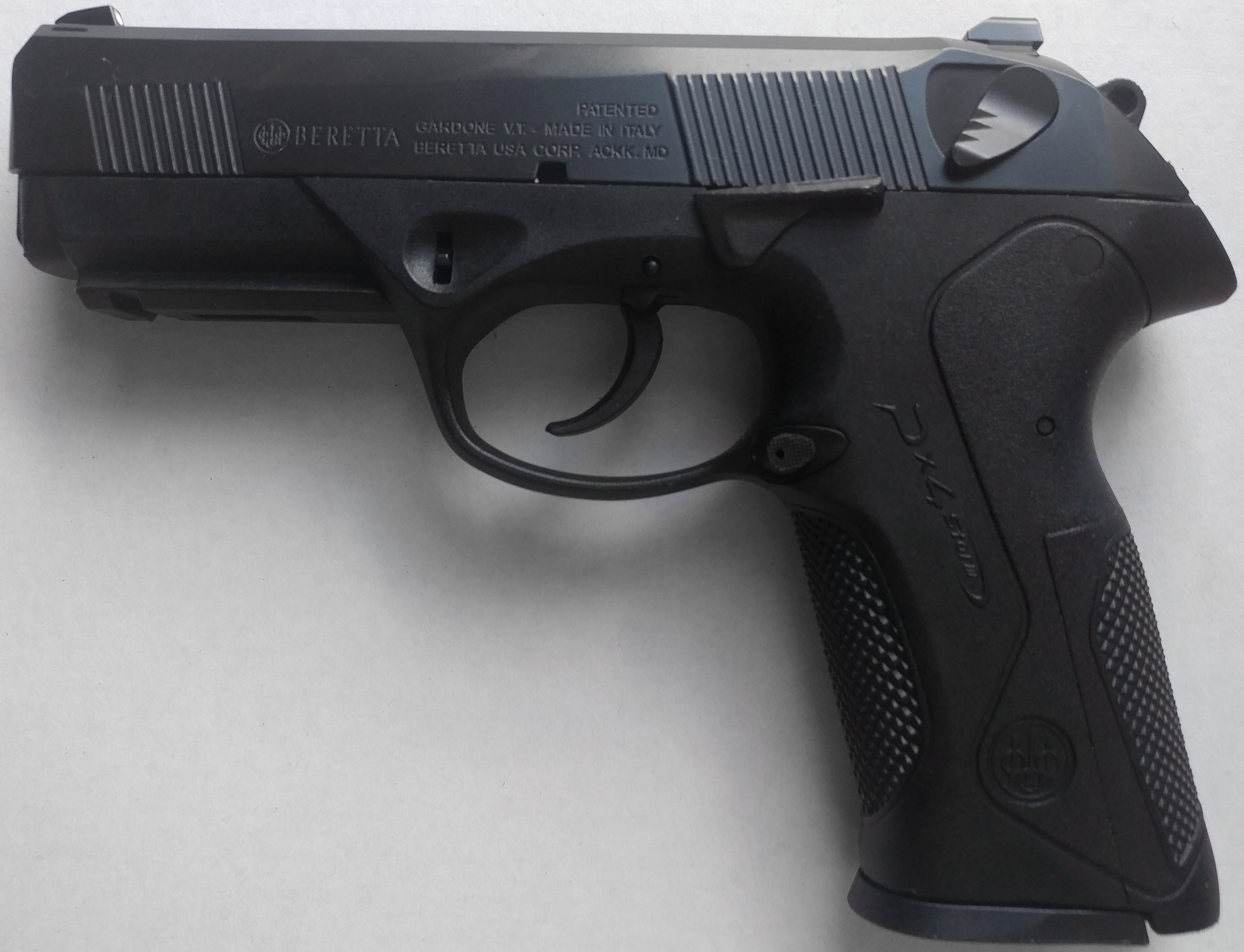
Beretta Px4 Storm

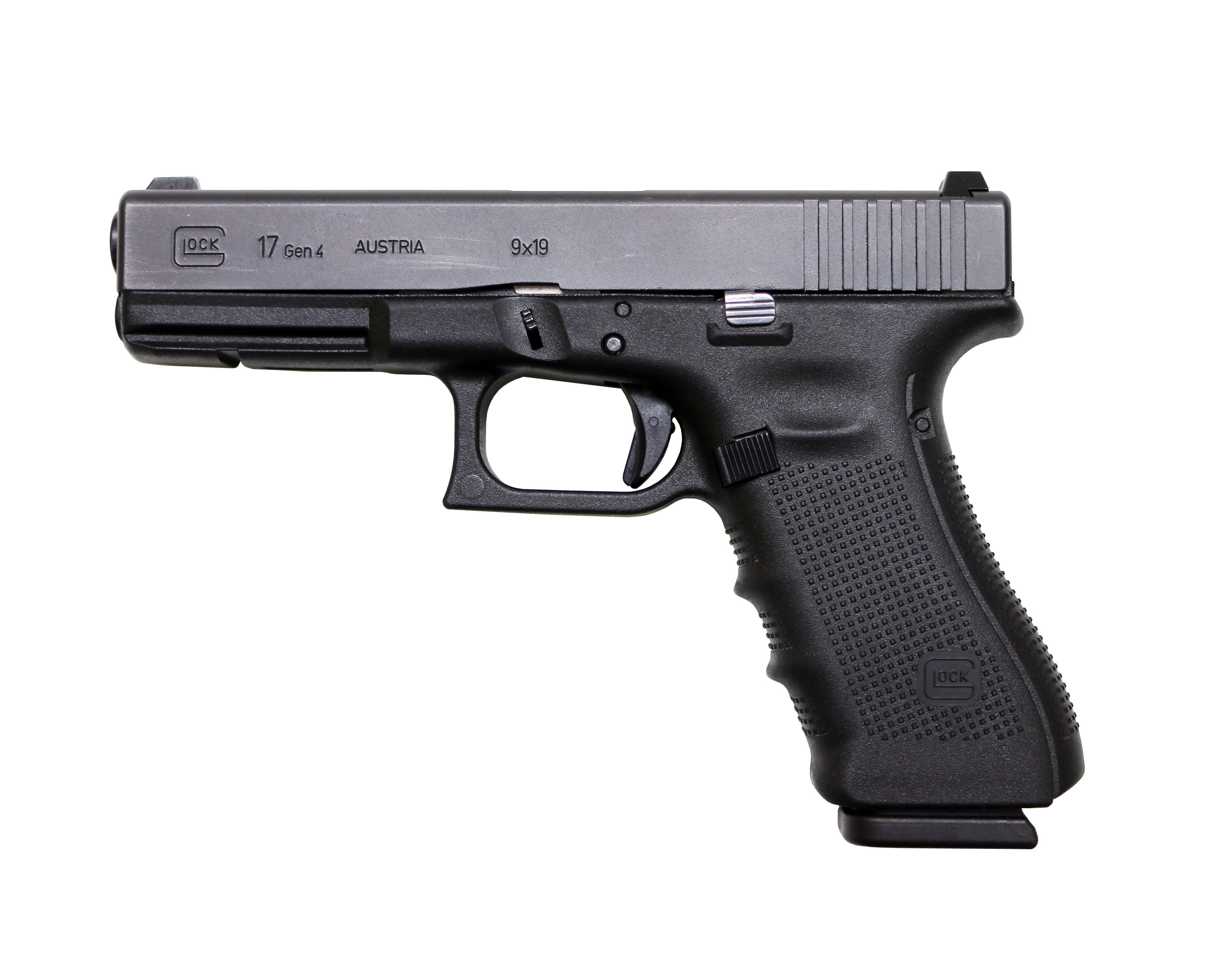
Glock 17 Gen4 pistol

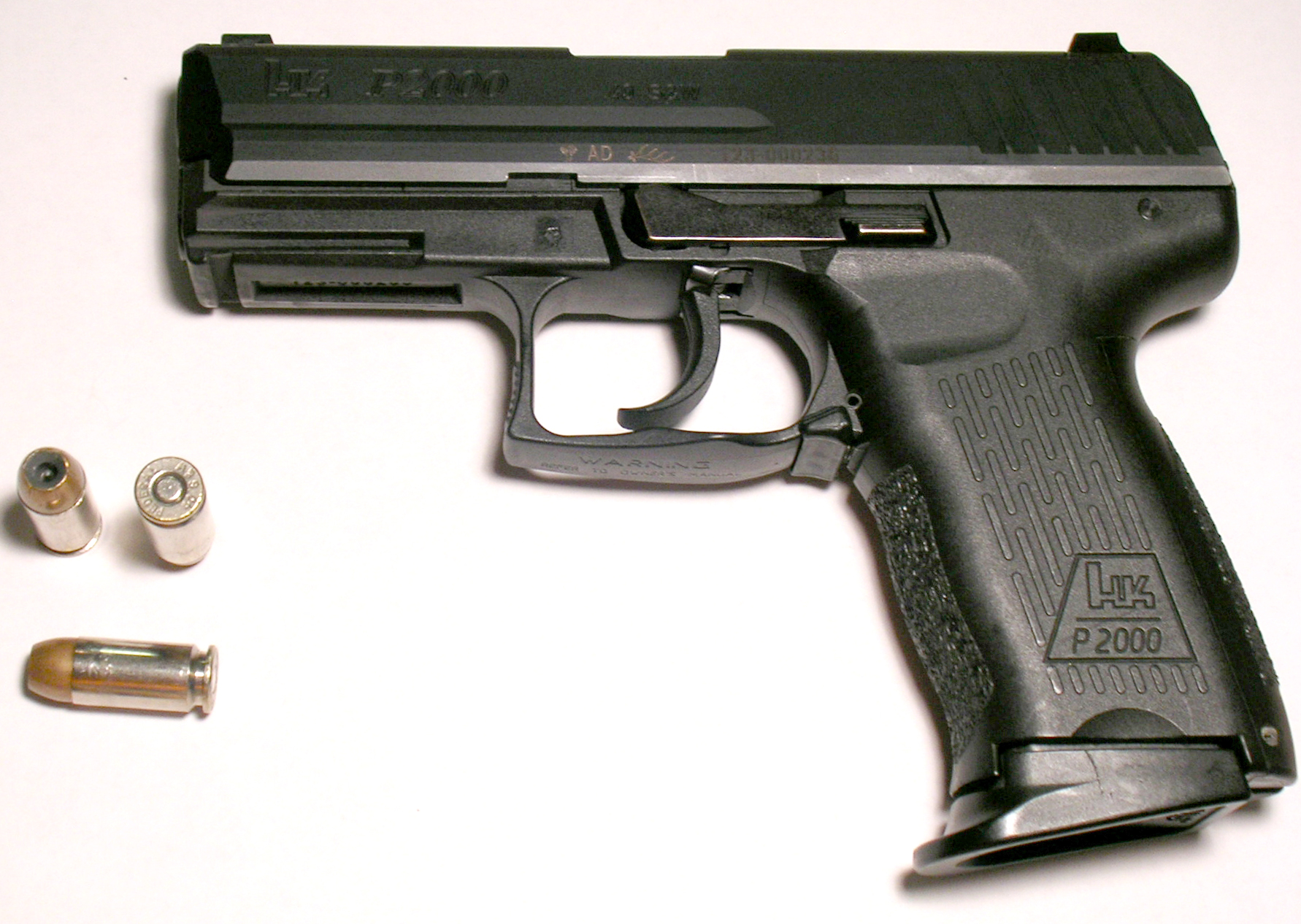
Heckler & Koch P2000

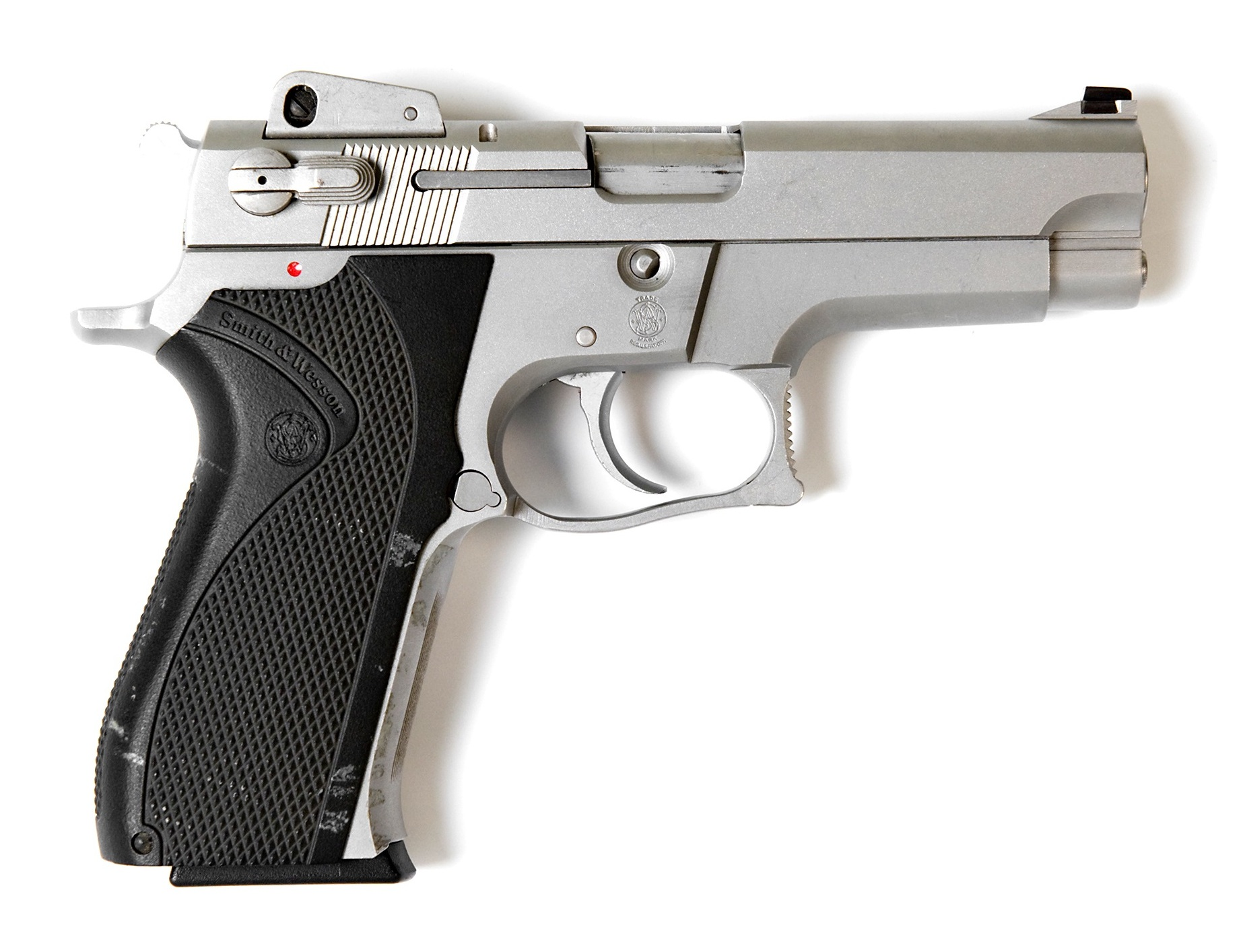
Smith & Wesson Model 5906

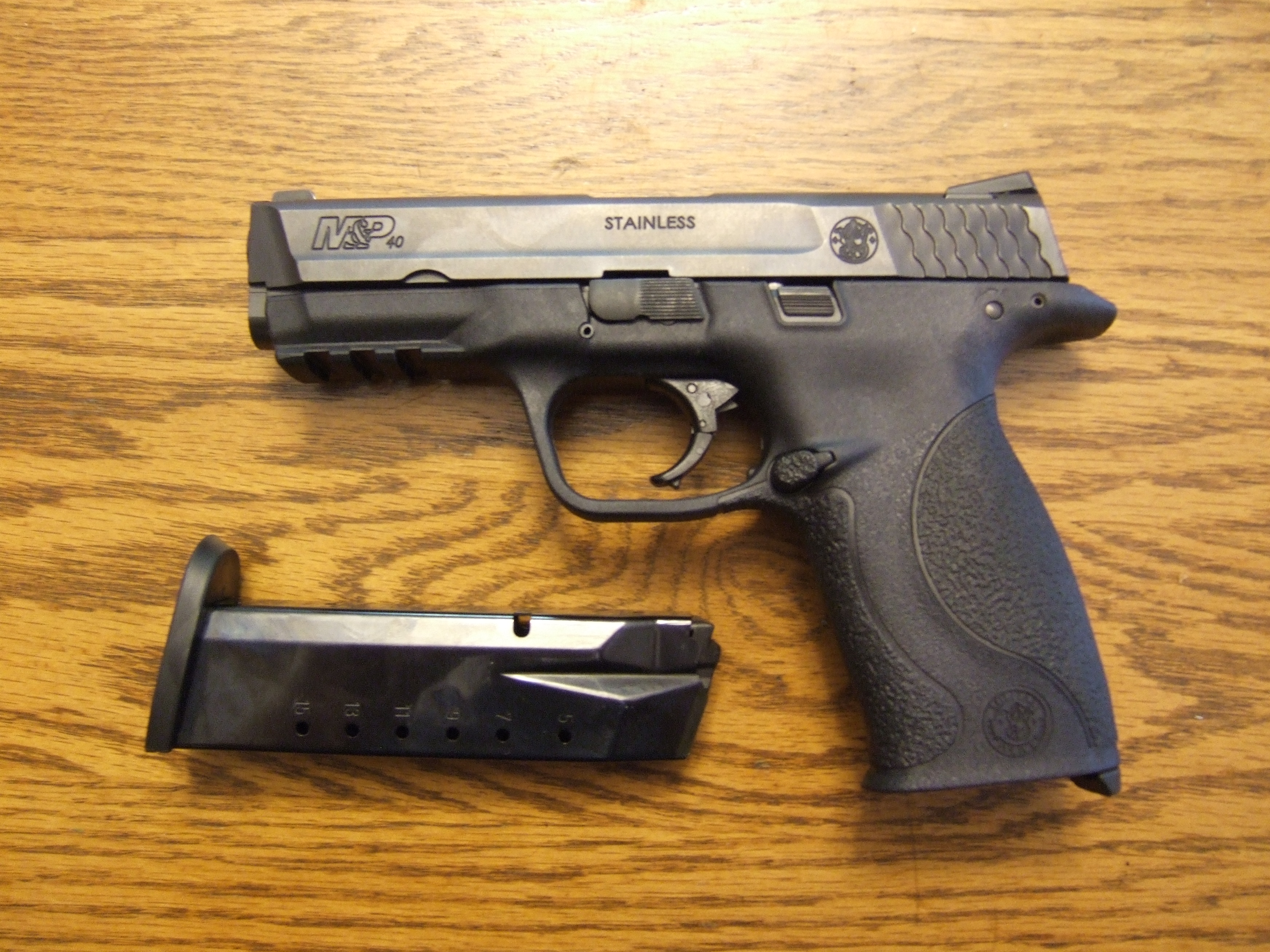
Smith & Wesson M&P

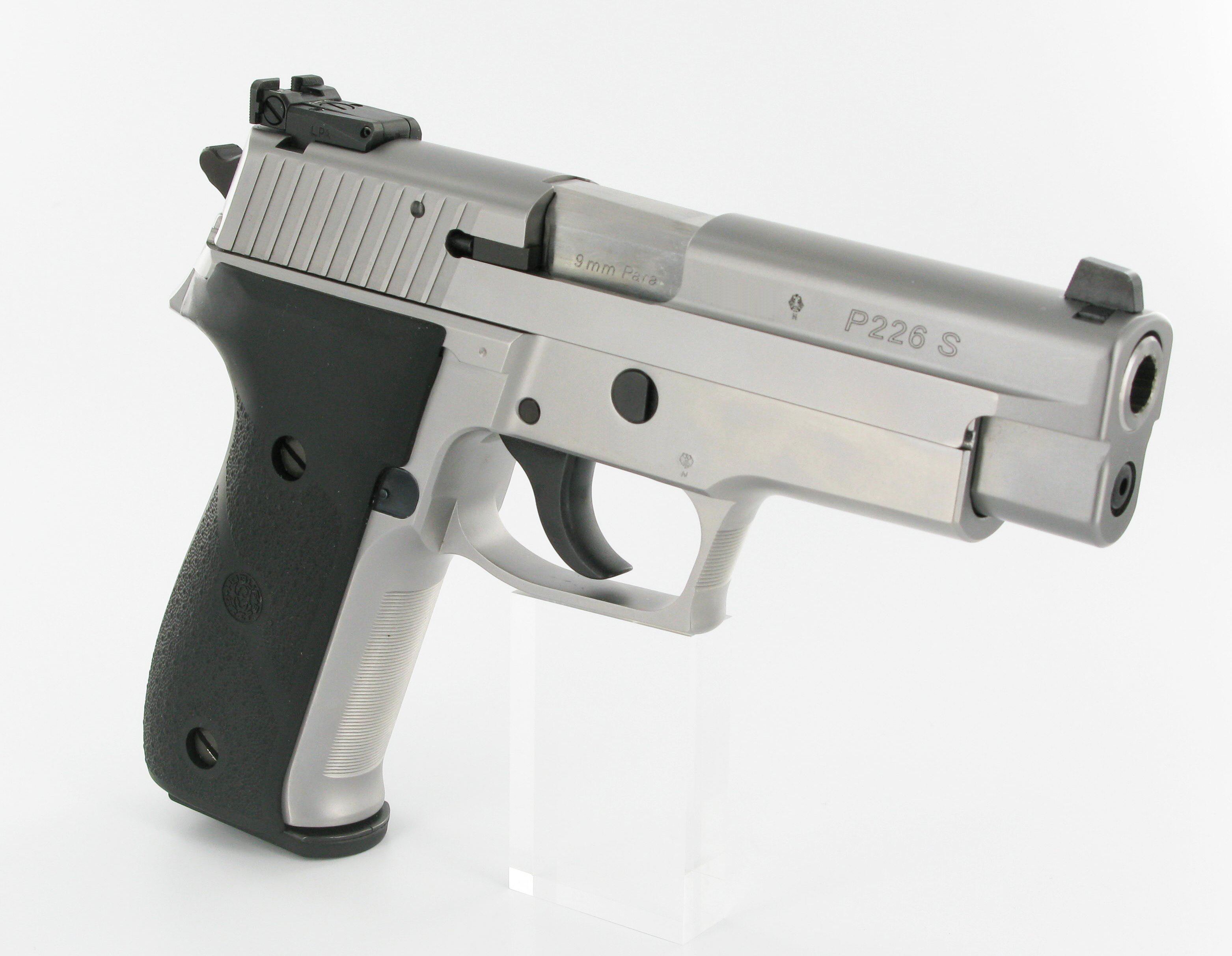
SIG Sauer P226

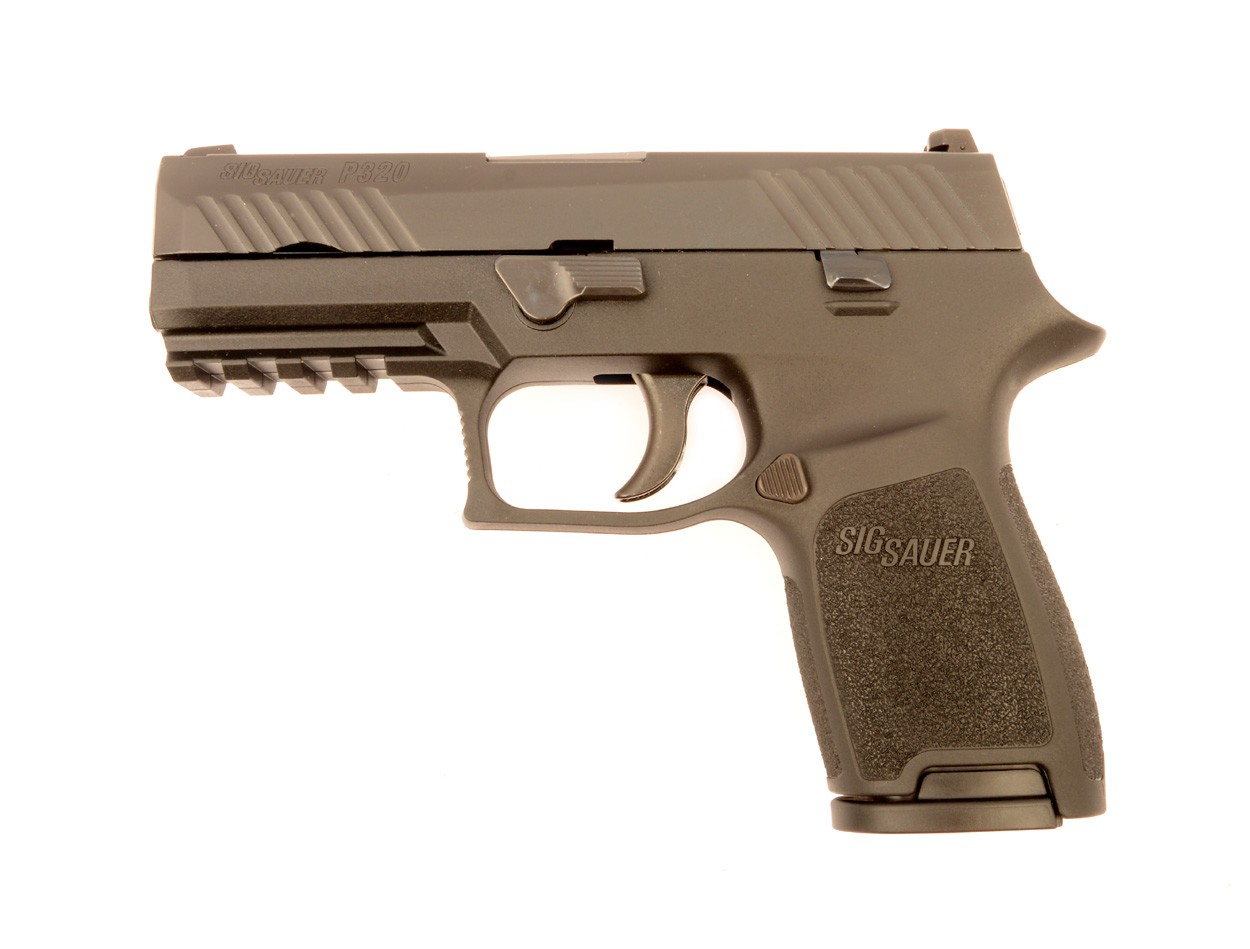
SIG Sauer P320

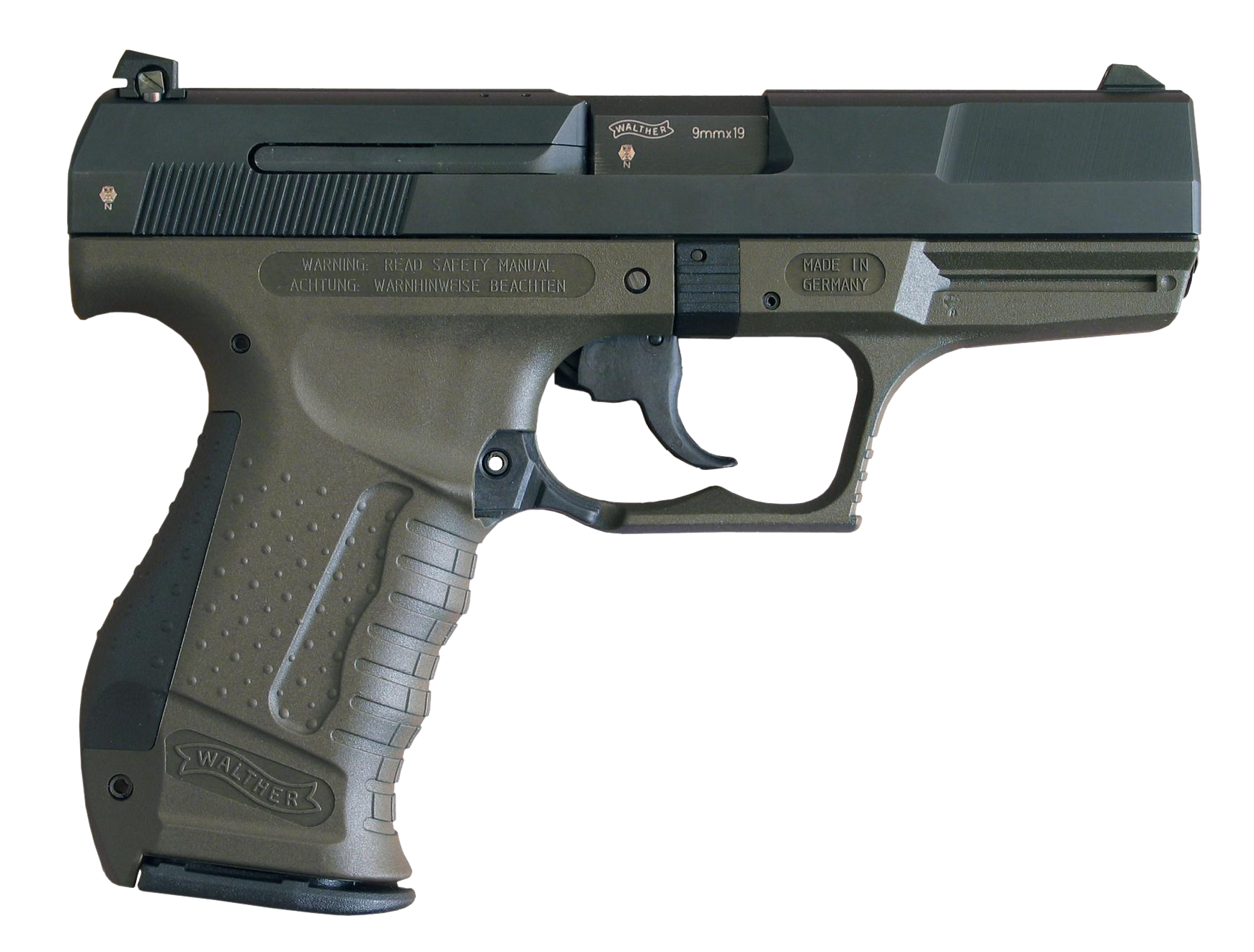
Walther P99

== Federal Police ==
| Service | Model | Calibre | type | Action | Origin | Details | Reference |
|---|---|---|---|---|---|---|---|
| Royal Canadian Mounted Police | Glock 45 MOS | 9×19mm Parabellum | Semi-automatic pistol | SFA | Austria | Standard issue sidearm | |
| Canadian Forces Military Police | SIG Sauer P320 (C24) | 9×19mm Parabellum | Semi-automatic pistol | DAO | USA | Standard issue sidearm | |
| Canada Border Services Agency | Beretta Px4 Storm | 9×19mm Parabellum | Semi-automatic pistol | DAO | Italy | Standard issue sidearm | |
| Correctional Service of Canada | Heckler & Koch P2000 | 9×19mm Parabellum | Semi-automatic pistol | DAO | Germany | Standard issue sidearm | |
| Parks Canada Warden Service | Heckler & Koch P2000 | 9×19mm Parabellum | Semi-automatic pistol | DAO | Germany | Standard issue sidearm | |
| Parliamentary Protective Service | SIG Sauer P226 | 9×19mm Parabellum | Semi-automatic pistol | DA/SA | West Germany | Standard issue sidearm | |
| Environment and Climate Change Canada | Glock 17 | 9×19mm Parabellum | Semi-automatic pistol | SFA | Austria | Standard issue sidearm | |
| Fisheries and Oceans | Glock 45 MOS | 9×19mm Parabellum | Semi-automatic pistol | SFA | Austria | Standard issue sidearm | |

== Provincial Police ==
| Service | Province | Model | Calibre | type | Action | Origin | Details | Reference |
|---|---|---|---|---|---|---|---|---|
| Ontario Provincial Police | Ontario | Glock 17M | 9×19mm Parabellum | Semi-automatic pistol | SFA | Austria | Standard issue sidearm | |
| Royal Newfoundland Constabulary | (Newfoundland and Labrador) Newfoundland & Labrador | SIG Sauer P226 | .40 S&W | Semi-automatic pistol | DAK | West Germany | Standard issue sidearm | |
| Sûreté du Québec | Quebec | Glock 17 | 9×19mm Parabellum | Semi-automatic pistol | SFA | Austria | Standard issue sidearm | |
| Direction de la sécurité dans les palais de justice | Quebec | Glock 17 | 9×19mm Parabellum | Semi-automatic pistol | SFA | Austria | Standard issue sidearm | |
| Contrôle routier Québec | Quebec | Glock 17 | 9×19mm Parabellum | Semi-automatic pistol | SFA | Austria | Standard issue sidearm | |
| Alberta Sheriffs Branch | Alberta | Glock 17 | 9x19mm Parabellum | Semi-automatic pistol | SFA | Austria | Standard issue sidearm | |
| Saskatchewan Marshals Service | Saskatchewan | Glock 45 MOS | 9x19mm Parabellum | Semi-Automatic pistol | SFA | Austria | Standard Issue Sidearm | |

== Regional and Municipal Police ==
| Service | Province | Model | Calibre | type | Origin | Details | Reference |
|---|---|---|---|---|---|---|---|
| Abbotsford Police Department | British Columbia | Glock 17M | 9×19mm Parabellum | Semi-automatic pistol | Austria | Standard issue sidearm | |
| Barrie Police Service | Ontario | Glock 17 | 9×19mm Parabellum | Semi-automatic pistol | Austria | Standard issue sidearm | |
| Brockville Police Service | Ontario | Glock 17M | 9×19mm Parabellum | Semi-automatic pistol | Austria | Standard issue sidearm | |
| Calgary Police Service | Alberta | Glock 17 | 9×19mm Parabellum | Semi-automatic pistol | Austria | Standard issue sidearm | |
| Camrose Police Service | Alberta | Glock 17 | 9×19mm Parabellum | Semi-automatic pistol | Austria | Standard issue sidearm | |
| Central Saanich Police Service | British Columbia | Glock 17M | 9×19mm Parabellum | Semi-automatic pistol | Austria | Standard issue sidearm | |
| Cobourg Police Service | Ontario | Glock 17 Gen 5 | 9×19mm Parabellum | Semi-automatic pistol | Austria | Standard issue sidearm | |
| Charlottetown Police Service | (Prince Edward Island) PEI | SIG Sauer P320 | 9×19mm Parabellum | Semi-automatic pistol | Italy | Standard issue sidearm | |
| Delta Police Department | British Columbia | Glock 17M | 9×19mm Parabellum | Semi-automatic pistol | Austria | Standard issue sidearm | |
| Durham Regional Police Service | Ontario | Glock 17 | 9×19mm Parabellum | Semi-automatic pistol | Austria | Standard issue sidearm | |
| Edmonton Police Service | Alberta | Glock 17 Gen 5 | 9x19mm Parabellum | Semi-automatic pistol | Austria | Standard issue sidearm | |
| Fredericton Police | New Brunswick | SIG Sauer P226 | 9×19mm Parabellum | Semi-automatic pistol | West Germany | Standard issue sidearm | |
| Greater Sudbury Police Service | Ontario | SIG Sauer P320 | 9×19mm Parabellum | Semi-automatic pistol | USA | Standard issue sidearm | |
| Guelph Police Service | Ontario | SIG Sauer P226 | 9×19mm Parabellum | Semi-automatic pistol | West Germany | Standard issue sidearm | |
| Halifax Regional Police | Nova Scotia | SIG Sauer P226 | 9×19mm Parabellum | Semi-automatic pistol | West Germany | Standard issue sidearm | |
| Halton Regional Police Service | Ontario | Smith & Wesson M&P | .40 S&W | Semi-automatic pistol | USA | Standard issue sidearm | |
| Hamilton Police Service | Ontario | Glock 17 | 9×19mm Parabellum | Semi-automatic pistol | Austria | Standard issue sidearm | |
| Kingston Police | Ontario | Glock 17 | 9×19mm Parabellum | Semi-automatic pistol | Austria | Standard issue sidearm | |
| Lacombe Police Service | Alberta | SIG Sauer P226 | 9×19mm Parabellum | Semi-automatic pistol | West Germany | Standard issue sidearm | |
| Lethbridge Police Service | Alberta | Glock 17 | 9x19mm Parabellum | Semi-automatic pistol | Austria | Standard issue sidearm | |
| London Police Service | Ontario | Glock 17; Glock 22 | 9×19mm Parabellum.40 S&W | Semi-automatic pistol | Austria | Standard issue sidearm | |
| Medicine Hat Police Service | Alberta | Glock 17 | 9×19mm Parabellum | Semi-automatic pistol | Austria | Standard issue sidearm | |
| Nelson Police Department | British Columbia | Glock 17M | 9×19mm Parabellum | Semi-automatic pistol | Austria | Standard issue sidearm | |
| New Westminster Police Department | British Columbia | Glock 17 | 9×19mm Parabellum | Semi-automatic pistol | Austria | Standard issue sidearm | |
| Niagara Regional Police Service | Ontario | Glock 22 | .40 S&W | Semi-automatic pistol | Austria | Standard issue sidearm | |
| North Bay Police Service | Ontario | Glock 22 | .40 S&W | Semi-automatic pistol | Austria | Standard issue sidearm | |
| Ottawa Police Service | Ontario | Glock 17 | 9×19mm Parabellum | Semi-automatic pistol | Austria | Standard issue sidearm | |
| Peel Regional Police | Ontario | SIG Sauer P320 | 9x19 Parabellum | Semi-automatic pistol | USA | Standard issue sidearm | |
| Port Moody Police Department | British Columbia | Glock 45 MOS | 9×19mm Parabellum | Semi-automatic pistol | Austria | Standard issue sidearm | |
| Regina Police Service | Saskatchewan | Glock 22 | .40 S&W | Semi-automatic pistol | Austria | Standard issue sidearm | |
| Kennebecasis Regional Police Force | New Brunswick | SIG Sauer P226 | 9×19mm Parabellum | Semi-automatic pistol | West Germany | Standard issue sidearm | |
| Saanich Police Department | British Columbia | Glock 17 | 9×19mm Parabellum | Semi-automatic pistol | Austria | Standard issue sidearm | |
| Saskatoon Police Service | Saskatchewan | Glock 22 | .40 S&W | Semi-automatic pistol | Austria | Standard issue sidearm | |
| Service de police de la Ville de Gatineau | Quebec | Smith & Wesson M&P | .40 S&W | Semi-automatic pistol | USA | Standard issue sidearm | |
| Service de police de la Ville de Laval | Quebec | Glock 17 | 9×19mm Parabellum | Semi-automatic pistol | Austria | Standard issue sidearm | |
| Service de police de Longueuil | Quebec | Glock 45 | 9×19mm Parabellum | Semi-automatic pistol | Austria | Standard issue sidearm | |
| Service de police de la Ville de Montréal | Quebec | Glock 19 | 9×19mm Parabellum | Semi-automatic pistol | Austria | Standard issue sidearm | |
| Service de police de la Ville de Québec | Quebec | Walther P99 | 9×19mm Parabellum | Semi-automatic pistol | Germany | Standard issue sidearm | |
| Saugeen Shores Police Service | Ontario | Glock 17; Glock 26 | 9×19mm Parabellum | Semi-automatic pistol | Austria | Standard issue sidearm | |
| South Simcoe Police Service | Ontario | SIG Sauer P320 | 9×19mm Parabellum | Semi-automatic pistol | Austria | Standard issue sidearm | |
| Summerside Police Department | (Prince Edward Island) PEI | SIG Sauer P226 | 9×19mm Parabellum | Semi-automatic pistol | West Germany | Standard issue sidearm | |
| Surrey Police Service | British Columbia | Glock 17; Glock 26 | 9×19mm Parabellum | Semi-automatic pistol | Austria | Standard issue sidearm | |
| Taber Police Service | Alberta | SIG Sauer P320 | 9×19mm Parabellum | Semi-automatic pistol | USA | Standard issue sidearm | |
| Thunder Bay Police Service | Ontario | Glock 17; Glock 26 | 9×19mm Parabellum | Semi-automatic pistol | Austria | Standard issue sidearm | |
| Toronto Police Service | Ontario | Glock 17; Glock 19; Glock 22; Glock 27 | 9×19mm Parabellum; 9×19mm Parabellum.40 S&W.40 S&W | Semi-automatic pistol | Austria | Regular uniformed officers Detectives; Emergency Task Force | |
| Vancouver Police Department | British Columbia | SIG Sauer P320 | 9×19mm Parabellum | Semi-automatic pistol | West Germany | Standard issue sidearm | |
| Victoria Police Department | British Columbia | Glock 17 | 9×19mm Parabellum | Semi-automatic pistol | Austria | Standard issue sidearm | |
| Waterloo Regional Police Service | Ontario | Glock 45 | 9×19mm Parabellum | Semi-automatic pistol | Austria | Standard issue sidearm | |
| West Grey Police | Ontario | SIG Sauer P320 | 9×19mm Parabellum | Semi-automatic pistol | Germany | Standard issue sidearm | |
| West Vancouver Police Department | British Columbia | Glock 22 | .40 S&W | Semi-automatic pistol | Austria | Standard issue sidearm | |
| Windsor Police Service | Ontario | Glock 45 | 9×19mm Parabellum | Semi-automatic pistol | Austria | Standard issue sidearm | |
| Winnipeg Police Service | Manitoba | Glock 22; Glock 35 | .40 S&W | Semi-automatic pistol | Austria | Standard issue sidearm Tactical Support Unit issue sidearm | |
| York Regional Police | Ontario | Glock 45 | 9×19mm Parabellum | Semi-automatic pistol | Austria | Standard issue sidearm | |

== Railway Police ==
| Service | Railway | Model | Calibre | type | Origin | Details | Reference |
|---|---|---|---|---|---|---|---|
| CN Police | Canadian National | Glock 17M | 9×19mm Parabellum | Semi-automatic pistol | Austria | Standard issue sidearm | |
| Canadian Pacific Kansas City Police Service | Canadian Pacific Kansas City | Glock 17 | 9×19mm Parabellum | Semi-automatic pistol | Austria | Standard issue sidearm | |
| Via Rail Police | Via Rail | | | | | | |

== Defunct Police ==
| Service | Locale | Type | Years | Model | Calibre | type | Origin | Details | Reference |
|---|---|---|---|---|---|---|---|---|---|
| Alberta Provincial Police | Alberta | Provincial | 1917–1932 | Smith & Wesson Model 10 | .38 S&W Special | Service Revolver | USA | Standard issue sidearm | |
| British Columbia Provincial Police | British Columbia | Provincial | 1871–1950 | Smith & Wesson Heavy Duty | .38/44 S&W | Service Revolver | USA | | |
| Canadian Military Police Corps | Canada | Military | 1917–1920 | Colt M1911, Colt New Service, and S&W Hand Ejector 2nd Model | .45 ACP .455 Webley .455 Webley | Semi-automatic Revolver Revolver | USA | Several types of handguns issued | |
| Dominion Police | Canada | Federal | 1868–1920 | Enfield Mk II | .476 Enfield | Service Revolver | United Kingdom | | |
| New Brunswick Highway Patrol | New Brunswick | Provincial | 1978–1989 | | | | | | |
| Newfoundland Rangers | Newfoundland | Federal | 1935–1950 | Webley Mk VI | .455 Webley | Service Revolver | United Kingdom | Standard issue sidearm | |
| North-West Mounted Police | Canada | Federal | 1873–1920 | Colt New Service | .45 Colt | Service Revolver | USA | Standard issue sidearm | |
| Nova Scotia Police | Nova Scotia | Provincial | 1930–1932 | | | | | | |
| Ports Canada Police | Canada | Federal | 1983–1998 | | | | | | |
| Rivière-du-Nord Municipal Police | Quebec | Regional/Municipal | ?–2009 | SIG Sauer P226 | 9×19mm Parabellum | Semi-automatic pistol | West Germany | Standard issue sidearm | |
| Royal Canadian Air Force Police | Canada | Military | 1940–1968 | | | | | | |
| Saskatchewan Provincial Police | Saskatchewan | Provincial | 1917–1928 | | | | | | |
| Shelburne Police Service | Ontario | Regional/Municipal | 1879–2021 | Glock 17 | 9×19mm Parabellum | Semi-automatic pistol | Austria | Standard issue sidearm | |
