= Killing of Merhdad Bayrami =

2012 police shooting in New Westminster, Canada

On November 7, 2012, Merhdad Bayrami was shot and killed by Delta Police Constable Jordan MacWilliams after a five-hour standoff at the Starlight Casino in New Westminster, British Columbia after he took his ex-spouse Tetiana Piltsina hostage. Constable MacWilliams was controversially charged with second-degree murder in October 2014. By July 2015 those charges were dropped. It was the first time a police officer had been charged for using lethal force in British Columbia since 1975.

== Background to incident ==
In August 2012, Mehrdad Bayrami visited Dr. Manoj Singhal and complained of a sore arm. Dr. Singhal observed symptoms of depression, suicidal ideations, and sleep deprivation. Dr. Singhal then saw Bayrami regularly, up until two weeks before the shooting.

Tetiana Piltsina lived in Richmond, BC when she began to complain to the local RCMP about her ex-spouse Mehrdad Bayrami. She alleged Bayrami was following her, harassing her by telephone, damaging her property, and slandering her to her associates and friends. By October, Bayrami's actions were so concerning that police established surveillance on him and reached out to crown prosecutors. Bayrami was arrested after he placed a GPS tracker on Piltsina's vehicle, and the court process resulted in a peace bond prohibiting Bayrami from contacting Piltsina.

== Hostage-taking ==
At approximately 5:45 a.m. on November 8, 2012, Mehrdad Bayrami was waiting in a vehicle outside Starlight Casino - Tetiana Piltsina's workplace. Piltsina had just arrived in her car, and saw Bayrami wearing a reflective vest. Bayrami ran toward her, pulled out a gun, and pulled her into the car. Bayrami fired two shots in an attempt to control her.

It was after the shots were fired that 9-1-1 calls were placed to New Westminster Police (NWPD). Police responded and Piltsina remained confined by Bayrami in a stand-off with police. Bayrami held the gun to his own head during most of this time. The NWPD called out the Municipal Integrated Emergency Response Team (MIERT), of which they were a member agency. Piltsina remained in Bayrami's confinement until police convinced him to allow her to walk to safety at approximately 6:56 a.m.

Cst. Jordan MacWilliams was a member of the Delta Police Department with approximately five and half years experience as a police officer, and was a member of MIERT. He responded to the incident with the MIERT team. There were four teams of MIERT officers and at least 27 police officers total at the scene. MIERT was tasked with keeping a 20-metre perimeter around Bayrami, many of them - including Cst. MacWilliams - taking cover behind armoured vehicles. Cst. MacWilliams was assigned to "lethal overwatch" duty with a rifle.

Bayrami removed the magazine from his pistol at approximately 10:00 am, leaving one round in the chamber. After remaining seated for some time, he got up and started walking around in circles, moving the gun in directions away from himself but generally pointed at his own head or chest.

== Shooting ==
Captured on video, the shooting of Bayrami occurred at 10:40 a.m. From a standing position, he looks at and takes several steps forward toward Cst. MacWilliams' team with his handgun pointing skyward. As he stops, police fire non-lethal ARWEN rounds at him, knocking him two or three steps backward. A flash-bang is detonated as he takes larger steps back. His arm with the gun drops to 45 degrees upward, then down to the ground. Other officers testified that, at this moment they had their guns trained on Bayrami and moved their fingers to the trigger as they prepared to fire.

Two shots are heard, and Bayrami jerks to the right and grasps the side of his abdomen. He spins around and falls to the ground, dropping his gun. A police dog is released as Bayrami picks up his gun and points it at his head. The dog grabs Bayrami's leg and he releases the gun. MIERT members move in, handcuff Bayrami, and begin first aid. He is rushed to hospital but dies on November 18. Cst. MacWilliams had fired two shots at Bayrami - one striking him in the abdomen, and one missed.

== Investigation and charge ==
Almost immediately after the incident, the Independent Investigations Office (IIO) assumed jurisdiction over the investigation of police actions leading to Bayrami's death.

The IIO's chief civilian director, Richard Rosenthal, submitted a report to Crown counsel in July 2013, recommending charges. The Criminal Justice Branch sent the report back for more information. The IIO submitted further information in July and October, 2014. The Criminal Justice Branch went to the Deputy Attorney General requesting a direct indictment, and it was approved on October 9. On October 20, Crown prosecutors charged Cst. MacWilliams with second-degree murder.

By April 2015, Bayrami's daughter Nousha Mayrami filed a lawsuit against Cst. MacWilliams, alleging he shot Bayrami without justification as he was walking away from officers. That month, Piltsina went to the media to hail Cst. MacWilliams as her hero. She claimed she was not interviewed by police or the IIO, even after reaching out to them to provide a statement.

== Stay of proceedings ==
On July 14, 2015, the murder charge against MacWilliams was stayed. The Criminal Justice Branch stated "CJB has determined that the available evidence no longer satisfies its charge approval standard for the continued prosecution of Const. MacWilliams for any criminal offence. As a result, a stay of proceedings was directed in the case." They insisted that the decision was made based on review of available evidence, and not as a result of any pressure from the public. Delta Police Chief Neil Dubord said "Today, we feel an overwhelming sense of relief for Jordan MacWilliams, his family, the men and women of the Delta Police Department, and indeed all police officers across Canada ... The charges laid by direct indictment had the potential to deeply impact police across Canada, both operationally and psychologically."

As of January 2019, Constable MacWilliams is still employed with the Delta Police Department.
