= Municipal Integrated Emergency Response Team =

The Municipal Integrated Emergency Response Team (MIERT) was an emergency response unit formed as a joint venture of police agencies in the Lower Mainland of British Columbia, Canada. It was formed in 2006 and is composed of members of the Delta Police Department, the Abbotsford Police Department, the New Westminster Police Service, and the Port Moody Police Department. In 2013 the MIERT was disbanded and the Abbotsford Police Department formed its own Emergency Response Team. The remaining services have decided to either combine or contract their teams with the Vancouver Police Department (Delta Police Department, Port Moody Police Department) or contract with the Royal Canadian Mounted Police (New Westminster Police Service).

== See also ==
- List of law enforcement agencies in British Columbia
- Emergency management
- Emergency Response Team
