= Chief of police =

Title given to an appointed official

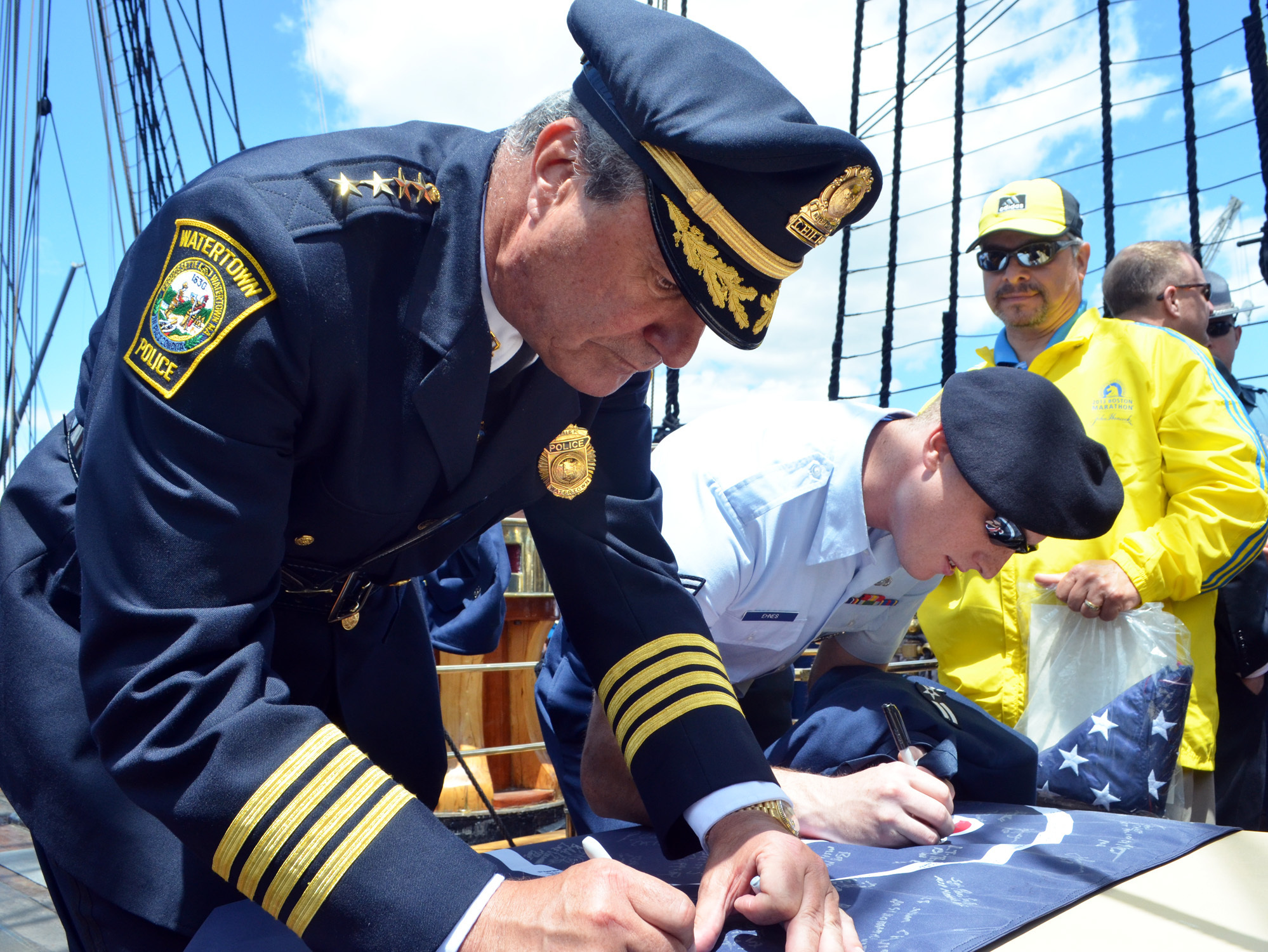
Edward Deveau, chief of the Watertown Police Department in Massachusetts, signing a flag aboard the USS Constitution in 2013

A chief of police (COP) is an appointed official or an elected one in the chain of command of a police department, particularly in North America. A chief of police may also be known as a police chief or sometimes just a chief, while some countries favour other titles such as commissioner or chief constable. A police chief is appointed by and answerable to a state or local government.

== Duties ==
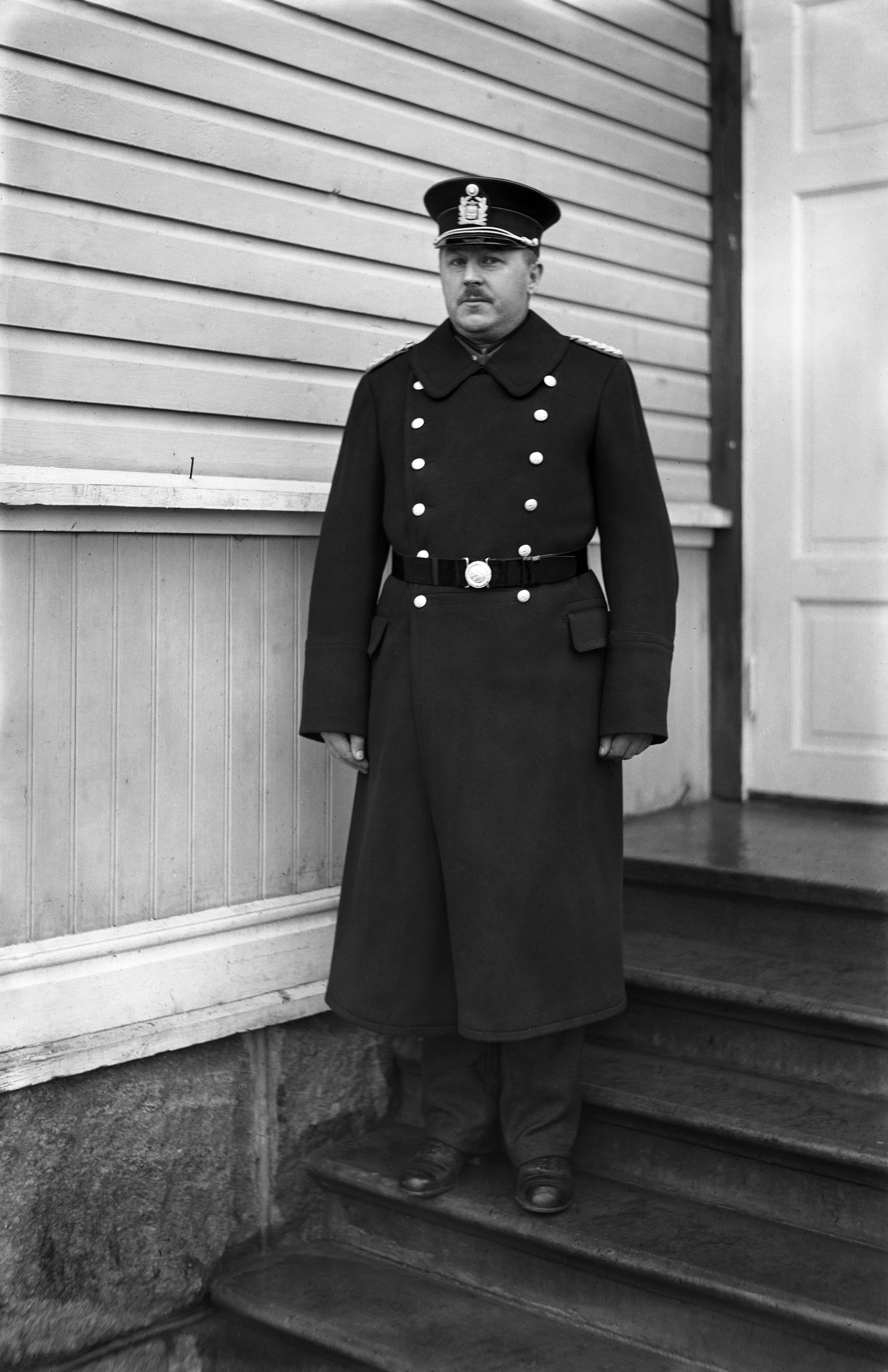
District police chief Frans Fagerholm on duty in Sipoo, Finland in 1929

The precise role of a chief of police varies by country and sometimes within a country. The larger a police force or department, the more likely that some duties will be delegated to mid-ranked officers. The following list is a general sense of the actions and responsibilities held by any chief of police.

- Oversight of a department's operations and budgeting
- Oversight of officers
  - Limited disciplinary actions to be addressed on infractions of policy, rules, regulations, laws or ordinances
  - Full dismissal or heavy sanctioning of officer duty; these powers vary by department
  - Promotion and rank placement of officers
- Production and development of department policies and regulations
- Liaison with the governments that oversee and fund the department
- In small police departments, upkeep and updating of department equipment such as police vehicles, weapons, communications equipment and uniforms
- In the smallest police departments, the chief may also carry out the same duties as regular officers (patrol, investigations, etc.)

Police chiefs are usually sworn police officers, and therefore wear police uniforms and have the power of arrest, though there are exceptions. In practice, their work is administrative in all but the smallest police departments. The rare occasions when police chiefs make arrests have drawn media coverage. In 2014, Bernard Hogan-Howe chased a group of fare evaders and made an arrest. A taxi driver had approached Hogan-Howe for help, unaware that he was London's police commissioner. In 2017, Los Angeles Police Department Chief Charlie Beck arrested a police officer on suspicion of a sexual offence.

== Canada ==
The title Chief of Police (French: directeur) is the most common title for the highest-ranked officer in a Canadian police service. The exceptions are the Royal Canadian Mounted Police (commissioner), the Canadian Forces Military Police (provost marshal), Ontario Provincial Police (commissioner), South Coast British Columbia Transportation Authority Police Service (chief officer), Vancouver Police Department (chief constable), West Vancouver Police Department (chief constable), Nelson Police Department (chief constable), Quebec City (director) and the Sûreté du Québec (director-general).

In the province of Ontario, a chief of police must be a sworn police officer and therefore have completed training at the Ontario Police College (OPC) or have served a probationary period with another recognized police force (such as the Royal Canadian Mounted Police's academy known as "Depot"). This requirement is legislated in the Police Services Act of Ontario. The legislation states in section two that a chief of police is a police officer. Section 44.2 of the PSA defines the training requirements. There was a case in the police department of Guelph, Ontario, where a human resource manager was promoted to the position of deputy chief but was required to complete training at the OPC. The candidate is selected by a police services board.

=== Deputy chief ===
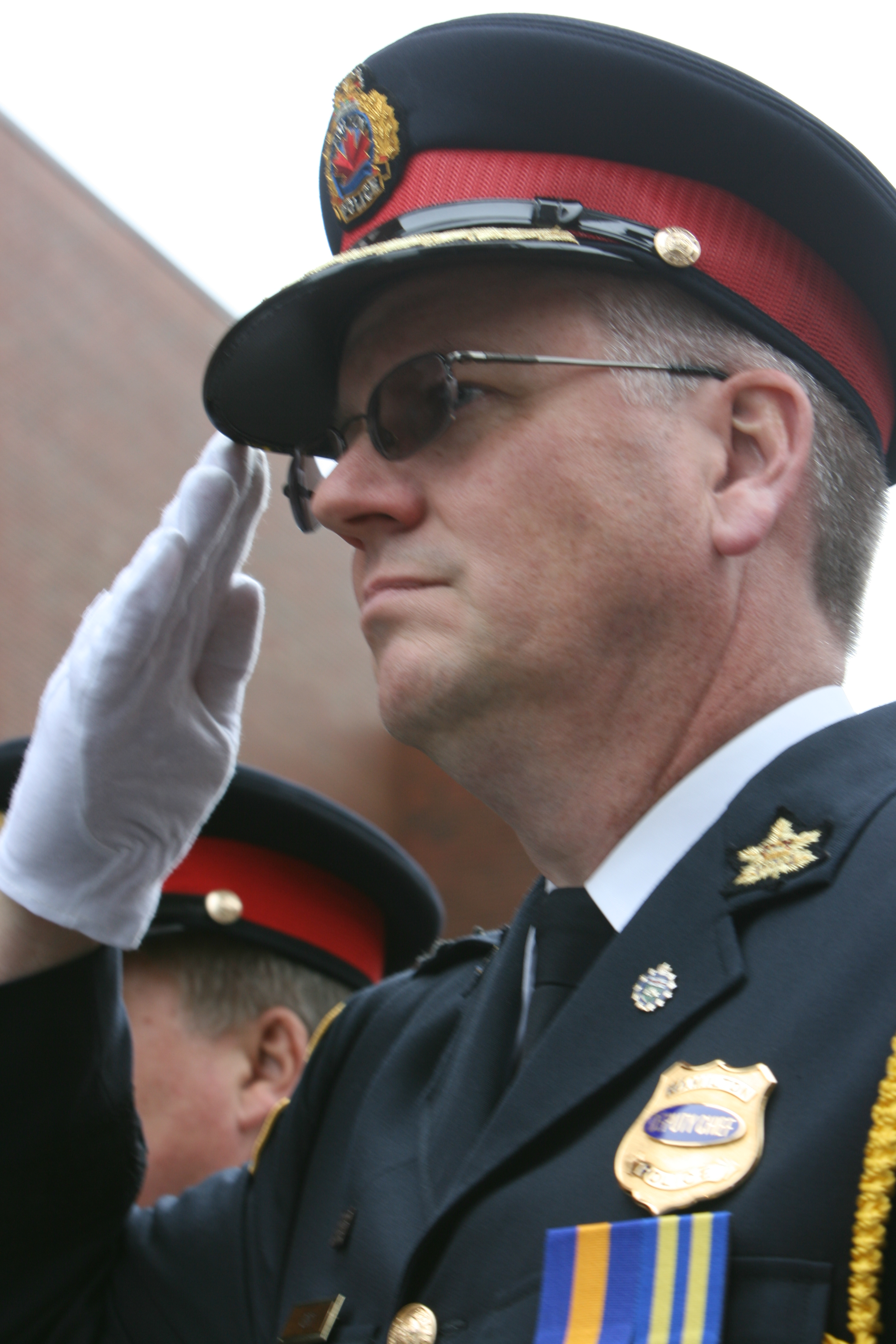
Eric Girth, deputy chief of the Hamilton Police Service, saluting in 2012

The title Deputy Chief of Police, or more commonly Deputy Chief, ranks at a level 9 in which is directly below the chief. Officers are stylized as deputy chief, deputy chief constable (in British Columbia) and deputy commissioner or associate director (in Quebec). They serve as the second-in-command within a police service and may be tasked with specific responsibilities.

== Germany ==
In Germany, the police are structured at the state level. As a result, every State Police Department has its Chief of Police, and the titles for these chiefs vary from one state to another.

== India ==
In India, the police are structured at the state level. As a result, every State Police Department has its Chief of Police, and the titles for these chiefs vary from one state to another. The most common title of a state police chief is Director General of Police (DGP), which is also the highest police rank in the state police forces. Multiple officers may hold the DGP rank, but only one serves as the Head of the Police Force (HoPF).

Most Indian state police departments generally has more than one officer with the rank of Director General (DG), because of which one of the officers with the rank of Director General is appointed to the position of the Director General of Police (Head of Police Force). In Kerala, the police chief is officially designated as the State Police Chief, while holding the DGP rank. The other common titles includes, Director General and Inspector General of Police (DG & IGP).

The chief of a municipal police/metropolitan police force holds the title of Commissioner of Police (CP).

== Indonesia ==
In Indonesia, the chief of the National Police of Indonesia is often colloquially dubbed: "Kapolri", an acronym of "Kepala Kepolisian Negara Republik Indonesia" meaning "Head of the National Police of the Republic of Indonesia".The National Police Chiefs are four-star ranking officers in the national police. The National Police Chief is appointed to the position by the President of Indonesia after the nomination of a candidate is approved in House of Representatives and is directly responsible to the president. Since Indonesia adopts the system of a unified "national police", the chief of the Indonesian National Police holds strong responsibility in policing authorities nationally across Indonesia. The police chief usually conducts strong relations and work together with the Commander of the National Armed Forces. In line with the general features of unified structure of local governments, all chiefs of the Indonesian police, at district level ("kapolsek", kepala kepolisian sektor"), municipal level ("kapolres", kepala kepolisian resor"), and provincial level ("kapolda", kepala kepolisian daerah) in Indonesia, are subordinates of Kapolri, the national police chief.

== Philippines ==
In the Philippines, the chief of police is the head of small city and municipal police.

== United Kingdom ==
In the United Kingdom, the chief police officer for 43 of the 45 territorial police forces and the three special police forces holds the rank of chief constable. The exceptions are the Metropolitan Police Service and City of London Police, where the chief police officer instead holds the rank of commissioner. The umbrella term for the chief constables and commissioners is "chief police officer". The term "chief officer", by contrast, includes the chief police officers and their deputies and assistants. The members of the National Police Chiefs' Council are all of chief officer rank, including police staff equivalents, but the organisation does not represent its members' interests; rather, the Chief Police Officers' Staff Association serves this purpose.

The rank of commissioner should not be confused with the police and crime commissioners. They are elected officials who oversee a police force and how its funds are spent, rather than being police officers.

== United States ==
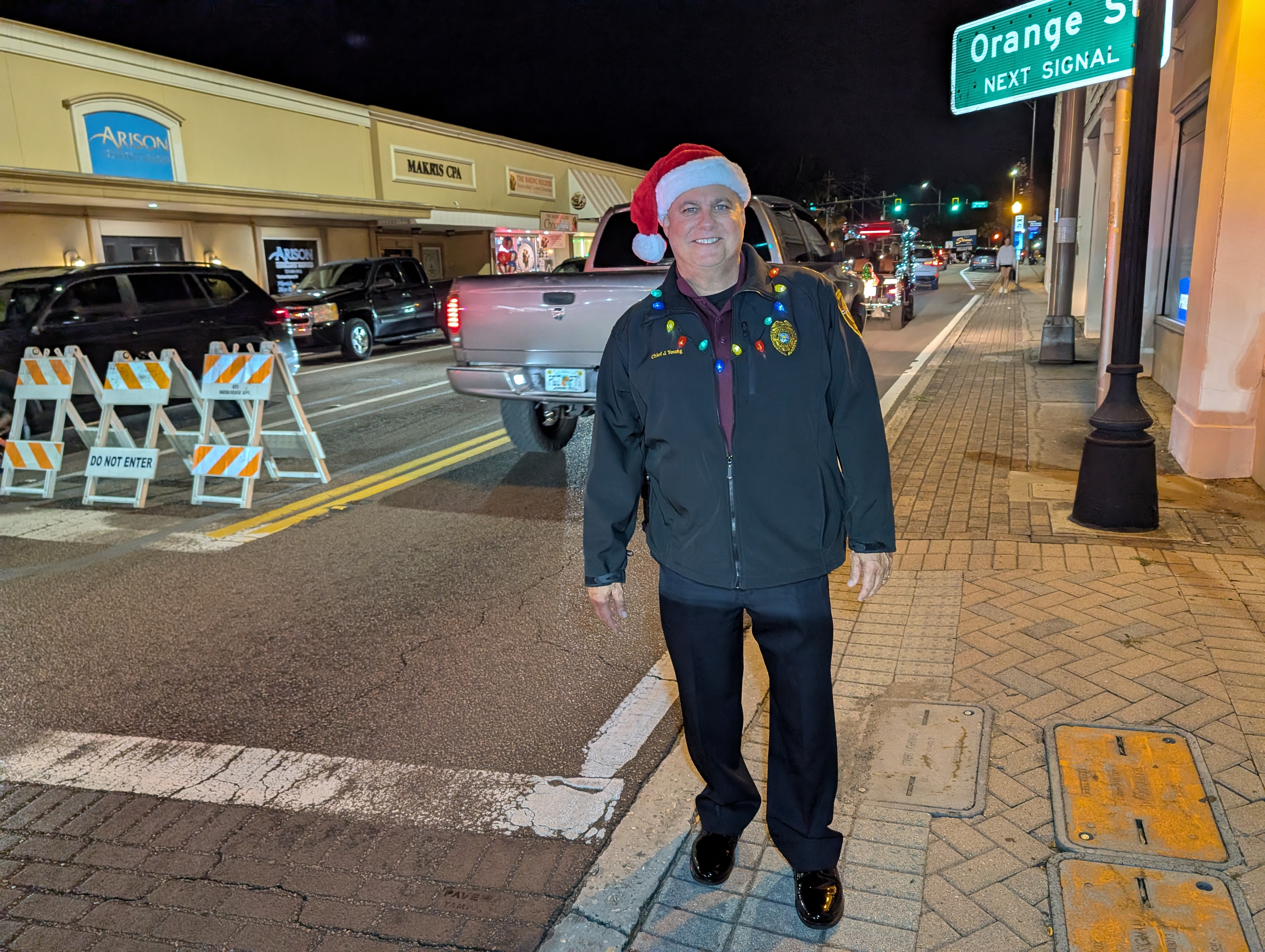
Tarpon Springs Police Chief Jeffrey Young at Snow Place Like Tarpon Springs, December 2025

Chief of police is the most common title for the head of a police department of a city. The highest-ranking officers of boroughs and parishes at a level 10 are also known as police chiefs. In large urban areas, some departments are led by an overseer who is not a sworn officer, usually referred to as a commissioner. In these departments, the police chief is the highest-ranking police officer of the agency but not the department head. The New York City Police Department is one such case where the commissioner is the head of the NYPD. The resources available to the head of a police department vary greatly; the chief of a small town may be the only paid employee of the police department with volunteer officers at their disposal only on certain occasions. On the other hand, the chief of a major city may have thousands or in the case of very large cities such as New York tens of thousands of sworn officers. Such a department may have thousands of employees other than police officers, including operators, secretaries, and unsworn peace officers. Alternative titles for a chief of police include police commissioner, colonel, police superintendent, police president or police director.

A sheriff is the chief of a county law enforcement agency. Although sheriffs are not usually counted as police chiefs, their agencies usually have the powers and role of a police department (although in some rare cases, the role of a sheriff's agency is limited to non-policing matters such as courtroom security). The usual difference between a sheriff and a police chief is that sheriffs are elected (except in New York City, Rhode Island and Hawaii) and responsible for a county whereas a police chief manages law enforcement in a city or town and is appointed by its local government. Many state constitutions require every county to have a sheriff; some make no provision for this position to be eliminated even in the case of the formation of a consolidated city–county or "metropolitan government" because of which a decision on the division the powers between the county sheriff and the city chief of police is made. The usual compromise allows the chief of police to exercise law enforcement jurisdiction and to give the sheriff and his deputies authority over jails and the serving of civil papers. An alternative and lesser-used solution is to make the office of sheriff a purely ceremonial one. One other solution, an example of which is seen in the case of the Las Vegas Metropolitan Police Department, is to provide for the sheriff to simultaneously serve as the chief of police, thus remaining as the chief law enforcement officer (CLEO) of the county. Other titles for the executives of Sheriff's Departments include colonel, superintendent, and director.

The fraternal organization International Association of Chiefs of Police (IACP) is an organization that many chiefs of police are associated with.

The amount of influence politics has over a police department is also an important topic and varies greatly from one jurisdiction to another. U.S. law enforcement officers, including small-town police chiefs and their charges, are increasingly being required to meet at least minimum levels of professional training.

The rank insignia for the chief of a large or medium-sized department most often consists of three or four gold stars, similar to the insignia of a lieutenant general or general in the army. Smaller departments and state agencies most often consists of silver or gold eagles similar to colonel in the army; however, several small departments with only a few dozen employees have been known to possess five star rank insignia for the police chief, the same as a General of the Army . On the opposite, some extremely small police department chiefs wear no rank insignia at all, or simply a pin which reads "CHIEF".

== See also ==
- Deputy prime minister
- Deputy governor
- Deputy president
- Prime minister
- Governor
- President
- Chief justice
- Police
- Highway patrol
- Law enforcement
- Law enforcement agency
- Fire chief
- Constable
