= New Westminster Police Department =

- Heraldic badge of the NWPD
- Abbreviation: NWPD

Agency overview
- Formed: 1873
- Annual budget: 38 million CDN (2026)

Jurisdictional structure
- Operations jurisdiction: New Westminster, British Columbia, Canada
- Governing body: New Westminster Police Board
- Constituting instrument: BC Police Act
- General nature: Local civilian police

Operational structure
- Headquarters: 555 Columbia Street
- Elected officers responsible: The Honourable Jessy Sahota, Minister of Public Safety and Solicitor General of British Columbia; Police Board Chair Tasha Henderson, Chair of the New Westminster Police Board
- Agency executive: Paul Hyland, Chief Constable

Website
- https://www.nwpolice.org

The New Westminster Police Department is the police force for the City of New Westminster, British Columbia, Canada. It occupies the lower floors of the pool former Federal Building and Post Office at 555 Columbia Street, at the corner of 6th Street. The force has around one hundred members.

== History ==
The force was created in 1873 when the city council hired as its first constable Jonathan Morey, a former sergeant with the Royal Engineers, Columbia detachment, who stayed behind after the detachment was disbanded in 1863. Other residents were temporarily deputized when needed; by the 1880s, as the number of constables increased, badges and uniforms were introduced and patrol routes and a budget instituted; the budget was reduced after a fire destroyed much of the city in 1898.

From 1901 to 2001, except for a period in 1970 during renovations, the New Westminster Police Department was at the New Westminster City Hall. It was professionalized in the early 20th century and reorganized during the 1920s, when it also adopted the then new system of single fingerprint identification and was the first Canadian police department to use a modus operandi system. In 1977 the department established a Community Services Division, one of the earliest in British Columbia; in 1991 it opened a Community Police Office in the former Canadian Pacific Railway station.

In 2001 the department moved to its own building and opened the New Westminster Police Museum, including materials assembled by the former New Westminster Police Historical Society and by Detective Constable D.E.A. "Ted" Usher, who published a book on the history of the department in 2000. There is no longer a museum inside the New Westminster Police Department building.

== Controversy ==
On January 21, 2009, three off-duty police officers were arrested and detained overnight after being alleged to have racially abused, assaulted and participated in a robbery in downtown Vancouver against Firoz (Phil) Khan, a newspaper deliveryman. The police constables came from the Delta Police Department, West Vancouver Police Department and New Westminster Police Service. On January 26, 2009, the Vancouver Police Department recommended to Crown Counsel for criminal charges to be laid against NWPS member Jeffrey Roger Klassen for assault and possession of stolen property and the WVPD officer Griffin Gillan for robbery. At the same time, the DPD officer was cleared of any wrongdoing. Constable Jeffrey Klassen was conditionally discharged from the NWPD and sentenced to 1 year probation and 100 hours of community service after being found guilty of assault in April 2011.

In September 2019, an account linked to the department attempted to make several notable edits to the New Westminster Police Wikipedia page. These included changing "police force" to "police department" throughout the page and removing the "controversy" section in its entirety.

== See also ==
- E-Comm, 9-1-1 call and dispatch centre for southwestern BC
