= Baltej Singh Dhillon =

Canadian politician and police officer

The Honourable Baltej Singh Dhillon
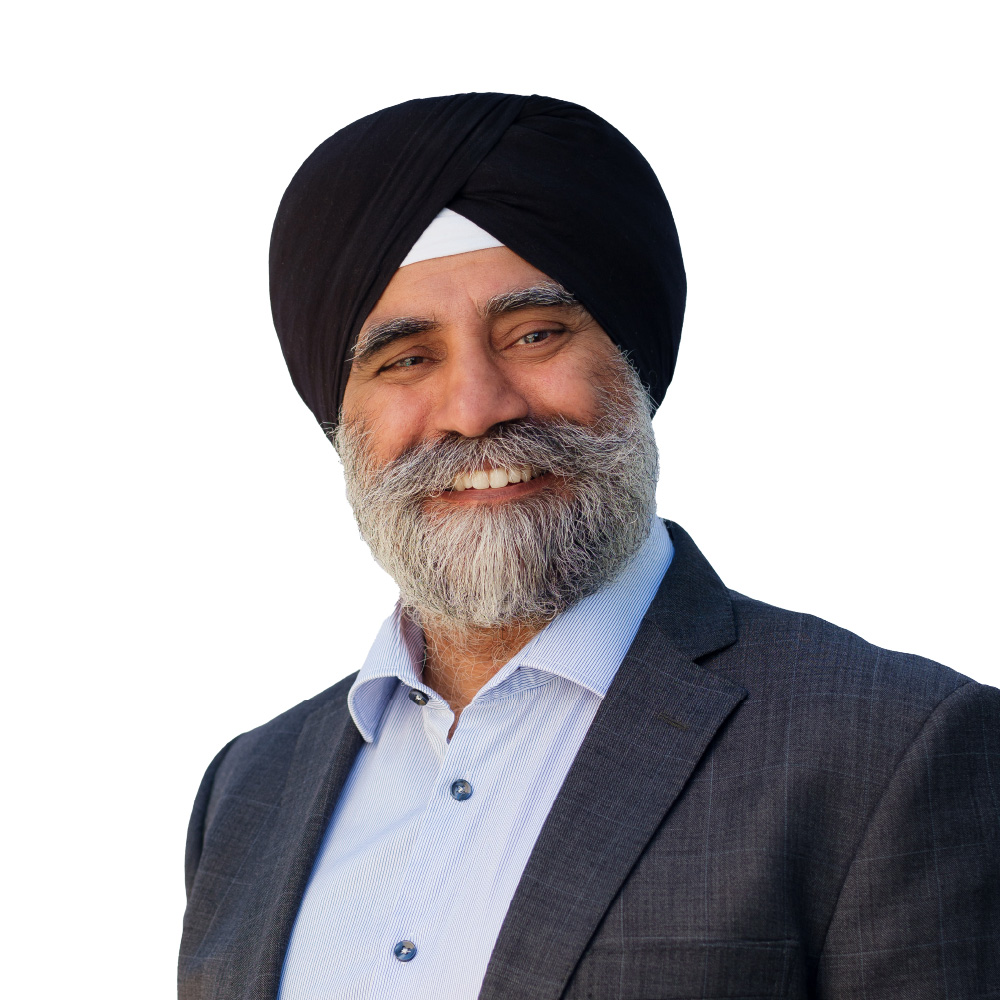
- Dhillon in 2024

Canadian Senator from British Columbia
- Incumbent
- Assumed office February 7, 2025
- Nominated by: Justin Trudeau
- Appointed by: Mary Simon

Personal details
- Born: November 13, 1966 (age 59) Malaysia
- Party: Independent Senators Group
- Other political affiliations: British Columbia New Democratic
- Profession: RCMP officer; politician
- Website: sencanada.ca/en/senators/dhillon-baltej-s/

Baltej Singh Dhillon (born November 13, 1966) is a Canadian politician and retired police officer who has been a Canadian senator from British Columbia (BC) since 2025. Dhillon is affiliated with the Independent Senators Group (ISG) and was appointed on the advice of Prime Minister Justin Trudeau. Prior to his appointment, he was a member of the Royal Canadian Mounted Police (RCMP) for 30 years. He was first RCMP officer to be allowed to wear a turban when he joined in 1991.

== Early life ==
Dhillon was born in Malaysia in 1966 and immigrated to Canada with his family in 1983. After graduating from high school, he went on to Kwantlen College to study criminology with hopes of becoming a criminal lawyer. Having been advised to do some volunteer work to improve his chances of getting into law school, he helped the Royal Canadian Mounted Police (RCMP) launch the Block Watch program in his community and was subsequently hired by the force to work on the program.

== Police career ==
Based on his previous experiences, Dhillon decided that he wanted to join the RCMP. He went to a recruiting office and met all the initial requirements. The recruiting officer raised the delicate issue of the turban. RCMP policy did not allow it, however the issue went to then-Commissioner of the RCMP, Norman Inkster. Inkster sided with Dhillon, and pressure was put on the federal government to change the policy.

Dhillon's request (and subsequent support from Inkster) created much controversy. Many opposed to the change believed that the stetson was part of the uniform and allowing a turban into such an all-Canadian institution would change the face of a national icon.

Over 150,000 people signed petitions to retain the traditional RCMP dress code, and sympathetic legislators presented the results to Parliament. Conversely, Sikh leaders pointed out that turbaned Sikhs in the British Indian Army served in two World Wars and now work in many Canadian police forces.

On March 16, 1990, the federal Solicitor General, Pierre Cadieux, announced in the House of Commons that the policy was theretofore amended to permit Sikhs to wear the turban while on active duty in the RCMP. Dhillon subsequently entered the RCMP Academy, Depot Division, in Regina, Saskatchewan, as the first turbaned cadet. Dhillon's career saw him, among other things, work as an investigator with the 1985 Air India bombing task force.

As a staff sergeant, Dhillon served as head of the British Columbia RCMP Provincial Intelligence Centre, which is composed of members of the RCMP, Canadian Security Intelligence Service, municipal police services and civilian staff. He participated in major crimes and polygraph, as they were his previous area of expertise.

== Political career ==
In 2024, Dhillon was nominated as a BC New Democratic Party candidate for the 2024 British Columbia general election, running in Surrey-Serpentine River. He placed second behind former Mayor of Surrey Linda Hepner of the Conservative Party of British Columbia.

On February 7, 2025, he was nominated and appointed to the Senate of Canada by Justin Trudeau.

== Personal life ==
As of 2025, Dhillon resides in Surrey with his wife, mother, and two daughters.

== Electoral record ==
2024 British Columbia general election: Surrey-Serpentine River
Party	Candidate	Votes	%	±%	Expenditures
Conservative	Linda Hepner	9,782	49.7%	+47.8	
New Democratic	Baltej Singh Dhillon	9,347	47.5%	-3.7	
Independent	James McMurtry	554	2.8%	–	
Total valid votes		19,683	–		
Total rejected ballots					
Turnout					
Registered voters					
Conservative notional gain from New Democratic		Swing		+25.8	
Note: Changes in percentage value and swing calculated using the 2020 redistributed results.
Source: Elections BC
