= Surrey-Serpentine River =

Provincial electoral district in British Columbia, Canada

British Columbia electoral district
- Interactive map of riding boundaries

Provincial electoral district
- Legislature: Legislative Assembly of British Columbia
MLA
Jessy Sahota
Conservative
- District created: 2023
- First contested: 2024
- Last contested: 2026

Demographics
- Population (2021): 58,721
- Area (km²): 36
- Pop. density (per km²): 1,631.1
- Census division: Metro Vancouver
- Census subdivision: Surrey (part)

Surrey-Serpentine River is a provincial electoral district for the Legislative Assembly of British Columbia.

The riding was created under the 2021 British Columbia electoral redistribution and was first contested in the 2024 general election. It was formed from parts of Surrey-Cloverdale, Surrey-Panorama and Surrey-Fleetwood.

== Demographics ==
Population, 2021	58,721
Area (km^{2})	36
Pop. Density (people per km^{2})	1,631
Source: BC Electoral Boundaries Commission

== Geography ==
The riding is named after the Serpentine River which flows through this area of Surrey.

== Members of the Legislative Assembly ==
This riding has elected the following members of the Legislative Assembly:

Assembly	Years	Member	Party
Surrey-Serpentine River; Riding created from Surrey-Cloverdale; Surrey-Panorama and Surrey-Fleetwood
43rd	2024–2026	Linda Hepner	Conservative
43rd	2026–2026	Linda Hepner	Independent
43rd	2026–2026	Linda Hepner	Conservative
44th	2026–present	Jessy Sahota	Conservative

== Election results ==
2026 British Columbia general election
The 2026 general election will be held on October 24.
Party	Candidate	Votes	%	±%	Expenditures
Conservative	Jessy Sahota				
New Democratic	Sikander Kang				
OneBC	Todd Holowchak				
Freedom	Errol Povah				
CentreBC	Judy Higginbotham				
Total valid votes			–		
Total rejected ballots					
Turnout					
Registered voters					
Elections BC

2024 British Columbia general election
Party	Candidate	Votes	%	±%	Expenditures
Conservative	Linda Hepner	9,782	49.7%	+47.8	
New Democratic	Baltej Singh Dhillon	9,347	47.5%	−3.7	
Independent	James McMurtry	554	2.8%	–	
Total valid votes		19,683	–		
Total rejected ballots					
Turnout					
Registered voters					
Conservative notional gain from New Democratic		Swing		+25.8	
Note: Changes in percentage value and swing calculated using the 2020 redistributed results.
Source: Elections BC

2020 provincial election redistributed results
Party	%
New Democratic	51.2
Liberal	40.0
Green	6.0
Conservative	1.9
Others	0.9

== See also ==
- List of British Columbia provincial electoral districts
- Canadian provincial electoral districts
