= Richard P. Rosenthal =

American writer and law enforcement officer

Richard P. Rosenthal is an American author and law enforcement officer. In 2011, he retired as the chief of police of Wellfleet, Massachusetts on Cape Cod, where he served for over 20 years. Prior, he served two decades as an NYPD officer, retiring at the rank of lieutenant.

Rosenthal has written two books on police work, one on "skycops" and one on K-9 units, as well as a novel and a memoir about police undercover work. He is the 100th writer to have been added to Police-Writers.com, a website dedicated to police officers turned authors.

As a rookie cop for the NYPD, he was assigned to work undercover in the JDL; it is the subject of his fourth book.

Richard Rosenthal spent twenty years in the New York City Police Department, where he ran the Heavy Weapons and Undercover Weapons Training programs and ... dealt with homicide, narcotics, and armed robbery. Before joining the NYPD, he worked for U.S. Air Force military intelligence as a Russian language specialist. ... [H]is novel, The Murder of Old Comrades, "a spicy police procedural about KGB assassins on the loose in Manhattan," according to The Wall Street Journal, ... "put Mr. Rosenthal on the map in big-league publishing."

— Kirkus Reviews, June 15, 2000.

== Books ==
- 1992: Murder of Old Comrades, (novel) With Amy Rosenthal. Eric Tobias, ed. Pocket Books. ISBN 0-671-70732-9. ISBN 978-0-671-70732-3.
- 1994: Sky Cops: Stories from America's Airborne Police. With Amy Rosenthal. Pocket Books. ISBN 0-671-79516-3. ISBN 978-0-671-79516-0.
- 1997: K-9 Cops: Stories from America's K-9 Police Units. Pocket Books. ISBN 0-671-00023-3, ISBN 978-0-671-00023-3.
- 2000: Rookie Cop: Deep Undercover in the Jewish Defense League. (memoir) Leapfrog Press. ISBN 0-9654578-8-5, ISBN 978-0-9654578-8-0.
- 2014: Practical Handgun Training Amazon.com.ISBN 978-0-9888828-1-2.
- 2014: Self-Publishing Simplified! Amazon.com. ISBN 978-1-5003-1930-4.
