= Tamanawis Secondary School =

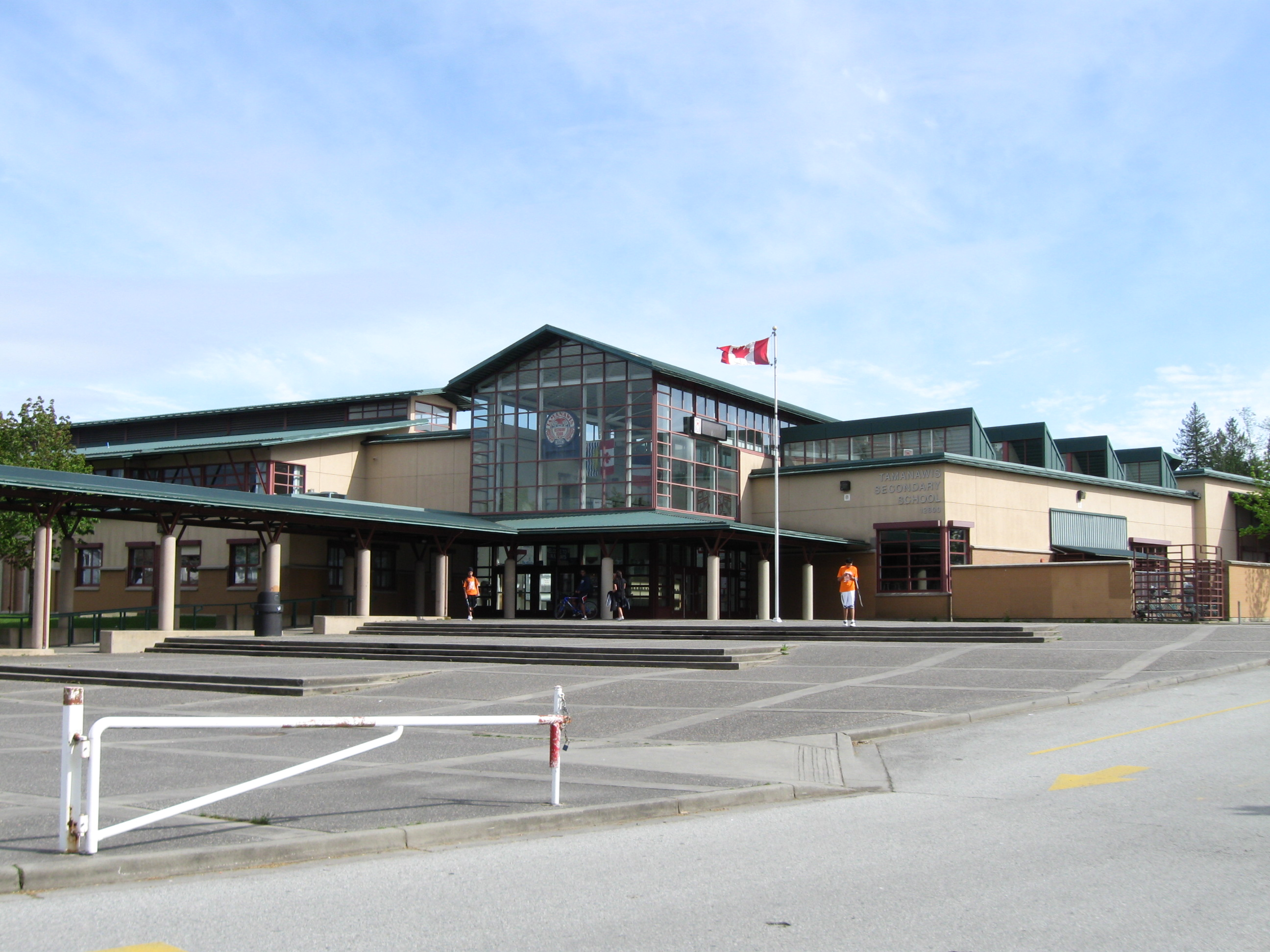

Location
- 12600 66 Ave; Surrey, British Columbia, V3W 2A8; Canada; 49.1222°N 122.8716°W

Information
- School type: high school
- Motto: Community, Engaged Learners, Inspired Citizens
- Founded: 1995
- School district: School District 36 Surrey
- School number: 3636150
- Principal: Mr. James Johnston
- Staff: 88
- Grades: 8-12
- Enrollment: 1,469 (2025)
- Language: English, French
- Area: Newton, Surrey
- Colours: Blue/White/Red
- Team name: Wildcats
- Website: www.surreyschools.ca/schools/tamanawis/Pages/default.aspx

Tamanawis Secondary is a public secondary school in Surrey, British Columbia. It is a part of School District 36.

== History ==
Tamanawis Secondary was opened in 1994. The school's design is also very similar to that of Elgin Park Secondary School.

In recent history, Tamanawis was the site of a manslaughter where 18-year-old Mehakpreet Sethi was fatally stabbed by a member of a group of six to ten assailants in November 2022. The accused plead guilty and faced manslaughter charges with a sentence of house arrest for two years. Perpetrator names were not released to the public as they were minors attending Tamanawis at the time.

== Sports Programs & Activities ==
The school is well known for its sports programs, with its basketball and other teams consistently performing well in the BC Provincial Championships. The boys basketball team won the Fraser Valley in 2014, 2016 and 2018 while finishing 3rd in the province in 2014 and 2018 and 2nd in 2016. Tamanawis is the only Surrey public school to win the Fraser Valley since 1981. The boys soccer team also won the Fraser Valley's in 2013 and 2015.

Tamanawis was also the home school of STUDIO99, a group of teen filmmakers who make short films in all genres as well as cover many school events, like the Tamanawis Christmas Community Dinner, where the jazz band annually makes an appearance.

Tamanawis also hosts a number of clubs including: Empowerment, Award winning Theatre Company and Cure for Cancer Club.

Tamanawis Secondary School and Elgin Park Secondary School both share the same architectural design, including the gym which resembles many similarities.

== Notable alumni ==
- Scott Hannan, retired San Jose Sharks defenseman
- Natasha Wodak, long-distance runner and Olympian
- Jessy Sahota, politician
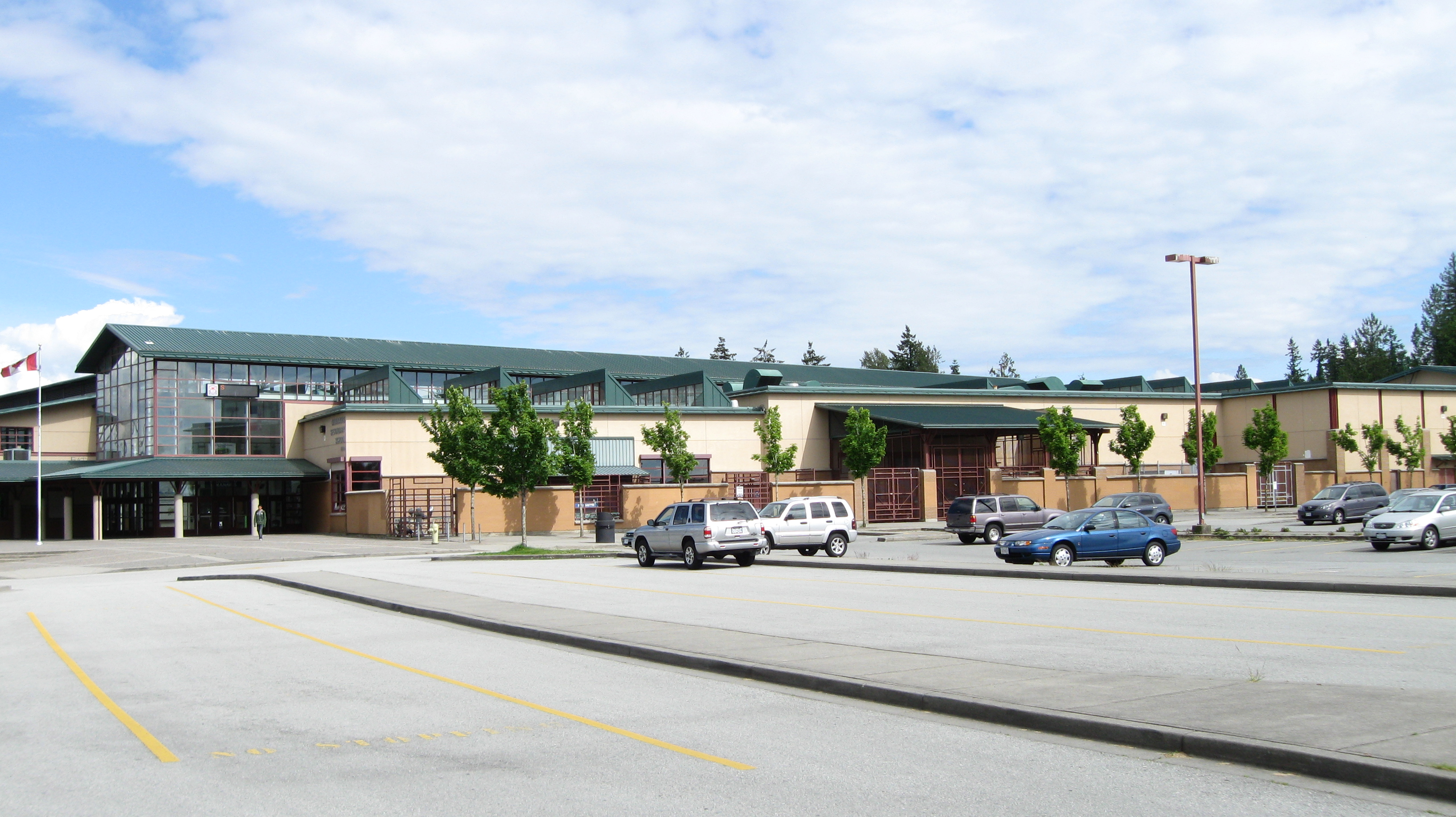
A side view of Tamanawis Secondary
