= Jessy Sahota =

Canadian politician

The Honourable Jessy Sahota MLA
- Sahota in 2026

Minister of Public Safety Solicitor General of British Columbia
- Incumbent
- Assumed office November 20, 2026
- Premier: Lorne Doerkson
- Preceded by: Nina Krieger

Member of the British Columbia Legislative Assembly for Surrey-Serpentine River
- Incumbent
- Assumed office October 24, 2026
- Preceded by: Linda Hepner

Personal details
- Party: BC Conservative

Jessy Sahota MLA is a Canadian politician who is the Member of the British Columbia Legislative Assembly for Surrey-Serpentine River since the 2026 British Columbia general election He is a police officer with the Delta Police Department, and a three-time Canadian National Champion in wrestling. Sahota was the Conservative Party of Canada candidate for Delta in the 2025 Canadian federal election, but was not elected.

== Background ==
Sahota was born in Phagwara Punjab, then moved to British Columbia as a refugee and graduated from Tamanawis Secondary School in 2010. He attended Simon Fraser University as a scholarship athlete and graduated in 2015 with a Bachelor's degree in criminology.

== Policing career ==
After graduating, Sahota worked with the Surrey School District's RCMP Wrap Program. He joined the Delta Police Department in 2016 and served on its Patrol Support Team and Violence Suppression Team before becoming a youth liaison constable. In that role he worked with at-risk and high-risk youth, many with gang affiliations, using a trauma-informed approach in which the criminal justice system is treated as a last resort.

In 2022, the International Association of Chiefs of Police named Sahota to its "40 Under 40" list. According to Drishti Magazine, the 40 honourees were officers from the United States, United Kingdom, United Arab Emirates, India and other countries, and were recognized at a ceremony in Texas. He has also received the Queen Elizabeth II Platinum Jubilee award for his police service and volunteer work.

== Community involvement ==
Sahota has volunteered as a coach with a Lower mainland charity that works to keep at-risk youth away from drugs, gangs, crime and violence, since 2009. According to Drishti Magazine, he has logged more than 4,000 documented volunteer hours and has coached more than 250 youth in wrestling and kabaddi. With his brother Paul, he also coaches high school wrestling at Tamanawis Secondary and North Delta Secondary.

== Political career ==
Sahota was announced as the Conservative candidate for Delta ahead of the 2025 Canadian federal election. The riding was won by Liberal Jill McKnight.

In the 2026 British Columbia general election, Sahota ran for the BC Conservatives in Surrey-Serpentine River and defeated BC NDP candidate Sikander Kang. The riding had been won in 2024 by Conservative Linda Hepner. The Conservatives won a majority government in the election.

== Athletic career ==
=== Wrestling ===
Sahota is a three-time Canadian national wrestling champion. At the World Police and Fire Games, he won gold in the 125 kg heavyweight division in China (2019), the Netherlands (2022) and Winnipeg (2023), where he won six matches. He returned to competition after breaking his right arm and tearing a bicep in a wrestling accident, which required surgery.

=== Kabaddi ===
Sahota has represented Canada in kabaddi eight times and has played for the Surrey Superstars kabaddi team. According to Drishti Magazine, he won the Kabaddi World Cup and has travelled to more than 20 countries to compete in wrestling and kabaddi.

== Electoral record ==
=== Federal elections ===
2025 Canadian federal election: Delta
Party	Candidate	Votes	%	±%	Expenditures
Liberal	Jill McKnight	32,802	51.83	+9.28	$118,216.69
Conservative	Jessy Sahota	27,314	43.15	+9.62	$123,210.05
New Democratic	Jason McCormick	2,787	4.40	–14.04	$2,265.82
People's	Natasa Sirotic	390	0.62	–1.86	$4,848.00
Total valid votes/expense limit		63,293	99.46	–	$130,926.91
Total rejected ballots		344	0.54	–0.03	
Turnout		63,637	74.12	+6.58	
Eligible voters		85,862			
Liberal notional hold		Swing		–0.17	
Source: Elections Canada

=== Provincial elections ===
2026 British Columbia general election: Surrey-Serpentine River
Party	Candidate	Votes	%	±%	Expenditures
Conservative	Jessy Sahota	10,857	58.06	+8.36	
New Democratic	Sikander Kang	6,090	32.57	-14.92	
CentreBC	Judy Higginbotham	941	5.03	—	
OneBC	Todd Holowchak	629	3.36	—	
Freedom	Errol Povah	131	0.70	—	
Total valid votes		18,648	99.72		
Total rejected ballots		53	0.28		
Turnout		18,701			
Registered voters					
Conservative hold		Swing		+11.64	
Elections BC
