= Smith & Wesson .38/44 =

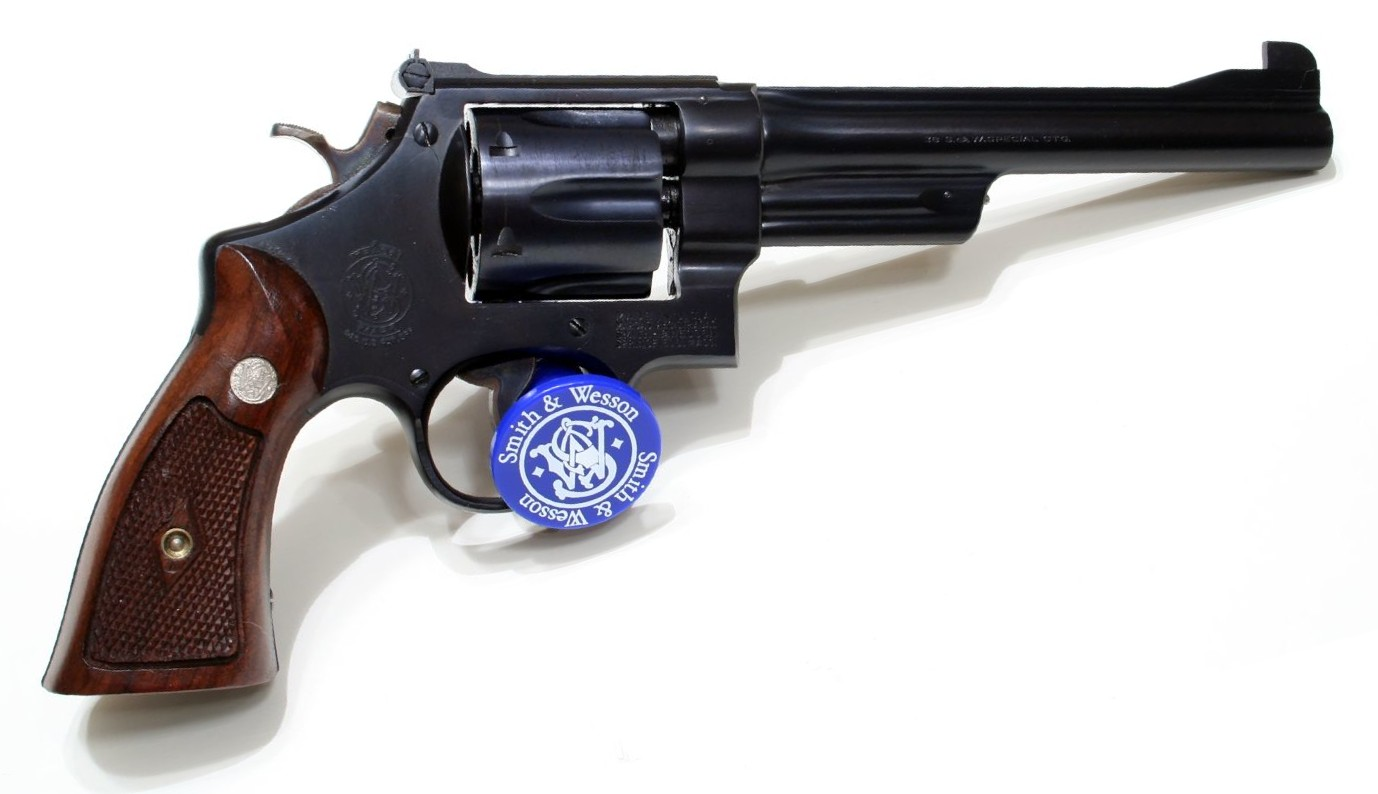
- A post-war .38/44 Outdoorsman
- Type: Revolver
- Place of origin: United States

Production history
- Manufacturer: Smith & Wesson
- Produced: 1930–1941; 1946–1966
- Variants: Heavy Duty; Outdoorsman; Model 20; Model 23

Specifications
- Mass: 40 ounces (1.1 kg)
- Barrel length: 4-inch (10 cm); 5-inch (13 cm); 6.5-inch (17 cm)
- Cartridge: .38 Special
- Action: Double-action
- Feed system: 6-round cylinder

Smith & Wesson .38/44 identifies a series of 6-round cylinder, double-action, Smith & Wesson N-frame revolvers chambered for the .38 Special cartridge loaded to higher pressures than were considered appropriate for earlier revolvers chambered for that cartridge. High-pressure .38/44 loadings of the .38 Special cartridge represented a transition between conventional .38 Special ammunition and the new more powerful .357 Magnum ammo. Revolvers were manufactured from 1930 to 1941, and after World War II from 1946 to 1966 until competitively priced .357 Magnum revolvers became widely available.

== History ==
In the 1920s and the 1930s, the inability of conventional police service revolver ammunition to reliably penetrate heavy steel framed automobiles was perceived as a problem as United States law enforcement agencies encountered well organized and funded bootleggers. In response, Smith & Wesson introduced the large frame .38/44 Heavy Duty in 1930. It was based on the .44 Special Smith & Wesson Triple Lock revolver and was made with a 5-inch (13 cm) barrel and fixed sights. The following year, Smith & Wesson began production of the .38/44 Outdoorsman with a 6.5-inch (17 cm) barrel and adjustable sights.

These new revolvers were chambered for a new more powerful type of .38 Special ammunition capable of firing a 158-grain (10.2 g) metal-penetrating copper-tipped lead-alloy bullet at 1,125 feet (343 m) per second. In comparison, conventional .38 Special ammunition fires a 158-grain (10.2 g) bullets at 755 feet (230 m) per second. It was easily capable of penetrating the automobile bodies and body armor of that era.

A 4-inch (10 cm) barrel was offered in 1935 for users willing to accept the reduced ballistic performance of a more compact firearm. The media attention gathered by the .38/44 and its ammunition encouraged Smith & Wesson to develop the longer .357 Magnum cartridge in 1935. The .38/44 was an option for purchasers unwilling to pay the premium pricing of the new .357 Magnum revolvers.

The .38/44 revolvers were available with either a blued or nickel-plated finish. Production was interrupted by the World War II. Postwar production serial numbers are prefixed with the letter S. After the war, these N-frame revolvers were popular with veterans experimenting with .38 Special handloads at pressures up to 50% higher than the 15,000 psi (100 MPa) recommended for conventional .38 Special revolvers.

In 1957, the "Heavy Duty" fixed sight version was marketed as the Smith & Wesson Model 20 and the "Outdoorsman" with adjustable sights became the Smith & Wesson Model 23.
