= Abbotsford Police Department =

Canadian municipal police department

Abbotsford Police Department Service de police d'Abbotsford
- APD heraldic badge

- Shoulder patch of the APD
- Common name: Abby PD
- Abbreviation: APD

Agency overview
- Formed: January 1, 1995
- Preceding agencies: Matsqui Police Department [1905 - 1925, 1955 - 1995]; Abbotsford RCMP
- Employees: 304+
- Annual budget: 30 million+ CDN

Jurisdictional structure
- Operations jurisdiction: Abbotsford, British Columbia
- Governing body: Abbotsford Police Board
- Constituting instrument: BC Police Act
- General nature: Local civilian police

Operational structure
- Headquarters: 2838 Justice Way
- Police constables: 216
- Civilians: 100+
- Elected officers responsible: The Honourable Mike Farnworth, Minister of Public Safety and Solicitor General of British Columbia; His Worship Ross Siemens, Mayor & chair of the Abbotsford Police Board
- Agency executive: Colin Watson, Chief constable

Website
- abbypd.ca

The Abbotsford Police Department (APD; French: Service de police d'Abbotsford) is the police force for the City of Abbotsford, British Columbia, Canada. The force was established in 1955 as the Matsqui Police Department and was renamed the Abbotsford Police Department when Matsqui and Abbotsford amalgamated in 1995 to become the City of Abbotsford. The vision of the Abbotsford Police Department is to have the "Strength in Community". The mission of the Abbotsford Police Department is "make Abbotsford the safest city in BC".

The force is divided into six branches: patrol, criminal investigation, finance and budget, human resources, operations support, and support services. The chief constable is Colin Watson. The organization has 216 sworn officers, 84 civilians and over 100 volunteers, according to the police board and 2011 Abbotsford Police Department Compstat reports.

== Members killed in the line of duty ==
Since its founding in 1955, the APD has had two policemen killed in the line of duty.

Rank and name	Date	Cause of death
Constable John Goyer	April 19, 2006	Assault
Constable John Davidson	November 6, 2017	Gunfire
