= West Vancouver Police Department =

West Vancouver Police Department Service de police de West Vancouver
- Heraldic badge of the WVPD

- Shoulder flash of the West Vancouver Police
- Abbreviation: WVPD
- Motto: Serving with Honour

Agency overview
- Formed: May 7, 1912
- Employees: 105
- Volunteers: 75
- Annual budget: $15.7 million CDN(2019)

Jurisdictional structure
- Operations jurisdiction: West Vancouver, British Columbia, Canada
- Governing body: West Vancouver Police Board
- Constituting instrument: BC Police Act
- General nature: Local civilian police

Operational structure
- Headquarters: 755 16th Street
- Police constables: 79
- Civilians: 24
- Elected officer responsible: The Honourable Garry Begg, Minister of Public Safety and Solicitor General of British Columbia
- Agency executive: John Lo, chief constable

Website
- https://westvanpolice.ca/

The West Vancouver Police Department (WVPD; French: Service de police de West Vancouver) is the municipal police force for the district of West Vancouver, British Columbia, Canada.

== Operations ==
The West Vancouver Police respond to calls for service using one of four Patrol Teams. Each Team is staffed by several Constables, a Sergeant (Road Supervisor), and with oversight from a Staff Sergeant (Watch Commander).

The patrol division is augmented by several support sections including, Traffic, Community Policing / School Liaison, Records, Surveillance, Intel., and Victim Services.

Serious crimes are investigated by Detectives on the Major Investigations Team.

Homicides that occur in the District of West Vancouver are investigated by the Integrated Homicide Investigation Team which is supplemented by a seconded WVPD member.

To further support the concept of seamless policing within the Lower Mainland region, several WVPD members are seconded to various other integrated municipal/provincial RCMP units. These include; the Integrated Road Safety Unit (IRSU), the Integrated First Nations Unit (IFNU), the Combined Forces Special Enforcement Unit (CFSEU), the Integrated Forensic Identification Section (IFIS), and the Integrated Crash Analysis and Reconstruction Service (ICARS).

The West Vancouver Police Department relies on the support of civilian employees, as well as a civilian volunteer base.

== History of the West Vancouver Police Department ==
On May 7, 1912, the West Vancouver City Council appointed John Teare as the first police constable. On May 28, 1912, city council appointed F.H. Kettle as the second constable.

The first police office was in an upstairs room in the original municipal hall, built in 1912.

On July 9, 1912, city council appointed a third constable, Richard Jones. The resolution read, "That Richard D. Jones be appointed constable for that section Northwest of White Cliff City without salary."

On July 23, 1912, John Teare was appointed as the chief of police. The resolution read, "That John Teare be hereby appointed Chief of Police with jurisdiction over all other constables within the Municipality, without salary."

== Student work advisory team ==
The student work advisory team is composed of student volunteers. The student team is overseen by Cpl. Kellie English of the community services unit.

The student work advisory team assists the police at community events such as, the annual police carnival, Community Day, and the Coho Festival.

The students also assist in crime prevention initiatives while working directly with Cpl. English, such as theft from auto prevention and traffic safety initiatives such as pedestrian safety.

== Controversy ==
On 26 June 2007, the police board announced that it had hired Kashmir (Kash) Heed to begin as the new chief constable. The department had been without a chief constable since the December 5, 2006, when Scott Armstrong's position as chief constable was terminated. Revelations of an after-hours social gathering at the police station, and the subsequent impaired driving arrest of a West Vancouver police constable, were the speculated reasoning for Armstrong's termination as chief constable. The city's mayor, however, denied the two incidents were linked.

On January 21, 2009, three off-duty police officers were arrested after allegations of racial abuse, assault, and participation in a robbery in downtown Vancouver. The victim was identified as Firoz (Phil) Khan, a newspaper deliveryman. The police constables were then employed by; the Delta Police Department, West Vancouver Police Department and New Westminster Police Service. On January 26, 2009, the Vancouver Police Department recommended to Crown Counsel for criminal charges to be laid against the NWPS member for assault and possession of stolen property and the WVPD officer for robbery. At the same time, the DPD officer was cleared of any wrongdoing.

On January 27, 2009, WVPD officer Griffin Gillan was suspended with pay for 30 days pending criminal charges. On January 28, 2009, Crown Counsel approved one count of robbery against Gillan. Gillan was convicted of assault, and was sentenced to a 21-day conditional sentence plus six months probation. Following several disciplinary investigations, the officer was retained by the West Vancouver Police Department despite the criminal record, with a reduction in rank for one year.

== Gallery ==
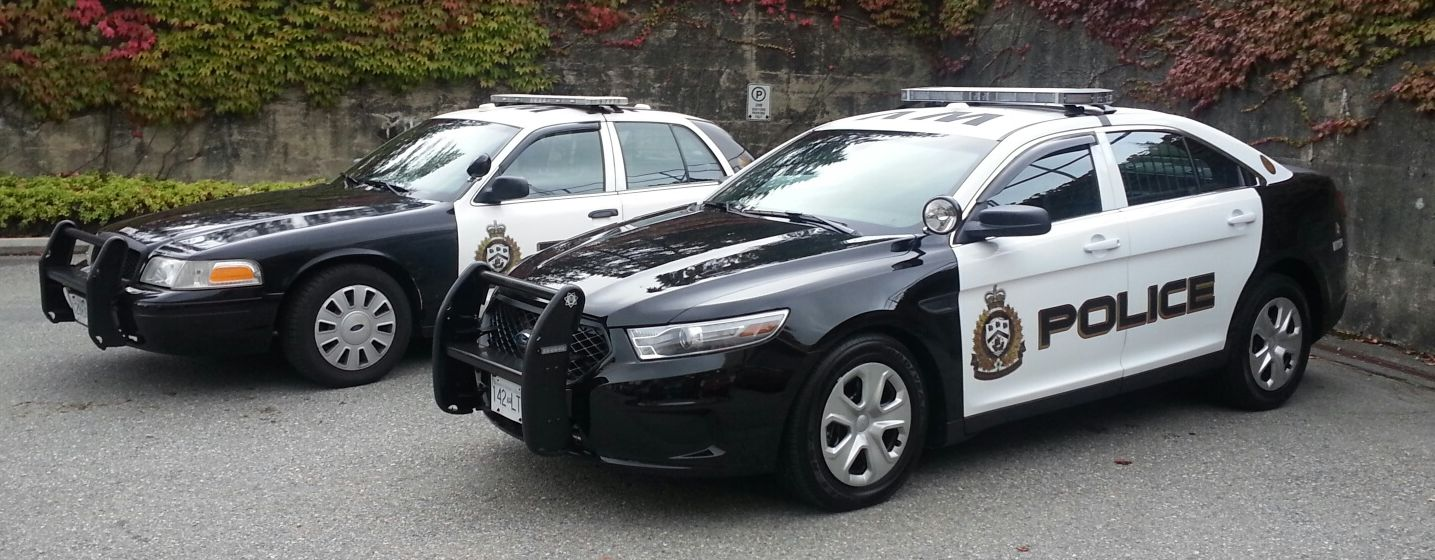
WVPD Ford police interceptors

== See also ==
- E-Comm, 9-1-1 call and dispatch centre for southwestern BC
