= Police board =

A police board, police services board, or police commission is an appointed national or local government commission charged with the responsibility of overseeing a police force within its jurisdiction. Police boards may be required by government regulation, as they are in most of Canada, or they may be voluntarily formed by individual municipalities.

Police boards are generally established to create a degree of separation between political councils and non-political police forces, and are variously responsible for setting the policies, priorities, and budget of a police force; hiring the chief and deputy chiefs of police; determining the structure and organization of the police force; and conducting collective bargaining with police associations. Police boards are usually explicitly prohibited from making operational decisions.

== Canada ==
=== British Columbia ===
All municipalities with a population over 5,000 are required by the British Columbia Police Act to provide for a police service. Municipalities in this category have two options: contract with the provincial government for the Royal Canadian Mounted Police or create an independent local police agency or department.

Municipalities that choose to operate an independent police force are required to create a civilian oversight body called a "Police Board". Members of the police board are civilian members of the community and are appointed by the Minister of Justice and Attorney General through an Order in Council. A police board usually has between five and eight members, depending on the size of the municipality. The Mayor of the municipality is, by law, automatically the Chairperson of the board. One other member of board is usually nominated by the municipality to represent the municipality's interest. Board members are selected from a variety of backgrounds and are usually appointed for one or two year terms. They may be re-appointed to a maximum of six years service. Except for the Mayor, municipal councillors may not be appointed to the municipality's police board.

The mandate of a police board is to own and operate the independent municipal police department ensuring that police independence from political interference is maintained. The board functions as:

- the employer of both the "sworn" police officers and the civilian employees of the department and sets the priorities and develops the administrative policies of the department;
- the financial overseer and develops the annual police operating budget in consultation with the municipal council; and
- the supervisor of the Chief Constable.

The board selects and evaluates the Chief Constable and sometimes other senior departmental managers thereby allowing the board to maintain indirect control and influence over the department, although, in the same way that the police board is independent of the municipal council for policing matters, the Chief Constable is independent from the board for operational matters.

Public complaints against the police were formerly dealt with by the police board. Since July 1, 1998, public complaints are handled by the Police Complaint Commissioner of British Columbia who, as an Officer of the Legislature, is appointed by and responsible to the legislative assembly. Only level of service complaints and complaints against the Chief Constable are still dealt with by the police board.

Police departments may be amalgamated at the discretion of the Minister of Justice and Attorney General. This occurred on January 1, 2003 when Esquimalt and Victoria police departments were amalgamated and a combined police board created with the mayor of Victoria as the chairperson and the mayor of Esquimalt as the vice-chairperson. Enhanced "professional response, crime prevention and investigation in both communities" were cited as the reasons for the amalgamation.

The Royal Canadian Mounted Police (RCMP) are contracted to provide municipal policing to 59 British Columbia municipalities including Surrey, Burnaby, Kelowna, Prince George, Kamloops and Nanaimo. Police boards are not utilized for RCMP municipalities.

There are currently 11 municipal police boards in British Columbia:

- City of Vancouver, British Columbia - population: 569,814 - number of police officers: 1,124 - police to population ratio is 1:507
- City of Abbotsford, British Columbia - population: 127,712 - number of police officers: 158 - police to population ratio is 1:808
- District of Saanich, British Columbia - population: 107,964 - number of police officers: 141 - police to population ratio is 1:766
- District of Delta, British Columbia - population: 100,576 - number of police officers: 141 - police to population ratio is 1:713
- City of Victoria, British Columbia - population: 93,097 - number of police officers: 211 - police to population ratio is 1:441 (includes Township of Esquimalt, British Columbia)
- City of New Westminster, British Columbia - population: 59,426 - number of police officers: 106 - police to population ratio is 1:561
- District of West Vancouver, British Columbia - population: 45,212 - number of police officers: 77 - police to population ratio is 1:587
- City of Port Moody, British Columbia - population: 26,690 - number of police officers: 34 - police to population ratio is 1:785
- District of Oak Bay, British Columbia - population: 18,207 - number of police officers: 22 - police to population ratio is 1:828
- District of Central Saanich, British Columbia - population: 16,091 - number of police officers: 21 - police to population ratio is 1:766
- City of Nelson, British Columbia - population: 9,630 - number of police officers: 17 - police to population ratio is 1:566

==== Exception ====
The 12th police board is not in conformity with the above description of the Police Board and it does not have any elected representative on the board (whereas a Mayor is elected). The South Coast British Columbia Transportation Authority Police Service is a regional police force for the Metro Vancouver region and its police board is made up of five civilian members (including the chair and a senior management from the South Coast British Columbia Transportation Authority), a RCMP "E" Division Assistant Commander and a Vancouver Police Department Deputy Chief Constable. They are all appointed by the Minister of Justice and Attorney General through an Order in Council.

== Philippines ==
The National Police Commission is an agency attached to the Department of the Interior and Local Government (DILG) responsible for the administrative control and operational supervision of the Philippine National Police (PNP). It has the authority to conduct police entrance examinations, investigate complaints against police anomalies and irregularities, and summarily dismiss erring police officers.

== United States ==
=== Chicago, Illinois ===
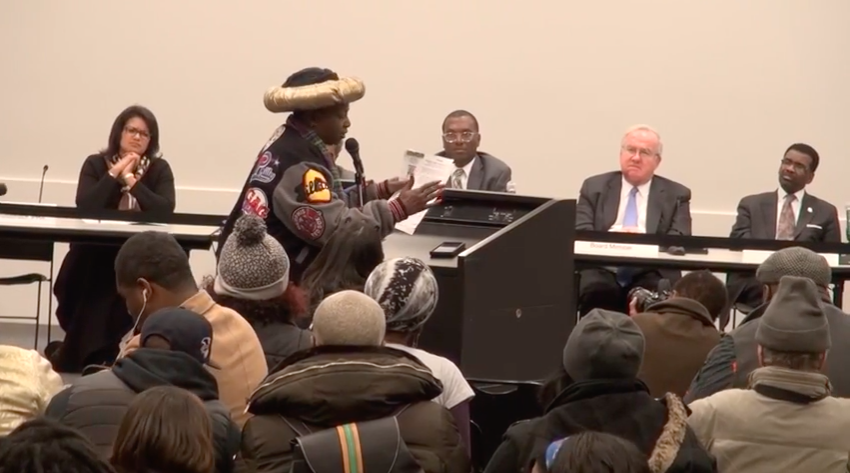
A member of the public rises to speak during a 2015 Chicago Police Board hearing.

The Chicago Police Department is administered by the Chicago Police Board. The Board is composed of nine members, each of whom is appointed by the City's Mayor, and is responsible for nominating candidates for the position of Superintendent to the Mayor, adopting rules and regulations for the department, and handling some disciplinary cases.

== See also ==
- Police authority
- Toronto Police Services Board
- Law enforcement in Canada
- Supervision of police personnel
