= Delta Police Department =

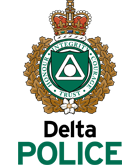
- Badge of the Delta Police Department (DPD)
- Abbreviation: DPD
- Motto: Honour, Integrity, Courage, Trust

Agency overview
- Formed: July 7, 1888
- Employees: 266
- Volunteers: 180+
- Annual budget: 35.981 million

Jurisdictional structure
- Operations jurisdiction: Delta, British Columbia, Canada
- Governing body: Delta Police Board
- Constituting instrument: BC Police Act
- General nature: Local civilian police

Operational structure
- Headquarters: 4455 Clarence Taylor Crescent
- Police Constables: 194
- Civilians: 72
- Elected officers responsible: The Honourable Jessy Sahota, Minister of Public Safety and Solicitor General of British Columbia; Ian Tait, Chair of the Delta Police Board
- Agency executive: Harj Sidhu, chief constable

Facilities
- Stations: 2: 4455 Clarence Taylor Crescent; 11375 84 Avenue

Website
- http://deltapolice.ca/

The Delta Police Department (DPD) is the police force for the City of Delta, British Columbia, a suburban community in Metro Vancouver with a population of 112,365. As of 2024, the Delta Police Department has an authorized strength of 205 sworn members and 85 civilian support staff, and an operating budget of $54,564,000.

In 2007, the DPD became responsible for policing the Tsawwassen First Nation through an agreement between the nation and the provincial and federal government. Under the Tsawwassen First Nation Final Agreement Act, the First Nation does not have the power to establish a police force on their own, but are able to do so by requesting the minister of public safety and solicitor general. The nation chose to employ the DPD to enforce its laws.

In 2024, the DPD was recognized as one of BC's top employers for the sixth consecutive year.

Delta is one of the safest cities in the Metro Vancouver area, according to Statistics Canada Data

The crime severity index in Delta is 63.9 index points, as per the latest statistics from 2023. It continues to be significantly lower than B.C. (104.1) and Canada (80.2). The crime severity index not only measures the amount of crime, but also the seriousness of each offense.

== History ==
The history of the Delta Police Department is closely tied to the first organized policing presence in British Columbia's history.

In 1858, Governor James Douglas appointed William Ladner as the first constable of New Caledonia. Ladner later went on to found the community of Ladner's Landing, which became the hub of the Municipality of Delta, British Columbia, on November 10, 1879.

On August 20, 1887, William McKee, the municipal clerk, was designated as a constable in addition to his duties as a clerk. On July 7, 1888, Joseph Jordan was appointed as Delta's first full-time constable, and with this appointment the Delta Municipal Police Department was formed. Over the next eight years Jordan was dismissed and re-appointed several times, depending on the department's needs and was assisted on occasion by other temporary constables.

By 1900, Jordan had been designated as the chief constable and worked full-time in this role until his retirement in 1911.

The chief constable's position remained the only regular full-time or part-time position until 1931, when the municipal council authorized the appointment of a night policeman. It was the duty of this policeman, whose salary was partly paid for by the local merchants, to patrol the streets of Ladner at night.

The 1950s was a decade of growth for the DPD as membership increased to 11 police officers, and the police station began operating on a 24-hour-a-day basis.

By 1971, the police department had grown to 45 police officers, due to the growth in community population after the opening of the George Massey Tunnel.

== Public confidence ==
Public confidence in Delta Police remains high, according to the results of a public survey, released by police in March, 2019. Residents are confident in the DPD's ability to deliver urgent services, but want officers to be more visible in the community.

Respondents thought the DPD did well in delivering urgent services in a timely manner; dealing with violent crime; having clear and transparent communication through strong social media programs; and consulting with the community to ensure the DPD is meeting their needs and expectations.

Seventy-four per cent of residents give a good to very good rating of officers they had contact with, and 80 per cent of people feel the Delta police do a good to very good job of delivering urgent services in a timely manner, well above the Canadian average.

== Recent high profile investigations ==
=== Brother's Keeper gang arrests ===
In February 2019, the DPD arrested three people associated with the Brother's Keepers gang, seizing weapons and "a significant quantity of drugs."

=== Attack on Acting Sergeant John Jasmins ===
In February 2019, Delta resident Manoj George was arrested after allegedly attacking a woman outside Immaculate Conception School in North Delta. Acting Sgt. John Jasmins, who was picking up his children from school, instructed his children to call 9-1-1 and intervened in the assault, tackling the man and receiving several stab wounds to the abdomen in the process. The woman was also stabbed several times. In September 2019, Acting Sgt. Jasmins was awarded a Chief Constable Commendation, the DPD's highest level of recognition, and in November 2019 he was presented with the Award of Valour, B.C.'s highest police honour.

=== Project Screaming Eagle ===
Delta Police arrested eight people and seized drugs, cash and a vehicle as a result of a two-month investigation into street sales of crystal meth. The investigation — dubbed Project Screaming Eagle — began when officers with the DPD’'s patrol support team doing proactive patrols in the area "noticed a trend of activity consistent with drug trafficking".

== Officer wellness – Bend Don't Break ==
In late 2018, the department launched a podcast called Bend, Don't Break, which shares the stories of first responders who have overcome significant adversity in their personal and professional lives.

Const. Jordan MacWilliams was among dozens of officers called to the Starlight Casino in New Westminster for reports of a distressed man armed with a gun who had taken his ex-girlfriend hostage. In the podcast, MacWilliams describes step-by-step the actions he says officers took during that standoff, from rescuing the victim to attempts at negotiation.

== On-duty deaths ==
On November 2, 1974, Staff Sergeant Ron McKay was shot and killed by Elery Long. On May 27, 1975, Long was convicted of murder and sentenced to death. On July 14, 1976, Long's death sentence, along with the death sentences of ten other people convicted of murdering peace officers, were converted to life sentences. In 2002 Long was granted full parole which has since been revoked following repeated contacts with police.

On April 8, 2000, Constable Mark Nieuwenhuis was killed in a police motorcycle accident. The investigation revealed that Nieuwenhuis was attempting to stop a vehicle at the time of the accident. A suspect has never been officially named.

== See also ==
- E-Comm, 9-1-1 call and dispatch centre for Southwestern BC
