= Medical Services Plan of British Columbia =

British Columbian health insurance program

- Abbreviation: MSP
- Formation: September 1, 1965; 61 years ago
- Type: Public health insurance program
- Headquarters: Victoria, British Columbia
- Region served: British Columbia
- Minister responsible: Josie Osborne
- Parent organization: Medical Services Commission
- Website: www2.gov.bc.ca/gov/content/health/health-drug-coverage/msp

The Medical Services Plan of British Columbia (MSP) is the province’s publicly funded, single-payer health insurance program that pays for medically necessary physician services and certain related benefits for eligible residents. MSP operates within the provincial Medicare Protection Act and the national principles of the Canada Health Act.

== History ==
British Columbia introduced a provincial medical plan on 1 September 1965 during the premiership of W. A. C. Bennett. The program was subsequently aligned with the federal Medical Care Act as the province joined the national Medicare framework in 1968.

== Administration ==
MSP is managed under the statutory authority of the Medical Services Commission (MSC), established by the Medicare Protection Act, which sets physician payment policy and administers the plan. Day-to-day beneficiary and claims administration are delivered through Health Insurance BC (HIBC). In 2022 the province awarded the HIBC services contract to Pacific Blue Cross’s affiliate PBC Solutions, with transition away from Maximus BC beginning that year. PBC Solutions would take on administration in spring 2023 and that operations would move to Central Saanich.

== Benefits ==
For eligible residents, MSP pays for medically required services provided by enrolled physicians and surgeons. It also covers dental or oral surgery performed in hospital when medically necessary, maternity care by physicians or registered midwives, and insured diagnostic procedures ordered by enrolled practitioners. Some optometry services are insured when medically necessary, while routine exams for adults are generally not covered.

== Funding and premiums ==
MSP premiums were cut by 50 percent on 1 January 2018 and fully eliminated on 1 January 2020. The province implemented an Employer Health Tax in 2019 as part of the funding transition. A planned premium increase announced earlier in 2016 was cancelled amid a pre-election fiscal update that redirected funds to housing affordability and other priorities.

== Claims processing and Teleplan ==
MSP’s electronic claims are transmitted through Teleplan. Teleplan lets practitioners submit claims and notes, check eligibility, and retrieve remittance information over an encrypted internet connection. The province reports that Teleplan processes over 9 million claims monthly, valued at approximately $330 million, and that about 98.8% of claims are processed within 30 days, with a majority paid within 14 days. Earlier Teleplan manuals reported lower volumes at the time, such as about 7.6 million monthly claims valued at around $300 million. The plan operates using twice-monthly payment timing and cut-off dates.

The province reports that MSP collaborates with the Medical Software Vendors Association on Teleplan specifications and changes. Teleplan specifications date to 1988, with successive technical updates through the 1990s.

== Administration and HIBC ==
Administrative operations for MSP and PharmaCare have been delivered under the Health Insurance BC (HIBC) banner since 1 April 2005, when Maximus BC assumed those functions under contract. The contract was extended in 2013, after which service delivery continued under HIBC. Accountability and privacy concerns have been raised related to outsourcing administration to Maximus following data breaches and lack of notable improvement.

== Policy and premium changes ==
On 16 September 2016, Finance Minister Michael de Jong announced the cancellation of a planned four percent increase to MSP premiums and the reallocation of funds toward housing affordability and other priorities, drawing extensive coverage and debate.

== Physician payment model and primary care attachment ==
From 2023 the province introduced the Longitudinal Family Physician (LFP) Payment Model to complement fee-for-service for community family practice. Independent reporting at launch and in early 2023 described a potential gross income near $385,000 for a full-time physician in the model, up from an estimated $250,000 under the old approach, with actual earnings depending on panel size, hours and complexity. A province-wide Health Connect Registry was expanded in 2023 to match residents with primary care providers, with independent outlets reporting rising match numbers through 2024.

== See also ==
- British Columbia Ambulance Service
- E-Comm, 9-1-1 call and dispatch centre for Southwestern BC
- Emergency Social Services
- HealthLink BC
- List of emergency organizations in British Columbia
