= DRR =

DRR may refer to:

== Organisations ==
- Directorate of Rice Research, former name of a rice research institute in India
- Dolly Rockit Rollers, roller derby league from Leicestershire, England
- Dreyer & Reinbold Racing, an American auto racing team
- Death Row Records, an American record label

== Science and technology ==
- Deficit round robin, a scheduling algorithm
- Domain-to-range ratio, in computer science
- Digitally reconstructed radiograph or CT scan, a medical imaging technique

== Other uses ==
- Disaster Response Route, emergency response road network in British Columbia, Canada
- Disaster risk reduction
- Disneyland Railroad, steam railroad attraction in Anaheim, California, US

== See also ==
- DRRS (disambiguation)
