= HealthLinkBC =

Canadian telehealth service

- Formation: 2001 (2008)
- Type: Government-Funded
- Purpose: To provide health information and advice to British Columbians
- Region served: British Columbia, Canada
- Official language: English with an additional option of 130 languages
- Parent organization: Ministry of Health (British Columbia)
- Website: HealthLinkBC.ca

HealthLinkBC is a government-funded telehealth service launched in 2001, which provides non-emergency health information to the residents of British Columbia, Canada through combined telephone, internet, mobile app, and print resources. HealthLink BC has two dedicated phone numbers 8-1-1 and 7-1-1 for deaf and hard of hearing callers.

Health service representatives assist callers with speaking to a registered nurse, dietitian or pharmacist about health related concerns or find health resources in their area. HealthLinkBC operates within the provincial Ministry of Health.

Translation services in 130 languages are available upon request.

== History ==
The organization was launched in 2001 as the BC HealthGuide Program by Ministry of Health (British Columbia). The program provides telephone triage and health information through integrated telephone, web and print resources. At its launch, it consisted of three main components: the BC HealthGuide Handbook, a medically approved handbook delivered to all B.C. households; a toll-free telephone line, staffed by registered nurses 24/7/365 who provide confidential health information and triage services over the telephone and a website, called BC HealthGuide Online, which provided a knowledge base of health information and provided links to other credible consumer health information sources and websites.

On November 21, 2008, the Executive Council of British Columbia launched a newly branded organization, HealthLink BC, along with its 8-1-1 number. This brought together all of the organization’s various services under a single brand and telephone number. These services include Nursing, Dietitian, Pharmacist and Navigation Services, "HealthLinkBC.ca" and "HealthLinkBC Files".

== Scope of service ==
HealthLink BC provides health information services to all regions of British Columbia via its website which contains BC-specific health information and a publicly available database of government-funded and not-for-profit health services and resources in British Columbia; its 8-1-1 telephone number; the BC HealthGuide Handbook, a printed handbook that contains information on common health topics, which is available in pharmacies and by mail; and the HealthLinkBC Files, a series of one-page health information sheets.

Public services

Health service representatives provide general health information, health resource referral information, and transfer calls to HealthLink BC’s professionals over the telephone 24 hours a day, 365 days a year. Registered nurses are available 24 hours a day to provide general and specific health information and advice including palliative care support over the telephone. Registered dietitians are available Monday to Friday 9 am – 5 pm to assist callers with dietary and nutrition questions over the telephone. Licensed pharmacists are available every day between 5 pm – 9 am to provide confidential information and advice on prescription and over-the-counter medications over the telephone.

The 'Trans Fat Information Line' is a specialized service which provides food industry workers with education and coaching on food handling practices to restrict trans fat. (This service was developed in response to B.C.’s 2009 legislation restricting the use of trans fats in the province’s food service establishments)

The BC HealthGuide Handbook is a 400+ page printed medical handbook available free-of-charge to residents of British Columbia. It provides information on common health topics such as how to recognize and cope with common health issues, illness prevention, home treatment and when to see a health professional. The Handbook is available in English, French, Chinese and Punjabi.

The HealthLinkBC Files are a series of health information sheets with B.C.-specific information on common health topics. A number of HealthLinkBC Files have been translated into other languages including: French, Chinese, Punjabi, Spanish, and Vietnamese. HealthLink BC also works with the Government of the Yukon to provide services to residents of the Yukon. Yukon residents have access to HealthLinkBC.ca and 8-1-1 and have been provided with a Yukon version of the HealthGuide handbook in English and French.

Professional services

'Call Transfer to 8-1-1’ provides access to 8-1-1 (using automated call transfer), and is offered to other B.C. health service delivery organizations who also use the phone to provide access to their service. Examples include: VCHA Newborn Hotline – after-hours, callers to the Hotline are automatically transferred to 8-1-1; BC Ambulance Service – when a call to 9-1-1 does not warrant the dispatch of an ambulance, callers are automatically transferred to 8-1-1; and, FHA Primary Health Care Office – after-hours, callers are automatically transferred to 8-1-1.

‘Customized 8-1-1’ refers to identified callers or groups that are provided customized services by utilizing 8-1-1 resources. Examples include: FHA Hospice Palliative Care – after-hours, clients call 8-1-1 and receive a customized service that supplements their ongoing palliative care program; and, Yukon Territory – when a caller accesses 8-1-1 from the Yukon, they receive a customized service that reflects the resources and services available to their locale.

== See also ==
- British Columbia Emergency Social Services
- E-Comm, 9-1-1 call and dispatch centre for Southwestern BC
- List of emergency organizations in British Columbia
- Medical Services Plan of British Columbia
