= Disaster Response Route =

Current DRR Sign (2004)

Disaster Response Route (DRR) is a network of pre-identified municipal and provincial roads in the Province of British Columbia, Canada, that can best move emergency services and supplies to where they are needed in the event of a major disaster. These roads are part of the Disaster Response Transportation(DRT) system and are intended for emergency responders when a disaster strikes and are not evacuation routes for the public.

== History ==
Original DRR Sign until 2004

DRR came to the province after witnessing the traffic mayhem following disasters like the 1989 San Francisco and 1994 Los Angeles earthquakes and the September 11 terrorist attacks. It was decided that BC will require a system to control post-disaster traffic and BC became the first jurisdiction in the world to implement a disaster response road plan in 1995. In the original plan, only roads in the Lower Mainland and Capital Regional District were considered, but in 2013 it was eventually expanded to marine routes, railways, and air transports.

DRR roads are capable of withstanding natural disasters, and the Lower Mainland roads all link to Abbotsford, more specifically to Abbotsford International Airport. While DRR consists mostly of roads, emergency plans also include marine routes suitable for quick access for responders.

There was confusion since the launch of the program with the general public—the original sign did not include the third tab (Emergency Vehicles Only During a Disaster), which led many to believe these roads are for evacuation when disaster strikes. Since 2004, the Ministry of Transportation added the third tab and increased public awareness to promote the correct use of these roads during a disaster.

== Operation ==
Roads that are pre-marked as DRR are open to the general public unless a state of emergency is declared by the municipal or provincial government. Once a state of emergency is declared, DRR can be activated and the local police will be responsible for cordoning off the roads. As soon as possible, the public will be allowed back onto the Disaster Response Routes.

DRR is intended for those who have the following function to access the roads within 72 hours of a disaster striking:

- Transport/diagnose/treat sick & injured
- Transport displaced persons
- Maintain law and order
- Extinguish fires & control hazards
- Control traffic & evacuations
- Search and Rescue
- Protect public health and prevent spread of communicable diseases
- Assess damage
- Restore damaged transportation systems
- Restore communications infrastructure
- Restore water/gas/electricity supplies
- Manage any of the above

Specifically, 'DRR users' are categorized into three groups:

- First Responders - designated responders
  - British Columbia Ambulance Service
  - Fire & Rescue
  - Police
  - Key management staff
- Critical Service Providers - designated responder for the duration of the emergency
  - Provincial Emergency Program volunteers
  - Hospital staff
  - Traffic controllers
  - Public Works personnel
  - Public Health officials
  - Utility (hydro, electricity, etc.) crews
- Specialist Responders - designated responder only when called upon and only when performing specific recovery-related tasks
  - Canadian Forces
  - Canadian Coast Guard
  - Structural engineer inspectors
  - Technicians
  - Supply delivery personnel
  - Maintenance crews

Once activated, only those who have been issued with proper authorization will be able to access the designated roads.

== See also ==
- Provincial Emergency Program
- Emergency Social Services
- E-Comm
