= Social services =

Range of public services

Social services are a range of public services intended to provide support and assistance towards particular groups, which commonly include the disadvantaged. They may be provided by individuals, private and independent organizations, or administered by a government agency. Social services are connected with the concept of welfare and the welfare state, as countries with large welfare programs often provide a wide range of social services. Social services are employed to address the wide range of needs of a society. Prior to industrialisation, the provision of social services was largely confined to private organisations and charities, with the extent of its coverage also limited. Social services are now generally regarded globally as a 'necessary function' of society and a mechanism through which governments may address societal issues.

The provision of social services by governments is linked to the belief of universal human rights, democratic principles, as well as religious and cultural values. The availability and coverage of social services varies significantly within societies. The main groups which social services is catered toward are: families, children, youths, elders, women, the sick, and disabled people. Social services consists of facilities and services such as: public education, welfare, infrastructure, mail, libraries, social work, food banks, universal health care, police, fire services, public transport and public housing.

== Characteristics ==
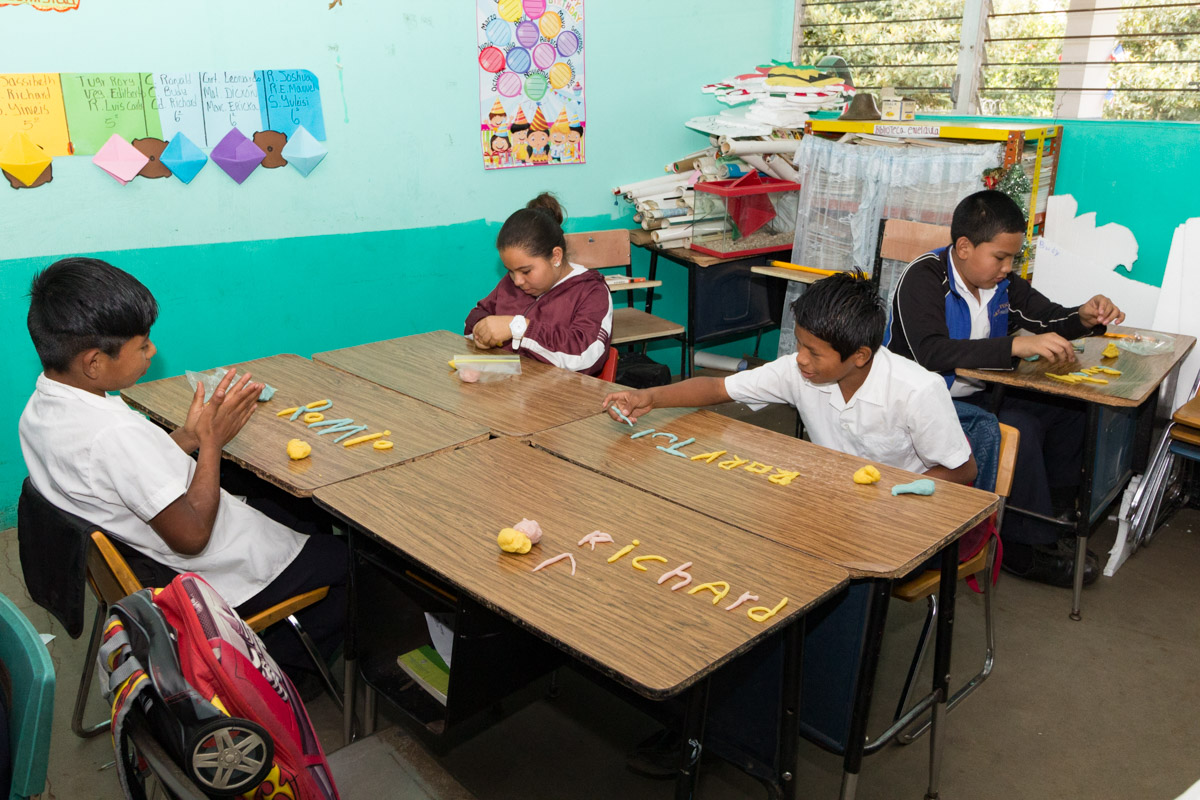
The provision of education services is an example of a social service.

The term 'social services' is often substituted with other terms such as social welfare, social protection, social assistance, social care and social work, with many of the terms overlapping in characteristics and features. What is considered a 'social service' in a specific country is determined by its history, cultural norms, political system and economic status. The most central aspects of social services include education, health services, housing programs, and transport services. Social services can be both communal and individually based. This means that they may be implemented to provide assistance to the community broadly, such as economic support for unemployed citizens, or they may be administered specifically considering the need of an individual – such as foster homes. Social services are provided through a variety of models. Some of these models include:

- The Scandinavian model: based on the principles within 'universalism'. This model provides significant aid to disadvantaged groups such as people with disabilities and is administered through the local government with limited contributions from non-governmental organisations.
- The family care model: employed throughout the Mediterranean, this model relies on the aid of individuals and families which usually work with clergy, as well as that of NGOs such as the Red Cross.
- The means-tested model: employed in the UK and Australia, the government provides support but has stringent regulations and checks which it employs to determine who is entitled to receive social services or assistance.

=== Recipients ===
Social services may be available to the entirety of the population, such as the police and fire services, or they may be available to only specific groups or sections of society. Some examples of social service recipients include elderly people, children and families, people with disabilities, including both physical and mental disabilities. These may extend to drug users, young offenders and refugees and asylum seekers depending on the country and its social service programs, as well as the presence of non-governmental organisations.

== History ==
=== Early developments ===
The development of social services increased significantly in the last two decades of the nineteenth century in Europe. There are a number of factors that contributed to the development of social services in this period. These include: the impacts of industrialisation and urbanisation, the influence of Protestant thought regarding state responsibility for welfare, and the growing influence of trade unions and the labour movement.

==== Europe (1833–1914) ====
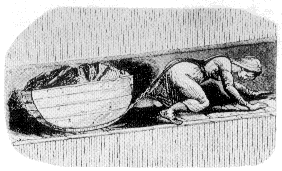
Illustration of industrial-era child labour, depicting a girl pulling coal up a mineshaft. The Factory Laws and labor movements in the late nineteenth century aimed at limiting and ending child labour in Europe.

In the nineteenth century, as countries industrialised further, the extent of social services in the form of labour schemes and compensation expanded. The expansion of social services began following Britain's legislation of the 1833 Factory Act. The legislation set limits on the minimum age of children working, preventing children younger than nine years of age from working. Additionally, the Act set a limit of 48 working hours per week for children aged 9 to 13, and for children aged 13 to 18 it was set at 12 hours per day. The Act also was the first legislation requiring compulsory schooling within Britain. Another central development for the existence of social services was Switzerland's legislation of the Factory Act in 1877. The Factory Act introduced limitations on working hours, provided maternity benefits and provided workplace protections for children and young adults. In Germany, Otto von Bismarck also introduced a large amount of social welfare legislation in this period. Mandatory sickness insurance was introduced in 1883, with workplace accident insurance enacted in 1884 alongside old age and invalidity schemes in 1889. Insurance laws of this kind were emulated in other European countries afterwards, with Sweden enacting voluntary sickness insurance in 1892, Denmark in 1892, Belgium in 1894, Switzerland in 1911, and Italy in 1886. Additionally, Belgium, France and Italy enacted legislation subsidising voluntary old-age insurance in this period. By the time the Netherlands introduced compulsory sickness insurance in 1913, all major European countries had introduced some form of insurance scheme.

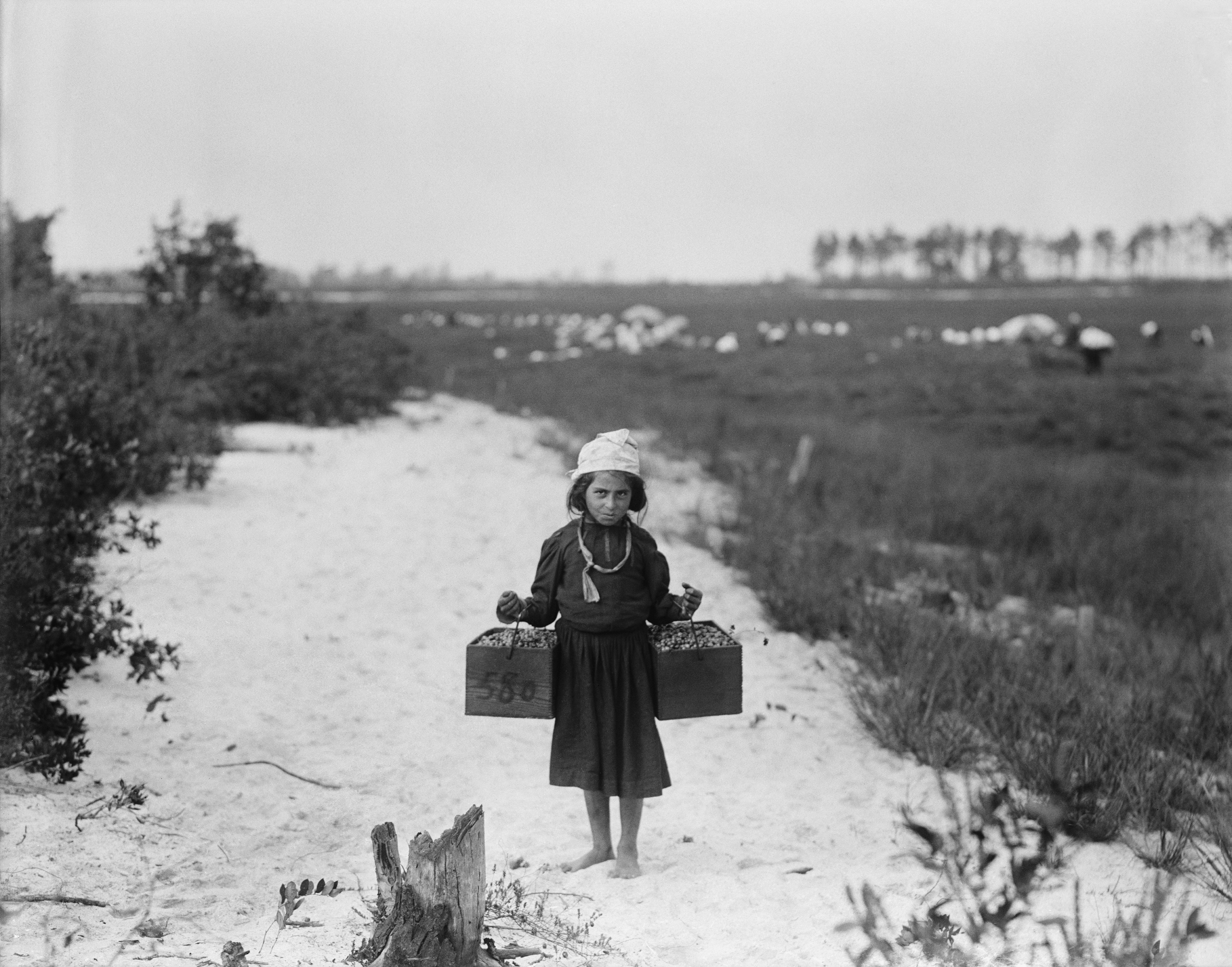
A photograph of a 10-year-old girl in 1912 employed in child labour. Through the passage Factory Acts, the severity and commonality of child labour decreased.

==== South America (1910–1960) ====
According to Carmelo Meso-Lago, social services and welfare systems within South America developed in three separate stages, with three groups of countries developing at different rates. The first group, consisting of Argentina, Brazil, Chile, Costa Rica and Uruguay, developed social insurance schemes in the late 1910s and the 1920s. The notable schemes, which had been implemented by 1950, consisted of work injury insurance, pensions, and sickness and maternity insurance. The second group, consisting of Bolivia, Colombia, Ecuador, Mexico, Panama, Paraguay, Peru and Venezuela, implemented these social services in the 1940s. The extent to which these programs and laws were implemented were less extensive than the first group. In the final group, consisting of the Dominican Republic, El Salvador, Guatemala, Haiti, Honduras and Nicaragua, social services programmes were implemented in the 1950s and 1960s, with the least coverage out of each group. With the exception of Nicaragua, social service programs are not available for unemployment insurance or family allowances. Average expenditure on social services programs in as a percentage of GDP in these states is 5.3%, which is significantly lower than that of Europe and North America.

==== Asia (1950–2000) ====
Japan's economic expenditure on core social services post WWII, sourced from the Japanese Government's Ministry of Health, Labor and Welfare

Within Asia, the significant development of social services first began in Japan after the conclusion of World War II. Due to rising levels of social inequality in the 1950s following the reformation of the Japanese economy, the incumbent Liberal Democratic Party legislated extensive health insurance laws in 1958 and pensions in 1959 to address societal upheaval. In Singapore, a compulsory superannuation scheme was introduced in 1955. Within Korea, voluntary health insurance was made available in 1963 and mandated in 1976. Private insurance was only available to citizens employed by large corporate firms, while a separate insurance plans were provided to Civil Servants and military personnel. In Taiwan, the Kuomintang government in 1953 propagated a healthcare inclusive workers insurance programme. A separate insurance scheme for bureaucrats and the military was also provided in Korea in this time. In 1968, Singapore increased its social services program to include public housing, and expanding this further in 1984 to include medical care. Within both Korea and Taiwan, by the 1980s the number of workers that were covered by labour insurance had not increased above 20%.

Following domestic political upheaval within Asian countries in the 1980s, the availability social services considerably increased in the region. In 1988 in Korea, health insurance was granted to self-employed rural workers, with coverage extended to urban-based self-employed workers in 1989. Additionally, a national pension program was initiated. Within Taiwan, an extensive national health insurance system was enacted in 1994 and implemented in 1995. During this period the Japanese government also expanded social services for children and the elderly, providing increased support services, increasing funding to care facilities and organisations, and legislating new insurance programs. In the 1990s, Shanghai introduced a housing affordability program which was then later expanded to include all of China. In 2000, Hong Kong introduced a superannuation scheme policy, with China implementing a similar policy soon after.

== Types ==
- Healthcare
- Education
- Police
- Labour Laws
- Fire Services
- Insurance laws
- Food banks
- Charitable Organisations
- Public housing
- Aged Care
- Disability Services
- Legal aid
- Youth Services
- Crisis Support Services
- Emergency Relief
- Public transportation

== Impacts ==
=== Quality of life ===
There have been several findings which indicate that social services have a positive impact upon the quality of life of individuals. An OECD study in 2011 found that the countries with the highest ratings were Denmark, Norway, Sweden and Finland, while the lowest ratings were given by people from Estonia, Portugal and Hungary. Another study recorded by the Global Barometer of Happiness in 2011 found similar results. Both of these studies indicated that the most important aspects of quality of life to people were health, education, welfare and the cost of living. Additionally, the countries with the perception of high-quality public services, specifically Finland, Sweden, Norway, Denmark and the Netherlands, scored the highest on levels of happiness. Conversely, Bulgaria, Romania, Lithuania and Italy, who scored low on levels of satisfaction of social services, had low levels of happiness, with some sociologists arguing this indicates there is a strong correlation between happiness and social services.

=== Poverty ===
Research indicates that welfare programs, which are included as a part of social services, have a considerable impact upon poverty rates in countries in which welfare expenditure accounts for over 20% of their GDP.

However, the impact of social service programs on poverty varies depending on the service. One paper conducted within China indicates that social services in the form of direct financial assistance does not have a positive impact on the reduction of poverty rates. The paper also stated that the provision of public services in the form of medical insurance, health services and hygiene protection have a 'significantly positive' impact upon the reduction of poverty.

The absolute poverty rates of various countries before and after their introduction of welfare

The relative poverty rates before and after the introduction of welfare of various countries

Poverty levels pre- and post-welfare
Country	Absolute poverty rate (1960–1991) (threshold set at 40% of United States median household income)		Relative poverty rate (1970–1997)	
Country	Pre-welfare	Post-welfare	Pre-welfare	Post-welfare
Sweden	23.7	5.8	14.8	4.8
Norway	9.2	1.7	12.4	4.0
Netherlands	22.1	7.3	18.5	11.5
Finland	11.9	3.7	12.4	3.1
Denmark	26.4	5.9	17.4	4.8
Germany	15.2	4.3	9.7	5.1
Switzerland	12.5	3.8	10.9	9.1
Canada	22.5	6.5	17.1	11.9
France	36.1	9.8	21.8	6.1
Belgium	26.8	6.0	19.5	4.1
Australia	23.3	11.9	16.2	9.2
United Kingdom	16.8	8.7	16.4	8.2
United States	21.0	11.7	17.2	15.1
Italy	30.7	14.3	19.7	9.1

=== Expenditure on social welfare programs ===
The table below displays the welfare spending of countries as a percentage of their total GDP. The statistics are sourced from the Organisation for Economic Co-operation and Development.

Welfare spending of countries as percentage of total GDP
Rank	Country	2019	2016	2010	2005	2000
1	France	31.2	31.5	30.7	28.7	27.5
2	Belgium	28.9	29.0	28.3	25.3	23.5
3	Finland	28.7	30.8	27.4	23.9	22.6
4	Denmark	28.0	28.7	28.9	25.2	23.8
5	Italy	15.9	28.9	27.6	24.1	22.6
6	Austria	26.6	27.8	27.6	25.9	25.5
7	Sweden	26.1	27.1	26.3	27.4	26.8
8	Germany	25.1	25.3	25.9	26.3	25.4
9	Norway	25.0	25.1	21.9	20.7	20.4
10	Spain	23.7	24.6	25.8	20.4	19.5
11	Greece	23.5	27.0	23.8	20.4	18.4
12	Portugal	22.6	24.1	24.5	22.3	18.5
13	Luxembourg	22.4	21.8	22.9	22.4	18.6
14	South Africa	30		20.7	20.0	19.4
15	Japan	21.9				
16	Slovenia	21.2	22.8	23.4	21.4	22.4
17	Poland	21.1	20.2	20.6	20.9	20.2
18	United Kingdom	20.6	21.5	22.8	19.4	17.7
19	Hungary	19.4	20.6	23.0	21.9	20.1
20	New Zealand	18.9				
21	Czech Republic	18.7	19.4	19.8	18.1	18.0
22	United States	18.7	19.3	19.3	15.6	14.3
23	Estonia	18.4	17.4	18.3	13.0	13.8
24	Australia	17.8	19.1	16.7	16.7	18.2
25	Canada	17.3				
26	Slovakia	17.0	18.6	18.1	15.8	17.6
27	Netherlands	16.7	22.0	22.1	20.5	18.4
28	Latvia	16.2	14.5	18.7	12.2	14.8
29	Lithuania	16.2				
30	Israel	16.0	16.1	16.0	16.3	17.0
31	Switzerland	16.0	19.7	18.4	18.4	16.3
32	Iceland	16.0	15.2	17.0	15.9	14.6
33	Ireland	14.4	16.1	22.4	14.9	12.6
34	Turkey	12.5				
35	South Korea	11.1	10.4	8.3	6.1	4.5
36	Chile	10.9				

The above graph displays social spending as a percentage of yearly GDP in OECD countries in 2015. The topmost graph displays spending on social services as a percentage of yearly GDP in OECD countries from the period between 1880 and 2016.

=== Health services ===
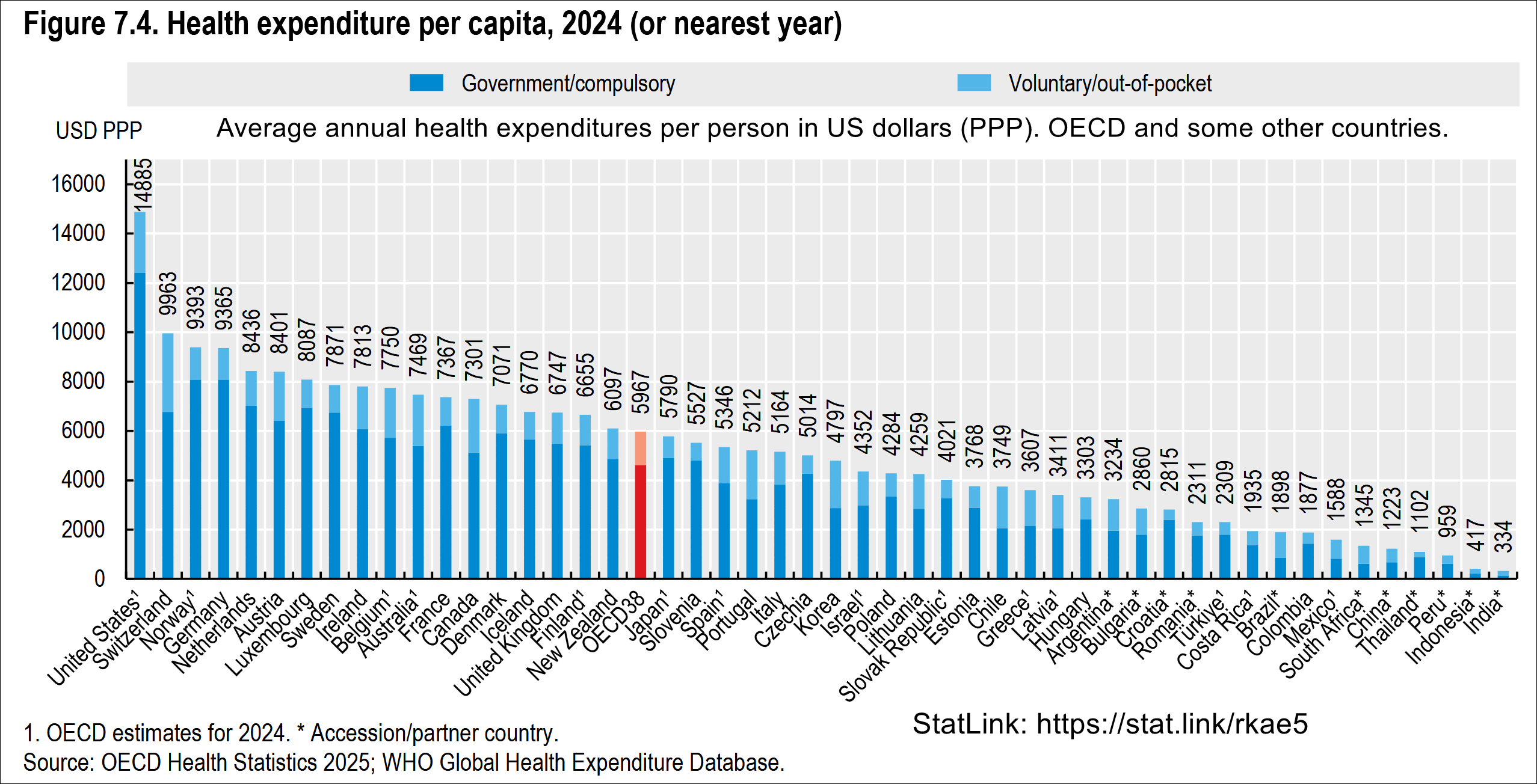
Total healthcare cost per person. Public and private spending. US dollars PPP. $6,319 for Canada in 2022. $12,555 for the US in 2022.

According to the World Health Organization (WHO), the provision of health services is a significant factor in ensuring that individuals are able to maintain their health and wellbeing. The WHO identifies 16 health services that must be provided by countries to ensure that universal health coverage is achieved. These are classified under four categories: reproductive, maternal and children health services, infectious diseases, 'noncommunicable' diseases, and basic access to medical services. OECD data reveals that the provision of universal health coverage leads to significantly positive outcomes on society. This includes a positive correlation between life expectancy and the provision of health services and a negative relationship between life expectancy and countries which's social service programs do not provide universal healthcare coverage. Additionally, the density of the provision of healthcare services by the government is positively associated with increases in life expectancy.

=== Children ===
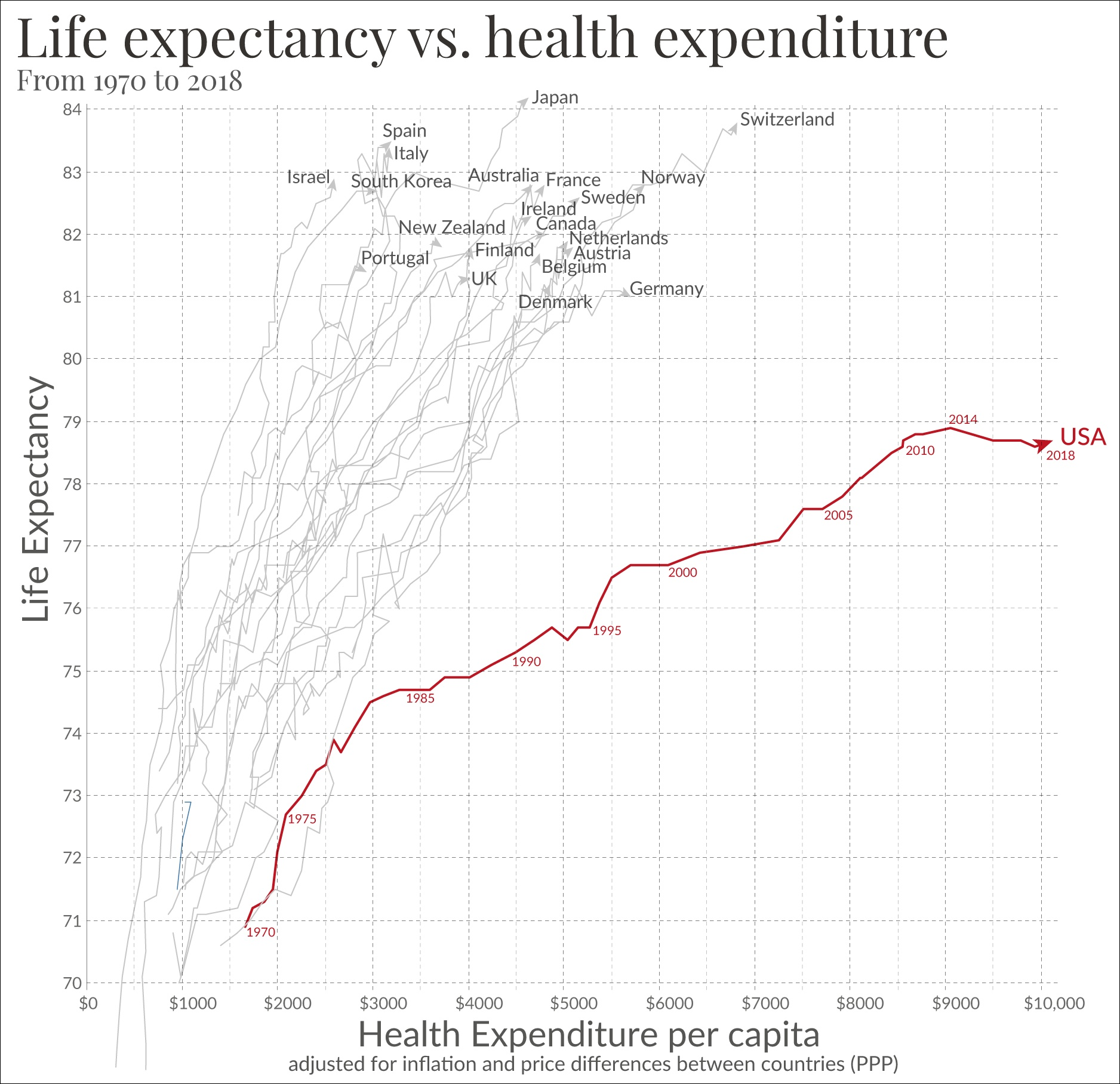
This graph displays, adjusted for inflation and PPP price differences between countries, the relationship between life expectancy and healthcare expenditure. US average of $10,447 in 2018. The US does not provide a universal health care program, but introduced the Affordable Care Act in 2010. For more, see Healthcare in the United States.

Within the area of child welfare, social services aim to provide help to children and their families, while providing mechanisms to ensure they are able to live safe, stable lives with a permanent home. In the United States, 3 million children are maltreated each year, with the overall economic costs of child maltreatment totalling up to US$80 billion annually. Social service programs cost the US$29 billion USD on child maltreatment prevention and child welfare services. According to researchers, social service programs are effective in reducing maltreatment and reducing overall economic costs to society, however the effectiveness of these programs are significantly reduced when they are not correctly implemented, or when these programs are not implemented together. The issues in which social services attempt at preventing for children include substance abuse, underemployment and unemployment, homelessness and criminal convictions. Social service programs within this area include family preservation, kinship care, foster and residential care.

=== Women ===
Empirical evidence suggests that social service programs have had a significant impact upon the employment of single mothers. Following 1996 welfare reform in the US, employment rates among single mothers have increased considerably from 60% in 1994 to 72% in 1999. Social services, particularly education, are considered by UNICEF as an effective method through which to combat gender inequality. Social services such as education may be employed to overcome discrimination and challenge gender norms. Social services, notably educational programs and aid provided by organisations such as UNICEF, are also essential in providing women strategies and tools to prevent and respond to domestic and family violence. Other examples of social services which may help address this issue include the police, welfare services, counselling, legal aid and healthcare.

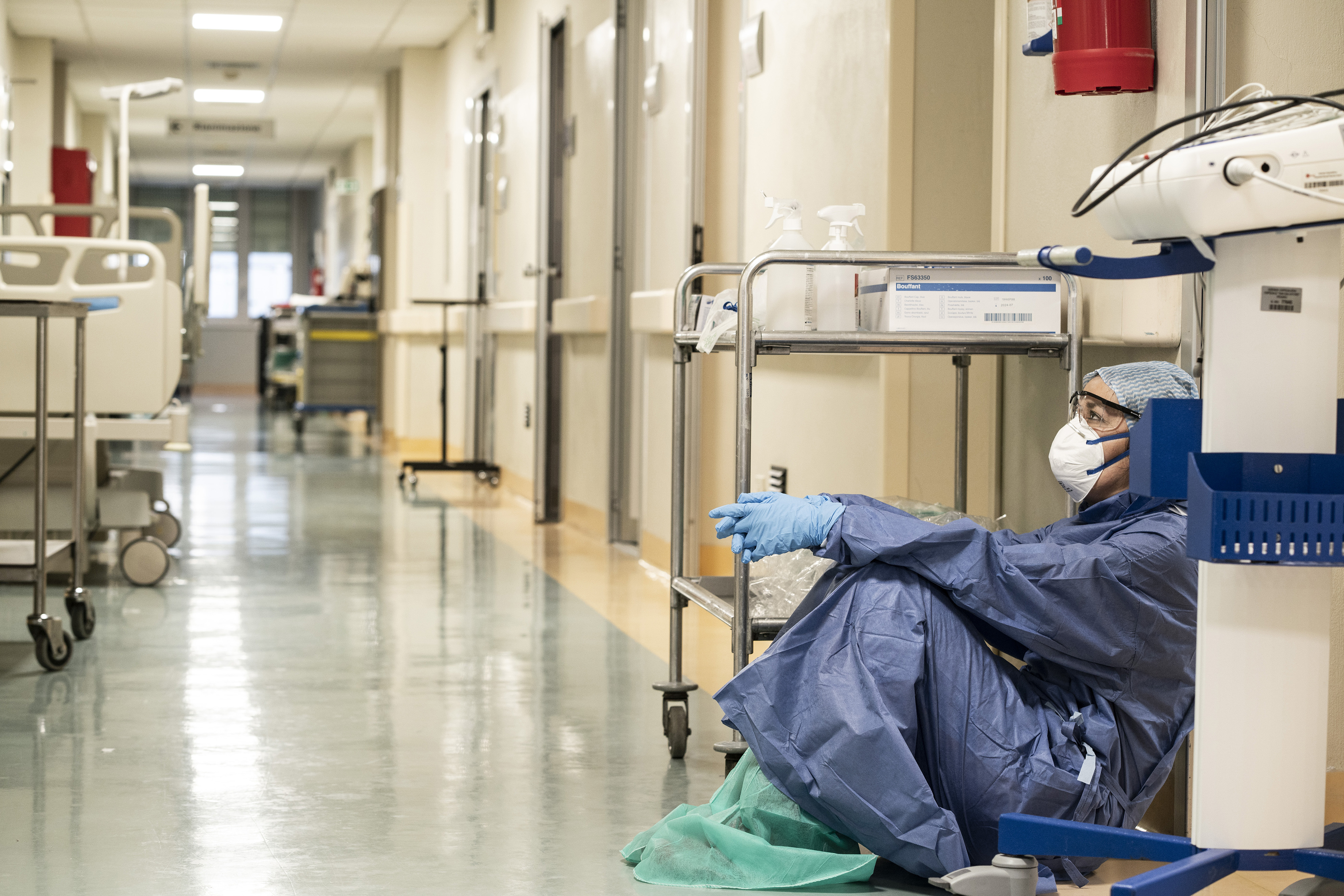
A photograph of a doctor in 2020 in the midst of the coronavirus outbreak. Social services and social workers played a central role in the response to the pandemic.

=== COVID-19 ===
Social services have played a central role in the global response to the COVID-19 pandemic. Healthcare workers, public officials, teachers, social welfare officers and other public servants have provided critical services in containing the pandemic and ensuring society functions. The impact of the pandemic was compounded by the shortage of social services globally, with the world requiring six million more nurses and midwives to achieve the goals set within the Sustainable Development Goals at the time of the outbreak. Social services, such as education, have been required to adapt to changing social conditions while still providing essential services. Social services have expanded worldwide through the introduction of economic stimulus packages, with governments globally committing US$130 billion as of June 2020 to manage the pandemic.

== See also ==
- Australian referendum, 1946 (Social Services)
- Child Protective Services (US)
- Department of Social Services (US)
- Department for Communities and Local Government (UK)
- Emergency Social Services
- Human services
- International Social Services
- Ministry of Community and Social Services (Ontario)
- New York State Social Services Department
- Precariat
- Secretary of State for Communities and Local Government (UK)
- Social policy
- Social Welfare (constituency)
