= DRRS =

DRRS may refer to:

- Defense Readiness Reporting System
- Duane-radial ray syndrome
- Domain Revenue Recovery Services, Inc.
- The Doodlebops Rockin' Road Show, a spinoff series to The Doodlebops.
