= Ministry of Emergency Management and Climate Readiness =

Provincial government department in Canada

Ministry of Emergency Management and Climate Readiness (British Columbia)
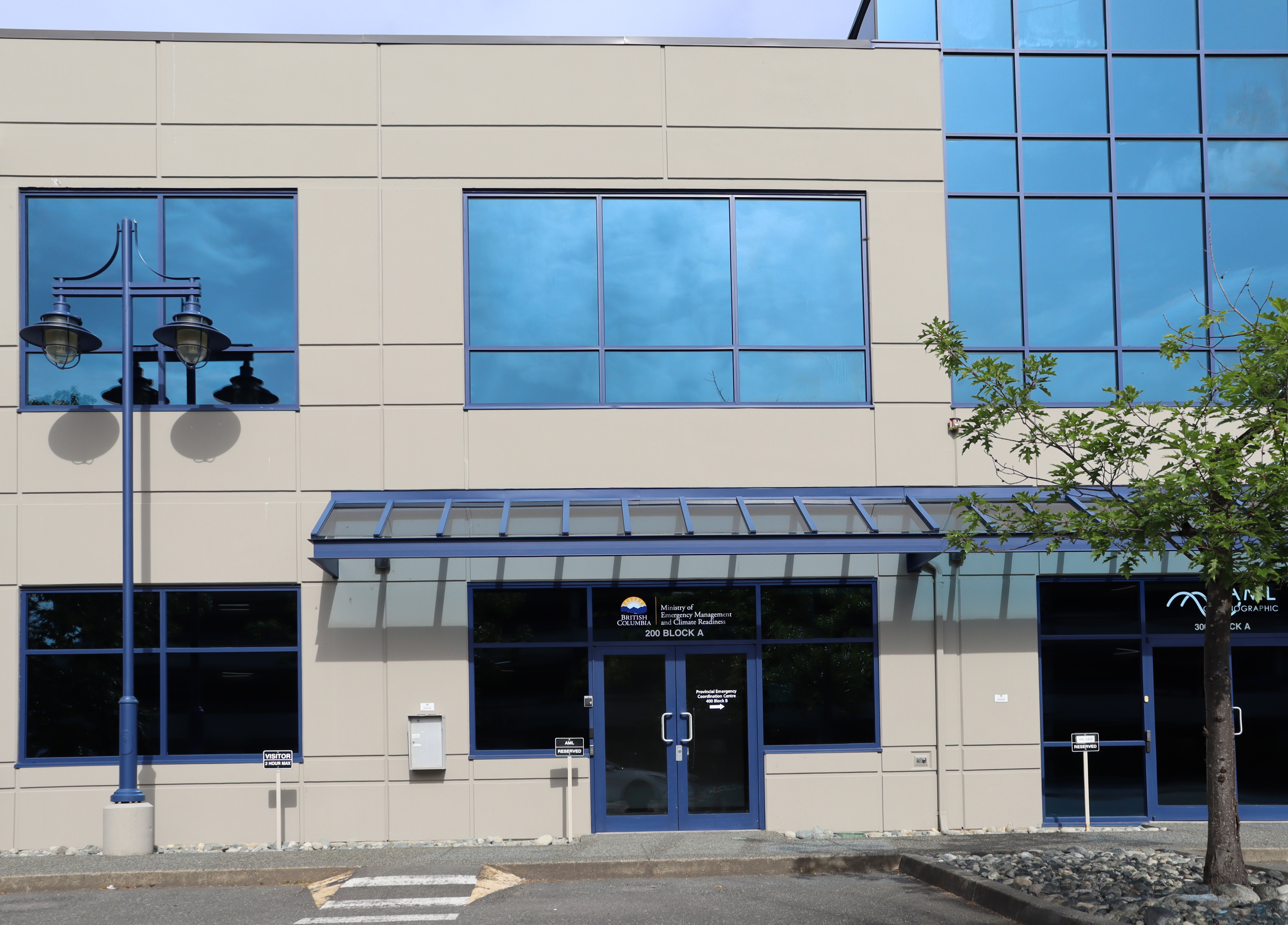

Agency overview
- Formed: 2022
- Jurisdiction: Province of British Columbia
- Headquarters: Victoria, British Columbia
- Minister responsible: The Honourable Kelly Greene, Minister of Emergency Management and Climate Readiness
- Agency executive: Teresa Dobmeier, Deputy Minister

The Ministry of Emergency Management and Climate Readiness (EMCR), formerly Emergency Management BC (EMBC), is a provincial government department in the Canadian province of British Columbia. EMCR works with local governments and other provincial and federal agencies year round, providing coordination and support before, during and after emergencies. EMCR is administered under the B.C. Emergency and Disaster Management Act.

EMCR has its headquarters in Victoria, British Columbia, and incorporates six regional offices throughout the province in Surrey, Kamloops, Nelson, Terrace, Prince George and Victoria.

The current minister is Kelly Greene.

== British Columbia Emergency Management System ==
The Province of British Columbia has developed and adopted the British Columbia Emergency Management System (BCEMS).

BCEMS is a comprehensive emergency management system based on the Incident Command System (ICS). This supports a coordinated and organized response and recovery to all emergency incidents and disasters.

== Emergency management planning and response ==
Multi-agency hazard plans for B.C. are prepared and updated regularly by the province to ensure an effective strategy is in place to address many possible types of emergencies and disasters. These plans foster cooperation among multiple organizations. They focus on public safety, infrastructure and property protection and management of the aftermath of events.

British Columbia's comprehensive emergency management system promotes a coordinated and organized response to all emergency incidents and disasters. The structure provides the framework for a standardized emergency response in the province.

At the most fundamental level, it is up to the individual to know about the risks in their region and what to do in an emergency to protect themselves and their family. Everyone should be aware of the importance of Personal Emergency Preparedness.

Local governments lead the initial response to emergencies and disasters in their communities. They have emergency plans and maintain an emergency management organization to support the actions of first responders.

The provincial emergency management structure is activated when a B.C. community or any significant infrastructure is threatened by an emergency or disaster that may require additional or specialized resources.

== Disaster Financial Assistance ==
British Columbia has a program to help those impacted by a disaster cope with the cost of repairs and recovery from disaster-related property damage.

The Disaster Financial Assistance Program (DFA) is administered through EMCR under the authority of the Compensation and Disaster Financial Assistance Regulation.

Those impacted by a disaster may apply to the province for Disaster Financial Assistance (DFA) where the losses could not be insured or where other programs are not available. Disaster financial assistance helps to replace or restore essential items and property that have been destroyed or damaged to pre-disaster condition.

Assistance is available to qualifying home owners, residential tenants, small businesses, farm operators, and not-for-profit charitable organizations.

== Public safety ==
About 13,000 people across the province volunteer their time and expertise in preparing for and responding to emergency situations. EMCR provides support for many volunteers and also provides the essential legal authority to recognized volunteer groups in responding to emergencies and disasters. Registered public safety lifeline volunteers are eligible for some benefits and basic response expenses. There is additional support available in the way of coordination and training

Emergency volunteers come from every corner of the province and from all walks of life. Public safety lifeline volunteers respond to an average of 6,000 incidents a year, in all kinds of weather, any place, any time.

=== Emergency Support Services ===
Emergency Support Services (previously known as Emergency Social Services) provides short-term assistance to British Columbians who are forced to leave their homes because of fire, floods, earthquakes or other emergencies. This assistance includes food, lodging, clothing, emotional support and family reunification

=== Ground Search and Rescue ===
Annually, Search and Rescue (SAR) volunteers in BC respond to over 1000 searches province-wide. Volunteer responders donate over 120,000 hours of their time on callouts and recent statistics show an astounding 95% of the subjects were found

Search and rescue is further broken down into individual teams what operate in an area of the province where they are responsible for familiarity and access (e.g., North Shore Rescue). They may be tasked from a variety of agencies such as the Royal Canadian Mounted Police, local police force, BC Ambulance, or the Coroner's service, and can be called to assist the Coast Guard, Department of National Defence, and Parks Canada. A number of search and rescue teams in BC are also trained and equipped for using the Helicopter Flight Rescue System to aid in rescuing people from dangerous or remote terrain.

In 2005 there were 93 individual SAR teams in the province, comprising approximately 4700 volunteers, and conducting an average of 900 operations per year, locating an average of 1200 people per year.

EMBC-affiliated ground SAR teams in BC are represented by the British Columbia Search and Rescue Association, as well as by their individual teams.

=== Royal Canadian Marine Search and Rescue ===
In 2017, EMBC signed a memorandum of understanding with the Royal Canadian Marine Search and Rescue (RCMSAR), which allows for provincial and local response agencies to access humanitarian assistance from RCMSAR in coastal and inland waterways. As a core function, RCMSAR responds to over 800 SAR missions annually from its 33 volunteer lifeboat stations. RCMSAR comprises over 1,100 volunteers and a small cadre of paid staff.

=== Provincial Emergency Program Air Search & Rescue ===
PEP Air's primary function is to assist Canadian Forces during search and rescue missions when additional resources are required. Currently, the organization includes over 100 aircraft crewed by more than 700 pilots, spotters and navigators.p

=== BC Road Rescue Service ===
BC Road Rescue is an organized service with members who may be requested to provide support to people involved in out-of-jurisdiction motor vehicle accidents where specialized skills and equipment are required.

=== Emergency radio communications ===
During disasters and other serious emergency situations, when many other systems fail, a proven reliable means of communication has been emergency radio communications, notably Amateur Radio or "ham" radio. Emergency radio is a public safety lifeline that assists within the community and links the community in crisis to where relief and support can be coordinated.

=== Volunteers' powers, privileges and recognition ===
- Volunteers are allowed to use the Disaster Response Route when on duty.
- Provision has been made within the B.C. Emergency and Disaster Management Act (Bill 31) to ensure the compliance by all those given orders and directions arising from use of this act. The EDMA received Royal Assent on November 8, 2023.
- Civil liability exemption under the B.C. Emergency and Disaster Management Act (Bill 31) and WorkSafeBC coverage are both provided for any Public Safety Lifeline Volunteers. Section 30 of Bill 31 provides more detail.
- B.C.’s Good Samaritan Act applies to all volunteers (unless grossly negligent).
- Training from the provincial, regional and municipal governments.
- Special annual awards night.
- SAR training program administration and coordination through a grant of $250K to the Justice Institute of BC.

== See also ==
- Interagency Volcanic Event Notification Plan
- E-Comm
