= Department of Social Services =

Department of Social Services may refer to:

- Alternative name for Child Protective Services in some U.S. jurisdictions
- Department of Social Services (Australia)
  - Department of Social Services (1939–72), defunct Australian government department
- Department of Social Services (Bangladesh)
