= Defense Readiness Reporting System =

The National Defense Authorization Act for Fiscal Year 1999 (NDAA 1999) added Section 117 to United States Code Title 10, which directed the Secretary of Defense to establish a "comprehensive readiness reporting system" that would "measure in an objective, accurate, and timely manner" the capability of the U.S. military to carry out the National Security Strategy, Defense Planning Guidance, and the National Military Strategy.

== Study ==
Additionally, the National Defense Authorization Act for Fiscal Year 2000 (NDAA 2000) directed an independent study of the requirements for this comprehensive readiness reporting system, resulting in an Institute for Defense Analyses report titled "Independent Review of DOD's Readiness Reporting System" released in November 2000.

The overarching intent behind the Defense Readiness Reporting System (DRRS) is to help answer the question "ready for what?" by providing both capability and resource data in an improved readiness reporting tool to broaden DoD-level readiness assessments.

== Intentions ==
DRRS represents a shift in how the Defense Department:

Thinks of readiness

- Beyond narrow resource accounting
- Synonymous with capability—What can forces do?
- In the context of assigned missions

Measures force status

- Focus on forces and missions
- Includes Joint, support, operational units, and Combat Support Agencies

Assesses risk

- Uses collaborative tools linked to near-real time data
- Requires operational context based on assigned mission

Responds to deficiencies

- Builds in the identification of mitigation strategies
- Considers readiness reporting, risk assessment and adaptive planning as one large, iterative process

DRRS is mission focused ...

Detailed views of unit personnel and equipment

- Insights in force “availability”
- Includes Joint organizations
- Includes installations, facilities, ranges
- Informs risk mitigation/Alternative Course of Action analysis

DRRS enables and supports Global Force Management while maintaining an inventory of individuals who possess special skills.

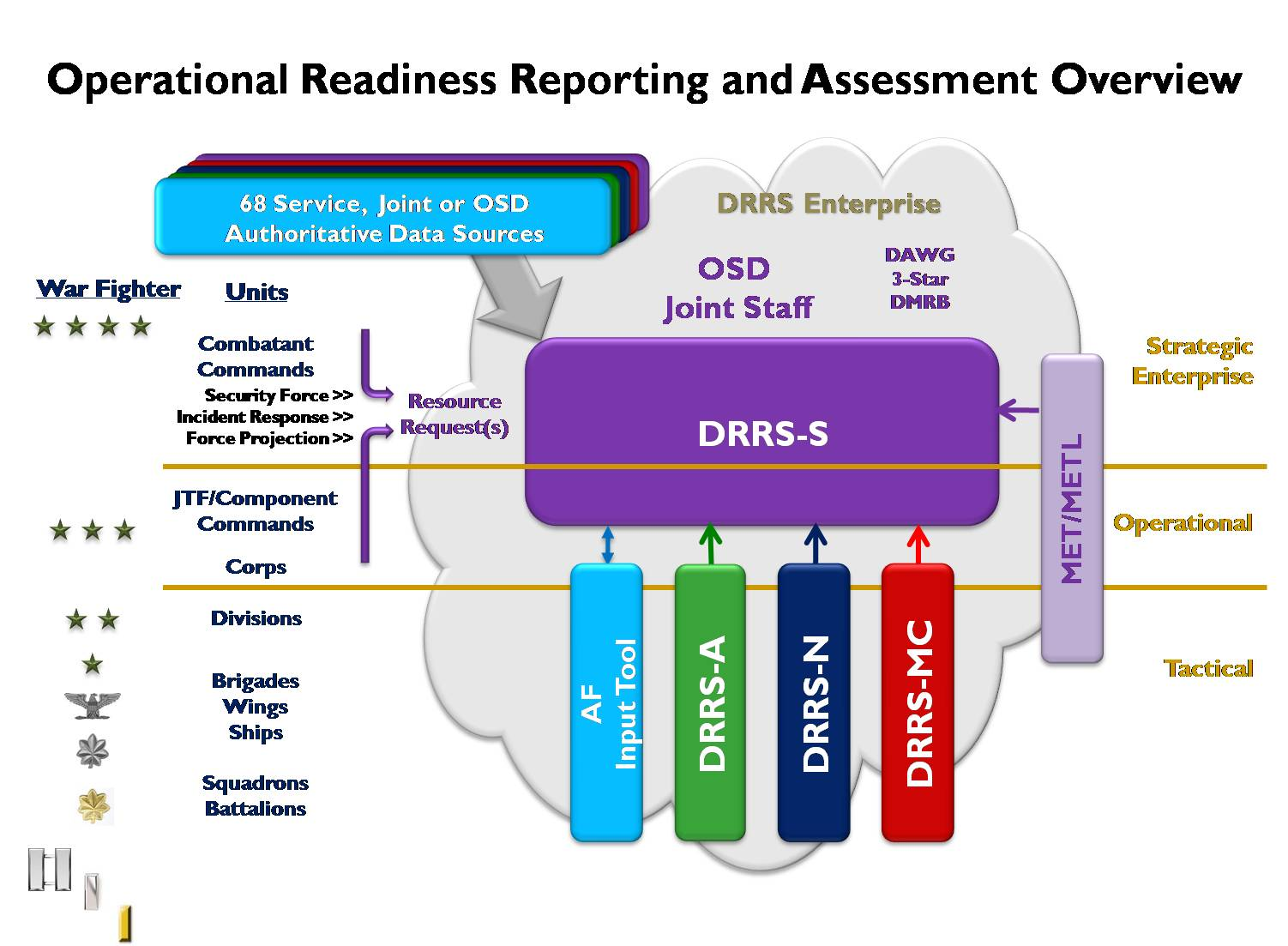
Operational Readiness Reporting and Assessment Overview
