= Emergency Support Services =

Emergency Support Services (formerly known as Emergency Social Services) (ESS) is a component of Emergency Management British Columbia. As of March 2023, EMBC became part of the B.C. Ministry of Emergency Management and Climate Readiness ESS are those services required to preserve the well-being of people affected by an emergency or disaster. Teams are established in local municipalities and assemble together for meetings and contingency planning.

== Provisions ==
Although ESS is designed to provide services to individuals affected by large complex disasters or emergencies, ESS may also be provided during smaller emergencies; for example, a single house fire or emergencies affecting 1 to 2 families in a community.

ESS provides temporary relief to individuals and families so they can begin to plan their next steps to recover after a disaster.

ESS provides primary services such as: food, lodging, clothing, family reunification. It may also provide specialized services such as: emotional support services; first aid; child minding; pet care; and transportation services.

ESS teams assist people affected by disaster, usually at Reception Centres which may be located at the local community centre, recreation centre, church, or school.

ESS teams may also provide services in the following settings: outreach services to those unable to leave their homes; mass care (lodging and feeding) to evacuees during a major disaster; on-site services to response workers and others.

== Regions ==
British Columbia is Canada's third largest province, and its most mountainous. EMBC divides the province into regions for manageability reasons.

- Vancouver Island Region: covers the Island, and much of the coastal region of the corresponding mainland including the following regions:
  - Victoria Capital
  - Cowichan Valley
  - Nanaimo
  - Alberni - Clayoquot
  - Powell River
  - Comox - Strathcona
  - Mount Waddington
- South West region: is the most populated, and includes the Lower Mainland and the Fraser Valley, and it includes
  - Sunshine Coast
  - Squamish - Lillooet (but not including the communities of: Birken, Bralorne, Gold Bridge, Pavilion, Lillooet, Seton Portage, Shalalth)
- Central Region: takes in the Thompson-Okanagan area and parts of the Columbia-Shuswap
  - Thompson - Nicola
  - Okanagan - Similkameen
  - Central Okanagan
  - North Okanagan
  - Squamish - Lillooet (only including the communities of: Birken, Bralorne, Gold Bridge, Pavilion, Lillooet, Seton Portage, Shalalth)
  - Columbia - Shuswap (only the area including the communities of: Anglemont, Falkland, Salmon Arm, Sicamous, Canoe, Malakwa, Sorrento, Tappen)
- South East Region: includes the Kootenays and most of the Columbia-Shuswap
  - Kootenay Boundary
  - Central Kootenay
  - East Kootenay
  - Columbia - Shuswap (not including the communities of: Anglemont, Falkland, Salmon Arm District, Sicamous, Canoe, Malakwa, Sorrento, Tappen)
- North East Region: the second largest, comprises the North Coast, including Haida Gwaii, Skeena, Bulkley–Nechako, and along the Alaska and Yukon borders.
  - Northern Rockies
  - Peace River
  - Fraser - Fort George
  - Cariboo
  - Central Coast
- North West Region: the largest in the province, takes in the Peace River Country, Cariboo and Central Coast
  - Stikine
  - Kitimat - Stikine
  - Bulkley - Nechako
  - Skeena - Queen Charlotte

== Volunteers' powers, privileges and recognition ==
- Volunteers are allowed to use the Disaster Response Route when on duty
- Under Section 27(1b) of the Emergency Program Act, a person commits an offence who interferes with or obstructs any person in the exercise of any power or the performance of any duty conferred or imposed by this Act or the regulations is liable to imprisonment for a term of not more than one year or to a fine of not more than $10 000 or to both imprisonment and fine. This provision has been transferred to section 139 of the B.C. Emergency and Disaster Management Act (Bill 31) which received Royal Assent on November 8, 2023.
- Civil liability exemption under the B.C. Emergency and Disaster Management Act (Bill 31) and WorkSafeBC coverage are both provided for any Public Safety Lifeline Volunteers. Section 30 provides more detail.
- B.C.’s Good Samaritan Act applies to all volunteers (unless grossly negligent)
- Training from the provincial, regional and municipal governments.
- Special annual awards night.

== Note ==
Only persons over the age of 16 may sign up to become a volunteer. Persons aged 16–18 must have parental consent. There is no maximum age limit.

== See also ==
- E-Comm, 9-1-1 call and dispatch centre for Southwestern BC
- HealthLink BC
- Emergency Management BC
