= List of emergency organizations in British Columbia =

The following is a list of organizations with a primary role in emergency management in British Columbia, Canada. These organizations, often working together and with others, e.g. law enforcement and other first responders, to ensure the health and safety of people during an emergency or a disaster.

== Emergency Management Organizations ==
=== Federal ===
- Public Safety Canada, Emergency Management

=== Provincial ===
- Ministry of Emergency Management and Climate Readiness
  - Emergency Info BC
  - Prepared BC
  - Emergency Support Services
- Ministry of Health
  - Health Emergency Management BC
  - E-Comm, 9-1-1 call and dispatch centre for B.C.
  - British Columbia Ambulance Service
  - BC Emergency Health Services
- First Nations' Emergency Services Society of British Columbia
- Municipal/regional
  - North Island 911 Corporation, provides 9-1-1 service to North Vancouver Island
  - Victoria Operations Communication Centre provides 9-1-1 service to Greater Victoria
  - VECTOR, Vancouver Emergency Community Telecommunications Organization
  - VEMA, Vancouver Emergency Management Agency (formerly Office of Emergency Management)
  - VictoriaReady, (formerly Victoria Emergency Management Agency)
  - District of Saanich Emergency Program
  - PEMO, Peninsula Emergency Measures Organization
- Non-profit Organizations
  - Canadian Red Cross
  - Salvation Army
  - St. John Ambulance Canada

== Search and Rescue Organizations ==
=== Maritime SAR ===
- Canadian Coast Guard
  - Royal Canadian Marine Search & Rescue (RCM-SAR) (Formerly Canadian Coast Guard Auxiliary)
  - Canadian Coast Guard Auxiliary (operating as RCM-SAR)

=== Air SAR ===
- PEP Air

=== Ground SAR ===
- 100 Mile & District Search and Rescue
- Alberni Valley Rescue Squad
- Anahim Lake Search and Rescue Association
- Arrowsmith Search and Rescue Society
- Barriere Search and Rescue Association
- Bella Coola Valley Search and Rescue
- British Columbia Cave Rescue
- Bulkley Valley Search and Rescue
- Burns Lake Search and Rescue
- Campbell River Search and Rescue Society
- Castlegar Search and Rescue
- Central Cariboo Search and Rescue
- Central Fraser Valley Search and Rescue Society
- Central Okanagan Search & Rescue Society
- Chetwynd Search and Rescue
- Chilliwack Search and Rescue
- Columbia Valley Search and Rescue
- Comox Valley Ground Search and Rescue
- Coquitlam Search and Rescue
- Cowichan Search and Rescue
- Cranbrook and District Search and Rescue
- Dease Lake Search and Rescue
- Elkford Search and Rescue
- Fernie Search and Rescue
- Fort Nelson Search and Rescue
- Fort St. James Search and Rescue
- Golden & District Search and Rescue Society
- Grand Forks Search and Rescue
- Hope Volunteer Search and Rescue Group
- Juan de Fuca Ground Search and Rescue
- Kamloops Search and Rescue Society
- Kaslo Search and Rescue
- Kent Harrison Search & Rescue
- Kimberley Search and Rescue
- Kitimat Search and Rescue
- Ladysmith Search and Rescue
- Lake Cowichan Search and Rescue
- Lions Bay Search and Rescue
- Logan Lake Search and Rescue
- Metchosin Search and Rescue
- Mission Search and Rescue
- Nakusp Search and Rescue
- Nanaimo Search and Rescue Society
- Nelson Search and Rescue
- Nicola Valley Search and Rescue
- North Peace Search and Rescue
- North Shore Rescue
- Oliver - Osoyoos Search and Rescue
- Pemberton District Search and Rescue
- Peninsula Emergency Measures Organization
- Penticton and District Emergency Program Society
- Powell River Search and Rescue
- Prince George Search and Rescue
- Prince Rupert Search and Rescue
- Princeton Ground Search and Rescue
- Quesnel Search and Rescue Society
- Revelstoke Search and Rescue
- Ridge Meadows Search and Rescue
- Rossland Search and Rescue
- Shuswap Search and Rescue
- South Columbia Search and Rescue
- South Peace Emergency Response Team
- Sparwood Search and Rescue
- Squamish Emergency Program
- Sunshine Coast Search and Rescue Society
- South Fraser Search and Rescue Society
- Terrace Search and Rescue
- Tumbler Ridge Search and Rescue
- Valemount/McBride/Robson Valley Search and Rescue
- Vernon Search and Rescue Group Society
- Victoria Search and Rescue
- Wells Gray Search and Rescue
- West Chilcotin Search and Rescue
- Westcoast Inland Search and Rescue
- Whistler Search and Rescue
