= E-Comm =

Canadian emergency services agency

Coordinates: 49°16′48.75″N 123°2′0.91″W

Emergency Communications for British Columbia Incorporated
- Type: Government-Private
- Industry: Emergency Communications
- Founded: Vancouver, British Columbia (1997)
- Headquarters: Vancouver, British Columbia, Canada
- Key people: Nancy Blair, Interim CEO & President
- Website: Ecomm911.ca

E-Comm 9-1-1 is a multi-municipality agency that provides emergency communications for British Columbia. The company is a coordinating 9-1-1 PSAP (Public Safety Answering Point) for police, fire, and ambulance services in all of the province of BC, excluding the City of Nelson. E-Comm provides police and fire specific SSAP (Site/Structure Address Point) call-taking and dispatch services for multiple agencies in the Lower Mainland and Southern Vancouver Island areas.

E-Comm's SSAP services cover from Whistler to Abbotsford, including the Sunshine Coast, as well as Vancouver Island from the town of Cassidy to Victoria.

E-Comm owns and operates the Wide-Area Radio Network (WARN), a shared communications system used by police agencies, fire departments and the entire British Columbia Ambulance Service in Metro Vancouver. The WARN features earthquake-resistant infrastructure and enhanced security measures, providing improved coverage, clarity, and reliability. The WARN allows for real-time communication between members of separate agencies, increasing inter-agency communication and coordination. WARN was replaced in Spring 2018 by the Next Generation Radio Program (NGRP)

== History ==
Interest in consolidating emergency communications in southwest British Columbia began in the early 1990s following a series of large-scale disasters. The disorganized state of emergency communications during those incidents demonstrated that contemporary un-integrated communications services were not effective in dealing with large incidents, and required reform.

In spring of 1994, hockey fever captured British Columbia as the Vancouver Canucks advanced to the Stanley Cup Final. When they lost the seventh and final game of the series, huge crowds of fans took to the streets to lament the team's loss and were quickly joined by troublemakers attracted to the large groups of people. The unhappy crowd soon erupted into a full-scale riot. The Vancouver Police were forced to call in the Crowd Control Unit and request back up from neighbouring Royal Canadian Mounted Police (RCMP) detachments in an effort to disperse the out-of-control crowd. In the midst of the chaos, the Vancouver Police radio system was unable to handle the increased amount of radio traffic. Paramedics, firefighters and police found themselves in danger because their radio systems were not compatible with each other.

Following the riot, widely known as the Stanley Cup Riot, the provincial government began planning for an organization that would consolidate all emergency radio and phone services to allow information sharing between agencies and members. E-Comm was established under the Emergency Communications Corporations Act of 1997. As a cost-recovery business corporation, it is owned by stakeholders made up of all the agencies that use its service, which include municipalities, police boards, provincial and federal government agencies, and crown corporations.

In May 2026, E-Comm's unionized staff voted 95% in favour of strike action.

== The E-Comm Facilities ==
E-Comm currently has two Emergency Communications Centres (ECCs). The original Lower Mainland ECC is located at 3301 East Pender Street in Vancouver, across from the Pacific National Exhibition. It was built in 1998. The Southern Vancouver Island ECC is located at 4219 Commerce Circle in Saanich. It was built in 2018. E-Comm's buildings are post-disaster facilities, designed to resist a major earthquake or other large-scale disaster, permitting the continued operation of emergency communications in such a situation. Special attention was paid to the facility's mechanical, electrical, structural and communication systems to ensure they are highly reliable, fault tolerant and resistant to hazard. The buildings are reinforced concrete structures with shatterproof glass, and have storage capacity for emergency food and water. Backup support systems that lend to the building's self-sufficiency include communication, mechanical plants, emergency power generation, uninterruptible power sources, and emergency water and food storage.

The Lower Mainland ECC also serves as the Vancouver Emergency Management Agency and City of Vancouver Emergency Operations Centre (EOC), Vancouver Emergency Community Telecommunications Organization (VECTOR), and Vancouver Emergency Support Services (ESS).

== Governance and shareholders ==
E-Comm is managed by a Board of Directors made up of 20 members nominated by the shareholders. Day-to-day operation is managed by the President & CEO of E-Comm.

Shareholders include:

- Abbotsford
- British Columbia Ambulance Service
- Coquitlam
- Delta
- Lions Bay
- Maple Ridge
- Metro Vancouver
- New Westminster
- City of North Vancouver
- District of North Vancouver
- Pitt Meadows
- Port Coquitlam
- Port Moody
- Richmond
- South Coast British Columbia Transportation Authority Police Service
- Surrey
- Township of Langley
- Vancouver
- Village of Belcarra
- West Vancouver
- White Rock

RCMP "E" Division is not a shareholder of E-Comm even though certain RCMP detachments in BC are within the E-Comm radio network.

== Call Statistics ==
E-Comm maintains statistics about the number of calls that are made to the company within a given year, and the percentage of calls that were answered within 5 seconds ("service level"). The target service level is 95%, meaning that E-Comm aims to answer 95% of calls within 5 seconds (one ring). The reduction in number of calls over the years has been attributed to a series of public outreach campaigns teaching citizens to educate their children on the proper use of 9-1-1, and reminding citizens to lock or turn off their cell phones to prevent accidental "pocket dial" calls to 9-1-1.

Year	Number of Calls	Service Level
2025	2,004,278	97%
2024	2,049,856	98%
2023	2,342,892	98%
2022	2,109,440	98%
2021	2,082,994	92%
2020	1,848,141	98%
2019	1,893,118	97%
2018	1,588,011	98%
2017	1,452,637	98%
2016	1,368,416	98%
2015	1,246,520	98%
2014	932,481	98%
2013	861,694	98%
2012	911,571	98%
2011	941,191	97%
2010	1,031,326	96%
2009	1,024,137	96%
2008	1,013,887	98%
2007	1,037,852	96%
2006	1,089,771	96%
2005	1,248,521	97%
2004	1,258,824	95%
2003	1,252,903	95%
2002	1,200,930	96%

== Budget ==
E-Comm has an annual budget of $70 million, collected through the municipalities that use E-Comm's service. This includes the "Radio Levy" (based on radios issued and traffic), the "Dispatch Levy" (based on allocation of human resources to take the call and dispatch officers) and the "9-1-1 Levy" for Metro Vancouver region that is collected through property taxes.

== Next Generation Radio Program (NGRP) ==
In Spring 2018, E-Comm 911 completed a full transition to replace their aging 800 MHz EDACS Wide-Area radio network The new radio system, known as the Next Generation Radio Program, utilizes a Motorola Project 25 700 MHz band. The choice to switch to a Project 25 system was made following over a year of consultation with local stakeholders.

Per E-Comm's press release, the new Motorola system has some new key features:

- Greater reliability
- Water immersion resistance
- Radio monitoring (enabling dispatchers to remotely activate radio microphones for improved responder safety)
- Noise-cancelling technology to reduce background sounds and allow responders to be heard more clearly in noisy environments
- Increased coverage, audio clarity and security
- GPS tracking
- An expanded range of accessories and the ability to add new features through software upgrades in the future

Project 25 modulation allows first responder communications to be encrypted from monitoring by commercially available radio scanners. All British Columbia Ambulance Service, most Metro Vancouver fire departments, and all Metro Vancouver police agencies are on the new NGRP system.

== See also ==
- List of emergency organizations in British Columbia
- List of law enforcement agencies in British Columbia
- Provincial Emergency Program
- Emergency Social Services
