= British Columbia Ambulance Service =

Ambulance service in British Columbia, Canada

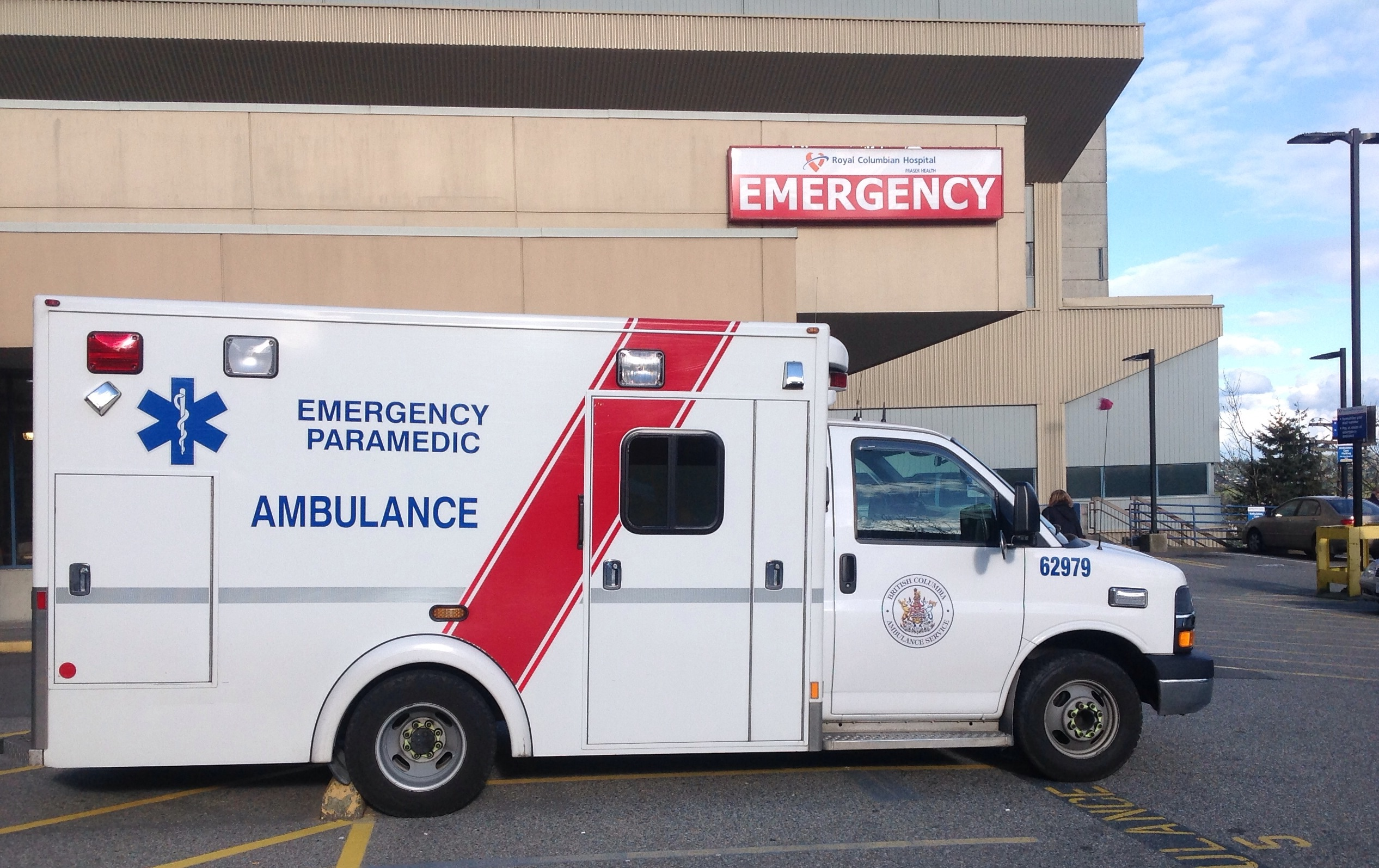

Provincial agency overview
- Formed: July 1, 1974
- Jurisdiction: British Columbia
- Headquarters: Victoria, British Columbia
- Employees: 6,500 (January 2024)
- Annual budget: $766 million (2023)
- Minister responsible: Josie Osborne
- Provincial agency executives: Leanne Heppell, Executive Vice President & Chief Ambulance Officer; Jennie Helmer, Chief Operations Officer; Dr. Sandra Jenneson, Chief Medical Officer; Kevin Smith, Chief Systems & Strategy Officer; Paul Vallely, Chief Quality, Planning and Coordination Officer and Interim Chief Paramedic Practice
- Parent department: Provincial Health Services Authority
- Website: www.bcehs.ca

The British Columbia Ambulance Service (BCAS) is an ambulance service that provides emergency medical response for the province of British Columbia, Canada. BCAS is one of the largest providers of emergency medical services in North America. The fleet consists of 658 ground ambulances operating from 183 stations across the province along with 283 non-transport support vehicles. Additionally, BCAS provides inter-facility patient transfer services in circumstances where a patient needs to be moved between health care facilities for treatment. BCAS also operates a medical evacuation program that utilizes both fixed-wing and rotary aircraft.

== History ==
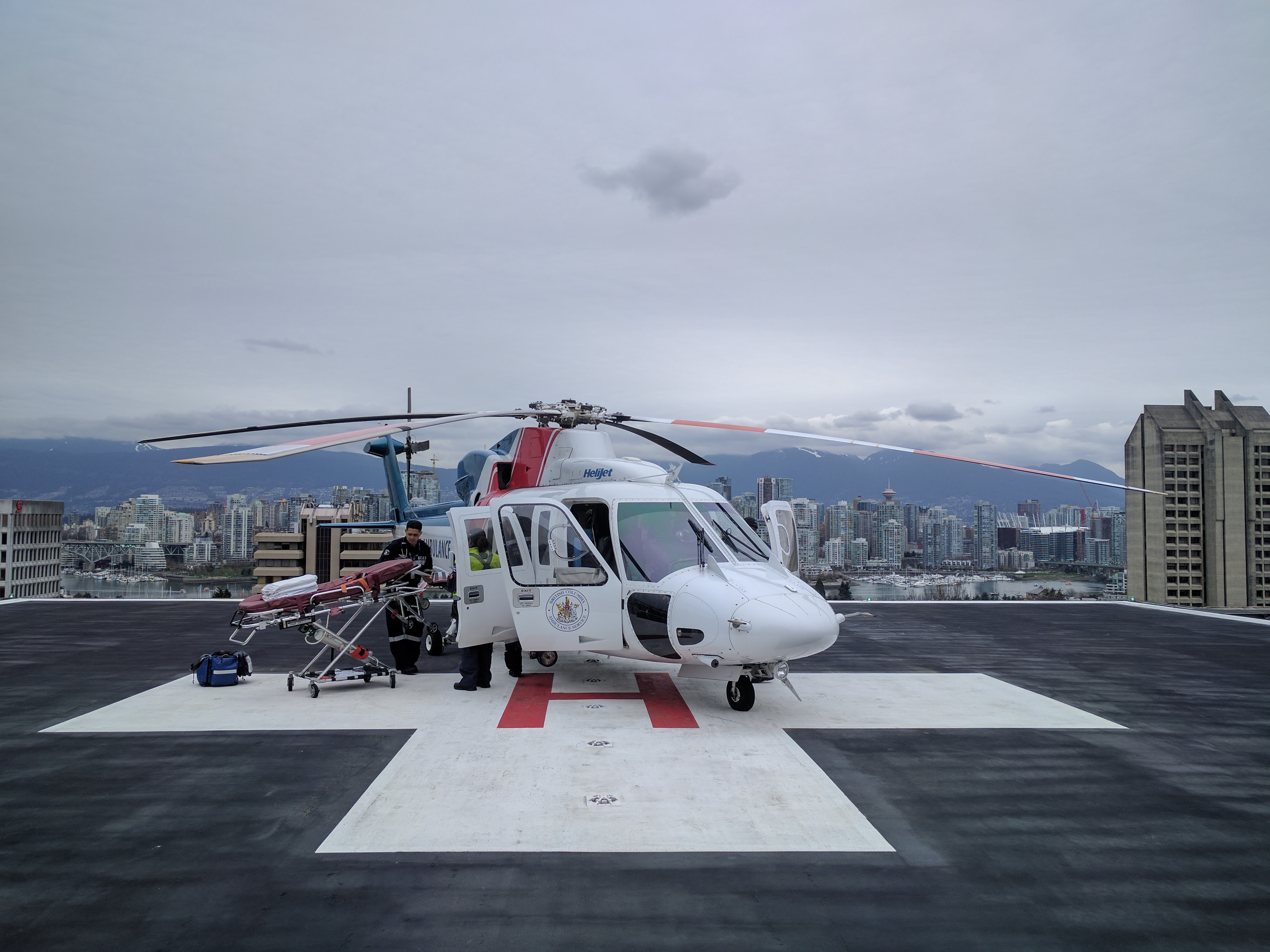
BCEHS critical care team on the helicopter pad on the top of Vancouver General Hospital following the offloading of a patient.

Prior to 1974, ambulance services in British Columbia were provided by a mixture of volunteer ambulance brigades, fire departments, funeral homes, and private operators. As a result of recommendations made by the Foulkes Commission's report on health care, titled "Health Security for British Columbians" released in 1973, the Government of British Columbia created the Emergency Health Services Commission (EHSC), which in turn created the BC Ambulance Service on July 4, 1974. On March 13, 2013, the Emergency Health Services Commission (EHSC) was renamed BC Emergency Health Services (BCEHS) and placed under the jurisdiction of the Provincial Health Services Authority. In July 2021, in response to the events of the 2021 Heat Dome, B.C. Health Minister Adrian Dix created a separate board of directors for BCEHS, with the board reporting directly to the B.C Minister of Health.

== Organization ==
BCAS is managed by British Columbia Emergency Health Services (BCEHS), which is under the jurisdiction of the Provincial Health Services Authority (PHSA). The operating budget for BCEHS in 2023 was $766 million.

There are 183 ambulance stations in British Columbia, including the transfer fleet. As of 2024, the BCAS employs 5040 part-time and full-time paramedics and dispatchers. Dispatch centres are located in Kamloops, Vancouver, and Victoria.

The Emergency Medical Assistants Licensing Board is an independent regulatory body responsible for licensing paramedics.

== BC Air Ambulance and Critical Care Programs (Fleet, Bases, Positions) ==
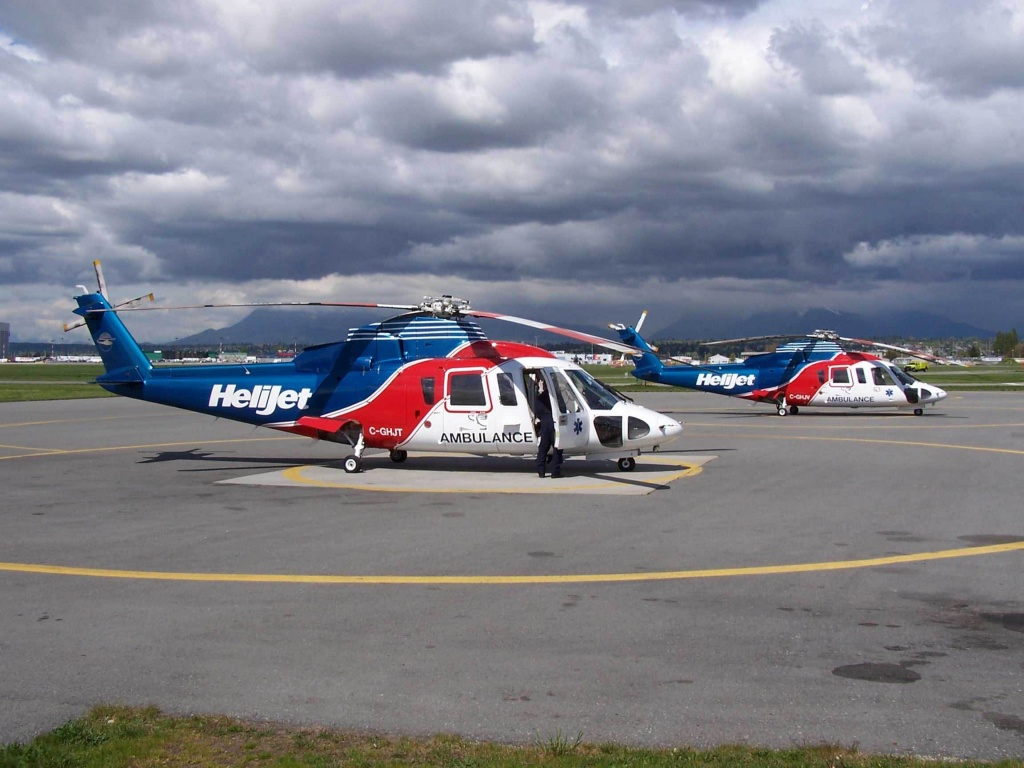
BCEHS helicopters based in Vancouver

BCEHS's air ambulance program consists of a fleet of ten fixed-wing aircraft with three each in Vancouver and Kelowna, two in Prince George, and one each in Nanaimo and Fort St. John. Additional aircraft are chartered on an as-needed basis. In addition to its planes, BCEHS operates six dedicated air ambulance helicopters, two based in Vancouver, one in Nanaimo, one in Kamloops, one in Prince George, and one in Prince Rupert. BCEHS also utilizes approximately 35 pre-qualified charter carriers throughout British Columbia. Helijet, an airline based in Richmond, B.C., provides helicopters, pilots, and maintenance crews to their Sikorsky S76 helicopters contracted by BCEHS in Vancouver and Prince Rupert. Helijet has been servicing BCEHS since 1988, expanding to Prince Rupert in 2011. The Sikorsky air ambulances can carry up to 2 stretchers and 4 medical attendants and can travel a maximum distance of 200 miles (320 km), serving a 100 mile radius from their base.

In 2023, BCEHS announced Ascent Helicopters Ltd. was awarded a 10-year, $554.4 million (CAD) contract to provide air ambulance service. Seven Leonardo AW169 helicopters were expected to enter service in the fall of 2024, replacing existing Helijet service.

BC Air Ambulance operates bases and airevac teams at stations: Parksville (180), Vancouver International (280), BC Children's and Womens Hospital ITT (283), Kamloops (370), Kelowna (380), Prince George (580), Prince Rupert (684), and Fort St John (860.)

=== Critical Care Paramedic & Specialization ===
Critical Care Paramedic (Adult CCT), Critical Care Paramedic (MNP.)

=== Flight Paramedic & Specialization ===
Primary Care Flight Paramedic (PCFP), Advanced Care Flight Paramedic (ACFP) or PCFP (MNP) and ACFP (MNP.)

== Licensing and qualifications ==
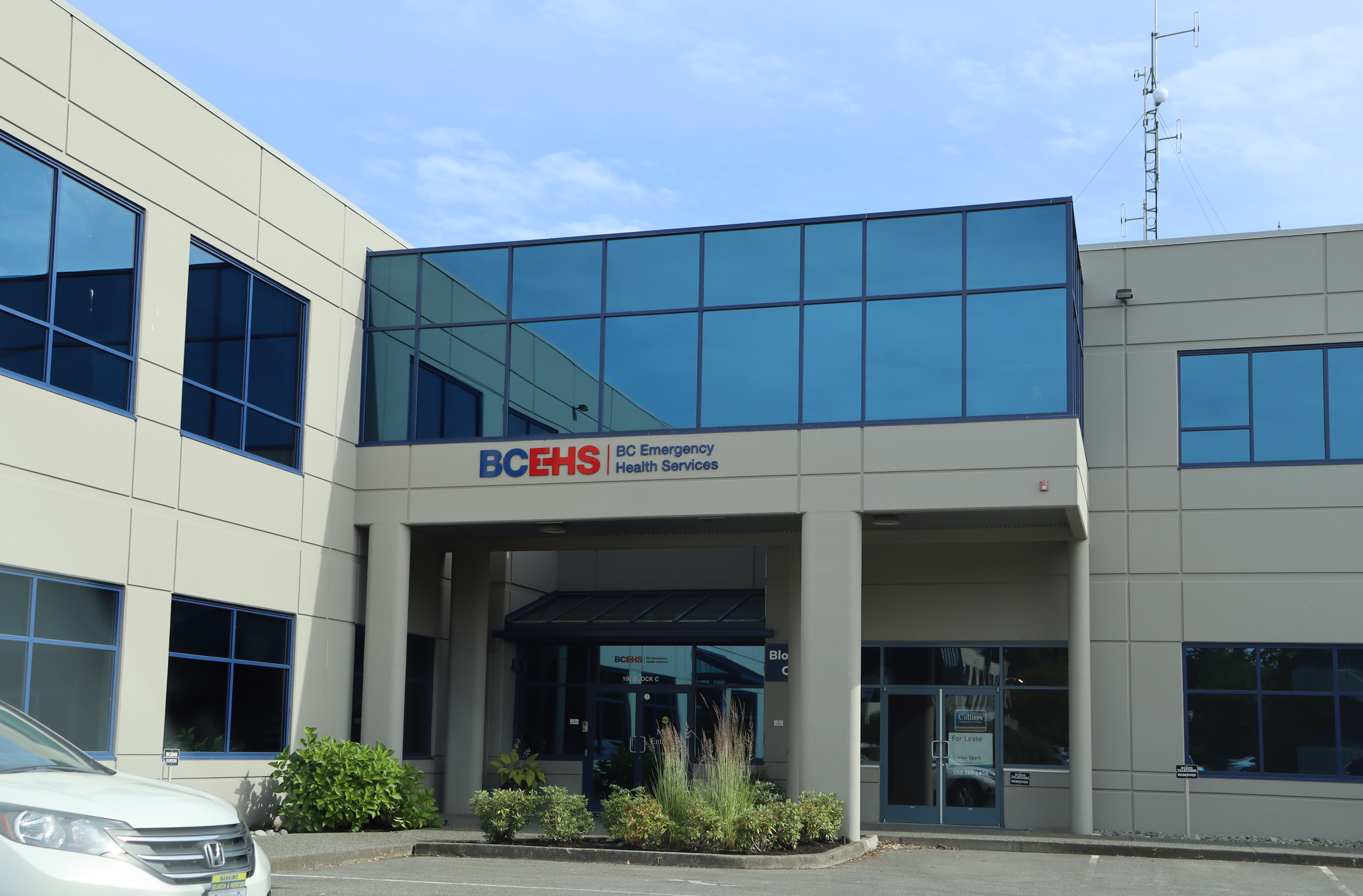
BC Emergency Health Services headquarters

Paramedics qualified in British Columbia are broadly grouped as emergency medical assistants (EMAs) and are licensed by the Emergency Medical Assistants Licensing Board (EMALB), an independent government regulatory agency, under one of six categories:

- Emergency medical responder (EMR)
- Primary care paramedic (PCP)
- Advanced care paramedic (ACP)
- Critical care paramedic (CCP)
- Infant Transport Team (ITT)

Paramedics from other provinces and countries who request to be licensed in British Columbia will need to apply to the EMALB for equivalency.

All paramedics employed by BC Ambulance are required to obtain a Class 4 driver's licence.

=== Clinical practice ===
Paramedics in BC do not work under the license of a physician as they do in other provinces/jurisdictions. They hold their own licenses under the authority of the EMALB. Paramedic practitioners practicing in BC do not use protocols, instead, they utilize BCEHS Clinical Practice Guidelines (CPGs). CPGs are the medical resource documents that guide paramedic practice in the province. CPGs are a combination of best practice and evidence-based medicine designed to better equip paramedics to make informed decisions in the field. They provide valuable information regarding not only what paramedics should do for patients under certain circumstances, but also the decision of when, and if, that care is appropriate is dependent on their ability to decide the best course of action for the patient.

Many paramedics seek additional training to achieve licence endorsements, which authorize them to perform medical interventions/treatments outside of their normal scope of practice. The two most common licence endorsements are for EMRs to utilize narcotic antagonists (otherwise known as Narcan or Naloxone) and a licence level referred to as PCP-IV, which authorizes Primary Care Paramedics to initiate and maintain an IV as well as administer certain medications and crystalloid fluids through an IV line.

Selected PCPs and ACPs are able to administer NA-1 (if endorsed and authorized) after consultation with a transport advisor as part of the FRONTIER stroke trial. If successful, this trial will change stroke management and highlight the essential role of prehospital care in stroke management.

Selected ACPs are able to administer TNKase (if endorsed and authorized) after consultation with a transport advisor as part of the Collaborative Heart Attack Management Program (CHAMP) Protocol for ST-Elevation Myocardial Infarction Pre-hospital Reperfusion. If this trial is successful, it can be extended to other areas of the province.

Paramedics have the ability to initiate critical patient bypasses to specialized centres with certain patient presentations and initiate alternate transport destinations to alleviate pressures and patient transport to emergency departments. Some of these include:

- Stroke bypass
- STEMI bypass
- Palliative care (ASTAR Clinical Pathway)
- Influenza like illness (ILI Clinical Pathway)
- Major trauma bypass
- Pediatric and obstetrics bypass
- Sobering centres/detox

=== Emergency Medical Assistant First Responder ===
Emergency Medical Assistant First Responders (EMA FRs) are licensed Emergency Medical Assistants in British Columbia; however, they are not employed by BCAS. Most EMA FRs work as fire fighters/fire rescue.

Upon completion of an approved EMA FR training program in British Columbia (ranging from 55 to 84 hours), students may apply for licensing with the Emergency Medical Assistants Licensing Board (EMALB). EMA FRs are licensed to provide scene and patient assessments, perform cardiopulmonary resuscitation, insert and maintain airway devices (both oropharyngeal and nasopharyngeal), utilize suction devices, bag-valve-mask devices, and automatic and semi-automatic defibrillators, manage wounds (not requiring tissue puncture or indentation) and fractures, immobilize fractures, and lift/load and extricate/evacuate patients.

EMA FRs may be endorsed to perform spinal motion restriction and emergency childbirth, utilize pulse oximeters, CO-oximeters, and glucometers, perform non-invasive blood pressure measurement, and administer the following medications:

- Oral glucose
- Epinephrine (by either intramuscular auto-injector or prepared intranasal and sublingual preparations)
- Pro-coagulants and antifibrinolytics
- Opioid antagonists (intramuscularly or intranasally)
- Anti-hypoglycemic agents (intramuscularly or intranasally)
- Oral analgesics
- Acetylsalicylic acid

EMA FRs may also be endorsed to assist a patient with the administration of a medication.

=== Emergency Medical Responder ===
Emergency Medical Responders (EMRs) are licensed to "administer basic life-saving emergency medical care".

Upon completion of an approved EMR training program in British Columbia (~100 hours), students may apply for licensing with the Emergency Medical Assistants Licensing Board (EMALB). EMRs are licensed to provide all Emergency Medical Assistant First Responder (EMA FR) designated services (and endorsements), in addition to occupational first aid, transportation, and soft tissue injury management.

EMRs may be further endorsed to maintain intravenous lines (without medications or blood products), perform chest auscultations, and administer the following medications:

- Anti-anginal agents (e.g., nitroglycerin)
- Analgesic agents (e.g., nitrous oxide)
- Platelet inhibitors
- Epinephrine (intramuscular)
- Bronchodilators (inhaled or nebulized)

EMR is the lowest level of care employed by BCAS, and most EMRs work at rural ambulance stations on part-time shifts or full-time performing interfacility transfers. Further training is required (e.g. in primary care paramedicine) before transferring to a BCAS station in a larger population centre.

=== Primary Care Paramedic ===
Primary Care Paramedics (PCPs) are licensed to administer more advanced pre-hospital care. PCP is the most common level of care in BCAS and are dispatched to the majority of pre-hospital ambulance calls, and can treat a wide range of patient presentations autonomously. Primary care paramedic programs are a 1-year duration post-secondary certificate in the province of British Columbia. Unlike EMA FR or EMR education, PCP education consist of multiple terms and pre-hospital/health sciences courses. It also includes clinical hospital shifts and land ambulance placements (preceptorship) responding to 9-1-1 emergency calls. Most programs are offered full-time.

In addition to all services provided by EMRs, PCPs are licensed to insert extraglottic airway devices, perform semi-automatic external defibrillation, initiate peripheral IV access, administer isotonic crystalloid solutions, perform ETCO2 monitoring and administer various medications through IV, oral (PO), subcutaneous, sublingual, intramuscular, inhalation, intranasal, intraosseous and nebulization routes. This includes the administration of anti-emetics, corticosteroids, anti-pyretics, procoagulants, anti-histamines, opiate and non-opiate analgesia, anti-nauseants, anti-cholinergics and vitamins.

PCPs can administer the following symptom relief medications:

- Acetaminophen (PO/IV)
- Acetylsalicylic Acid (PO)
- Dexamethasone (PO/IM/IV)
- Dextrose D10W (IV)
- Dimenhydrinate (IM/IV)
- Entonox (INH)
- Epinephrine (IM/NEB)
- Glucagon (IM/IN)
- Glucose 40% (PO)
- Hydrocortisone (IM/IV)
- Ibuprofen (PO)
- Ipratropium Bromide (MDI/NEB/CPAP/BVM)
- Ketamine (IN)
- Ketorolac (IM/IV)
- Methoxyflurane (INH)
- Morphine (IM/SC/IV)
- Naloxone (IM/IN/IV)
- Nitroglycerine (SL)
- Ondansetron (PO)
- Salbutamol (MDI/NEB/CPAP/BVM)
- Tranexamic Acid (IM/IV/infusion)

In addition, PCPs can be endorsed for intraosseous insertion and maintenance, ECG acquisition, administration of non-invasive positive airway pressure ventilation devices, and manual defibrillation.

=== Community Paramedic ===
Community Paramedics (CPs) provide non-emergency and scheduled care to patients, often referred to colloquially as "clients," (although CP services are covered by provincial health insurance and come at little to no cost), as part of an integrated healthcare team, usually coordinated with a regional health authority or hospital. Community paramedic classification is neither a licence nor a certification received from an external educational institution. Unlike previously mentioned levels of care, CPs are certified internally, and the services they provide are consistent with their pre-existing licence level. CPs are trained in community outreach and awareness, prevention care services for elderly patients, fall prevention assessments, scheduled and unscheduled home visits, and community public health promotion and education.

=== Advanced Care Paramedic ===
Advanced Care Paramedics (ACPs) are trained to handle more complex cases, including serious trauma and cardiac resuscitation. ACPs work in large population centres such as Vancouver, Victoria, Nanaimo, Kamloops, Kelowna, and Prince George.

=== Infant Transport Team ===
The Infant Transport Team (ITT) are specialized critical care paramedics who are specifically trained in management of perinatal, neonatal and pediatric patients. Formerly, they were primary care paramedics (with many ACP Schedule 2 endorsements) with advanced training to provide emergency medical care to pediatric, neo-natal and high-risk obstetric patients. ITT paramedics work in close collaboration with practitioners at BC Children's & Women's Hospital in Vancouver. The team functions as an extension of the neonatal/pediatric intensive care unit as well as the high risk labour and delivery areas of the hospital. Tertiary level critical care is delivered by the team to the bedside at any location in the province.

They respond as an equally qualified team of two and sometimes take a physician with them for critically ill patients. When dispatched on street calls, these are targeted response ambulances that often assist or intervene when necessary, but can hand a more stable patient off to a layered or co-responding PCP ambulance. The team currently consists of only 25 specially trained paramedics for the entire province.

=== Critical Care Paramedic ===
Critical Care Paramedics (CCPs) provide the most sophisticated care, including transporting patients by air and ground. CCPs specialize in the transport of complex critically injured or ill patients to specialized centres.

=== Paramedic Specialist ===
Paramedic Specialists are licensed advanced care and critical care paramedics who are trained to handle disasters and mass casualty events.

BC Ambulance has clinical consultation available for paramedics where paramedic specialists are enabled and empowered by the organization and by the medical directors to provide clinical, safety, and operational advice to paramedics. The pre-hospital environment poses many clinical challenges to practising paramedics. When faced with these challenges it may be appropriate to seek clarity with an appropriate senior clinician. Paramedics at all license levels can call CliniCall to speak with a paramedic specialist who will be either an ACP or a CCP.

=== Paramedic (Secondary) Triage Clinician ===
Secondary Triage Clinicians are experienced primary care paramedics who conduct follow-up assessments on low acuity patients to determine the most appropriate care plan and response. STCs provide advice via telephone and live video to activate self-care and alternative conveyance pathways for their patients across the province.

=== Link and Referral Unit Paramedics ===
Link and Referral Units are specialized primary care paramedic units that assess and transport low acuity patients in place of an emergency ambulance. The LARUs in service are directed to the most appropriate calls by the Low Acuity Patient Navigator and are supported by a Low Acuity Dispatcher.

== Wages and benefits ==
Wages are paid according to license qualification, years of service and supervisory status. Additional service pay is gained at 10, 15, 20, and 25 years of service.

Hourly Wages (April 1, 2023)
Experience pay	EMR	PCP-IV	ACP	ITT	CCP	EMCT	EMD
Base	$29.48	$32.30	$42.53	$49.77	$49.77	$31.65	$33.22
1 Year	$31.69	$34.55	$44.84	$52.08	$52.08	$33.85	$39.37
2 Years	$33.96	$37.59	$47.65	$54.91	$54.91	$36.99	$42.49
3 Years	$36.47	$41.13	$50.62	$57.87	$57.87	$40.58	$46.11
4 Years	$36.47	$42.13	$51.62	$58.87	$58.87	$41.58	$47.11
5 Years	$36.47	$43.13	$52.62	$59.87	$59.87	$42.58	$48.11

Casual/on-call staff receive $12/hour for on-call shifts until they are called to respond, at which point they receive their full wage.

Part-time and full-time PCP positions are considered separate internal job postings and are filled according to seniority. Selection for full-time PCP positions is determined by total full-time seniority and then, if there are no more full-time PCP applicants, total part-time seniority. Stations in Vancouver typically have the lowest entry threshold for full-time PCP positions. While this has traditionally meant working for in smaller towns to accumulate at least five years of part-time seniority, the required part-time seniority for accepting a full-time spot in Vancouver is currently approaching zero months.

== See also ==
- E-Comm, 9-1-1 call and dispatch centre for Southwestern BC
- List of EMS Services in Ontario
- HealthLink BC
