= List of law enforcement agencies in Canada =

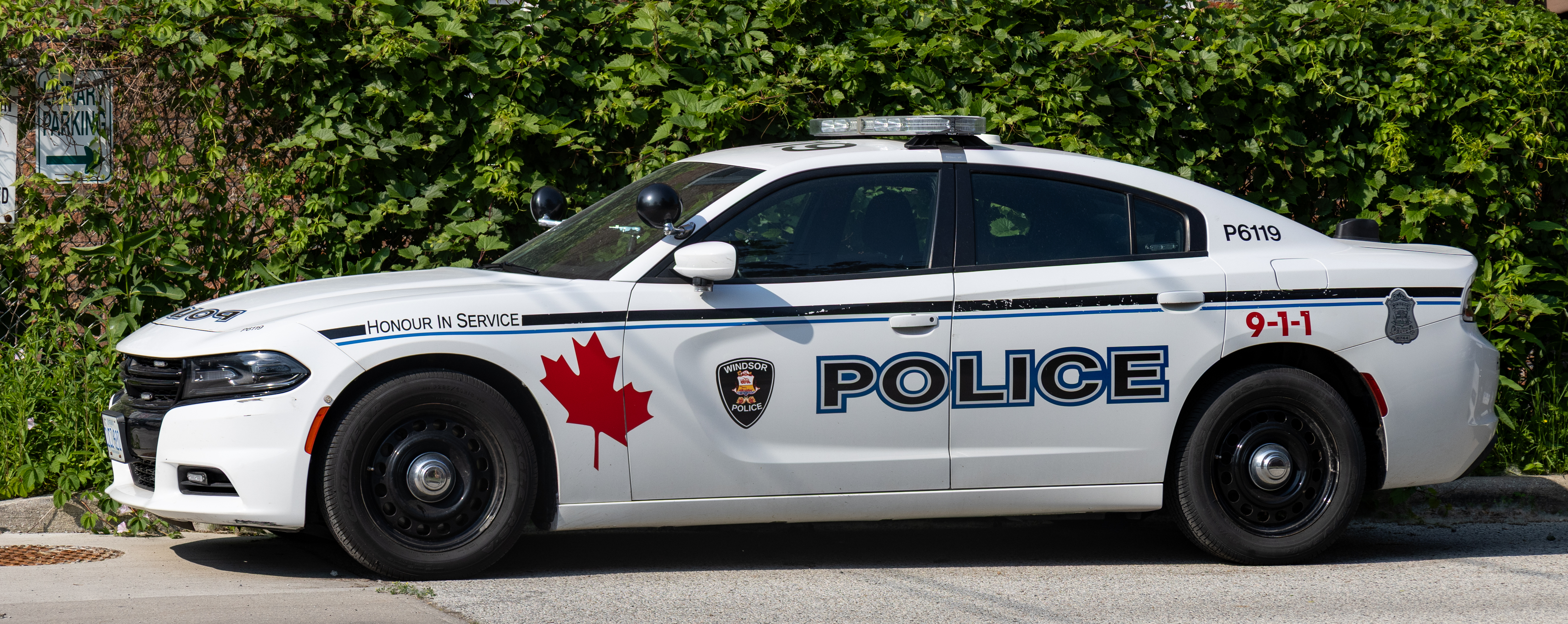
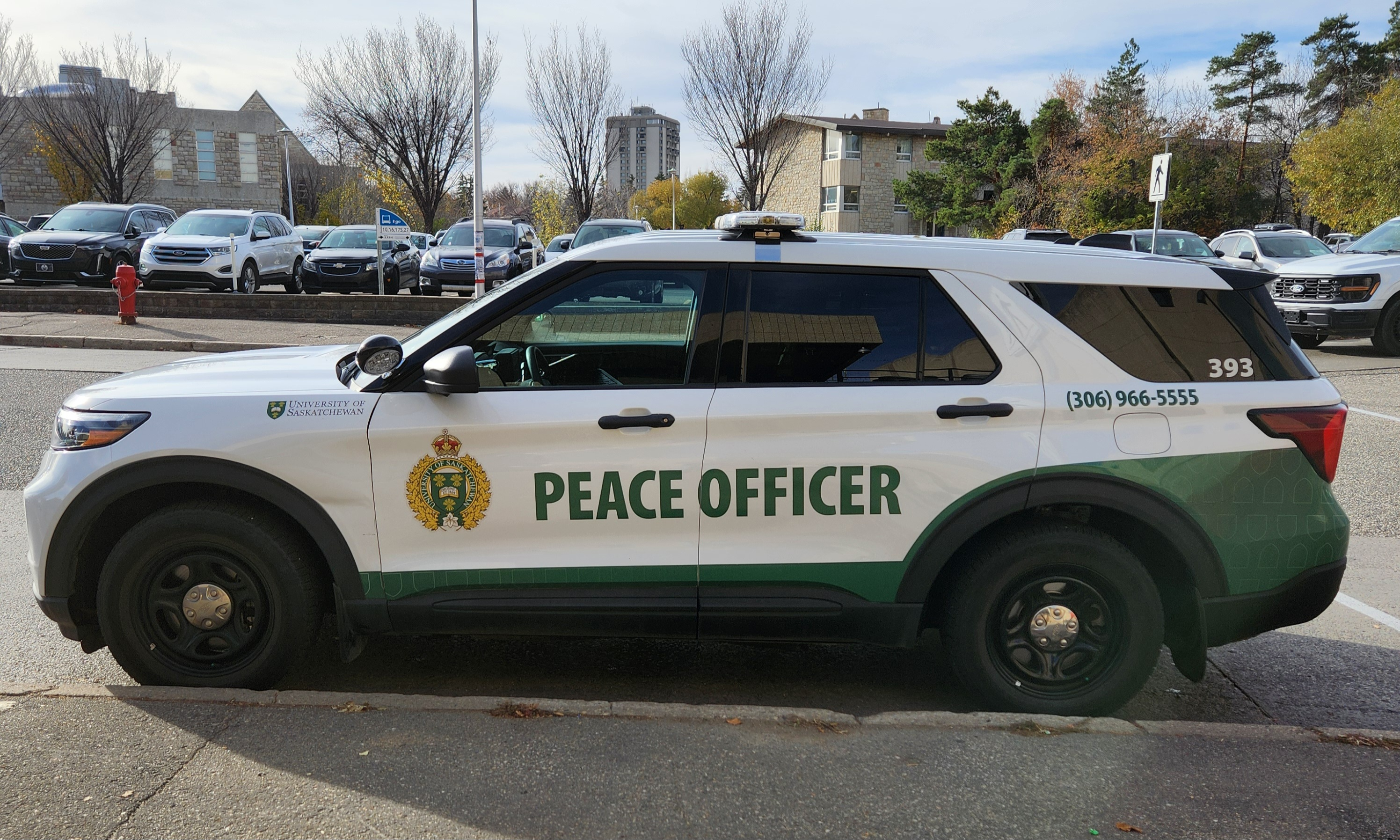
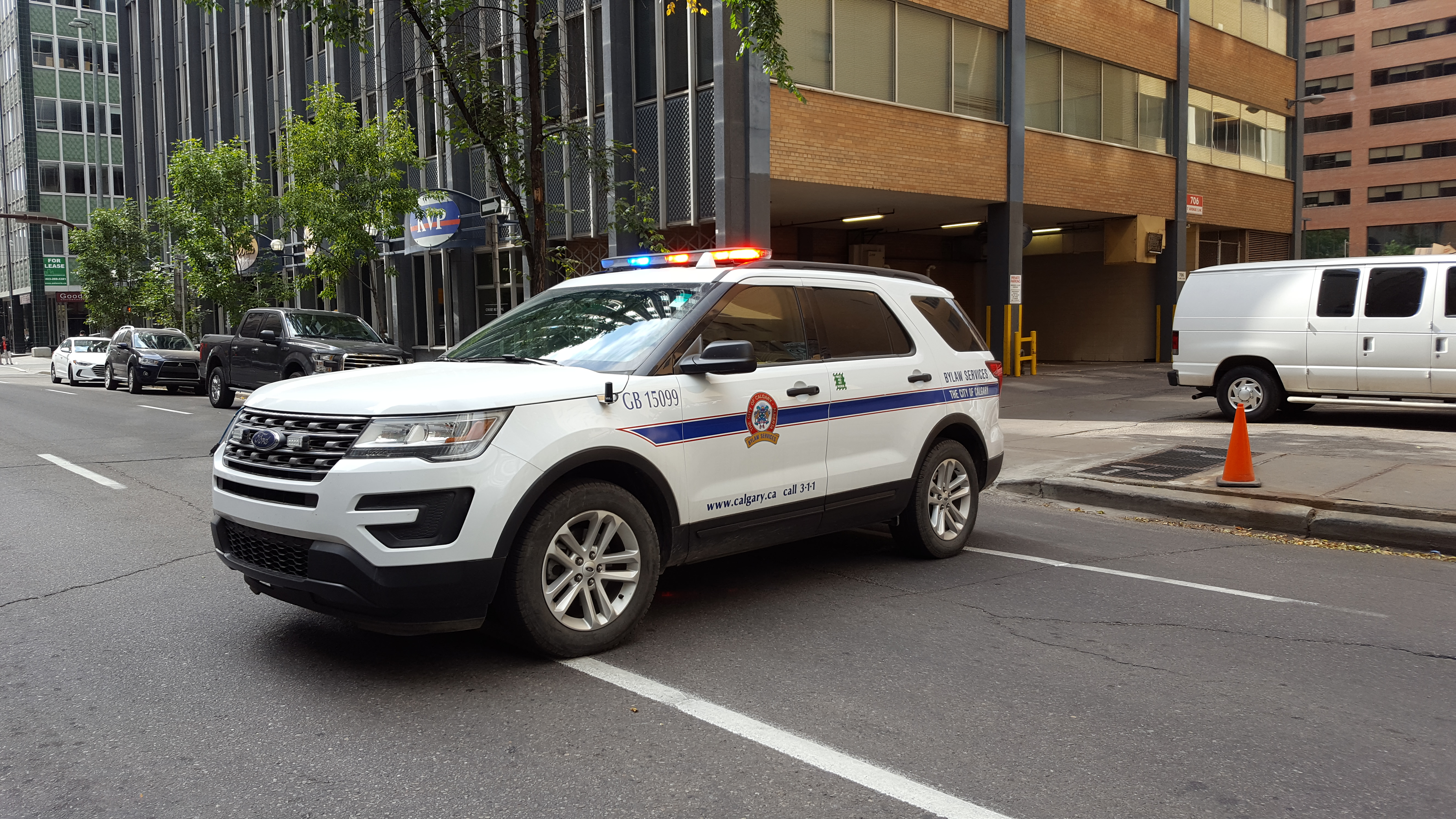
Vehicles belonging to all three types of law enforcement agency in Canada: a police service in Windsor, Ontario; a special constabulary in Saskatoon, Saskatchewan; and a civil law enforcement agency in Calgary, Alberta.

Law enforcement in Canada is the responsibility of police services, special constabularies, and civil law enforcement agencies, which are operated by every level of government, some private and Crown corporations, and First Nations. Canada's provinces are responsible for the development and maintenance of police forces and special constabularies, while civil law enforcement is the responsibility of the level or agency of government that developed those laws, and civil law enforcement agencies may be given a range of powers to enforce those laws. As such, the exact duties and authority of individual law enforcement agencies vary significantly.

Police services may take on additional duties such as municipal by-law enforcement, and police services range in size from small, one-officer forces that are generally limited to enforcing provincial and municipal legislation to large organizations charged with investigating complex financial crimes. In Ontario, police services are obliged to provide at least five core police services — crime prevention, law enforcement, maintenance of the public peace, emergency response, and assistance to victims of crime — to fulfill the province's requirement for "adequate and effective policing," while in neighbouring Quebec, the responsibilities of a police force are dependent on the population it serves. Other jurisdictions, such as Manitoba and British Columbia, do not define adequate and effective policing, although individual regulations in both of those provinces set out basic responsibilities of police forces.

Although special constabularies exist in some form in almost every province, they are referred to by a number of different titles and carry different levels of authority between provinces and agencies. The Niagara Parks Police Service, for example, employs armed officers responsible for providing almost all police services on and in relation to lands owned by the Niagara Parks Commission; while the University of Saskatchewan Protective Services Division's unarmed officers are limited to enforcing University by-laws, some provincial laws, and limited sections of the Criminal Code. The exact definition of a special constabulary also varies province-to-province, and some civil law enforcement agencies, usually those whose staff are designated as special constables, are also sometimes considered special constabularies. Generally, a special constabulary is any law enforcement organization composed of special constables, peace officers, or safety officers (as opposed to police officers) with a mandate for criminal law enforcement and/or general peacekeeping and security.

The powers of civil law enforcement agencies also vary significantly. Some, like the Saskatchewan Highway Patrol, have the authority to enforce criminal legislation in addition to their primary mandate to enforce civil legislation, while others are limited to enforcing only a handful of by-laws or provincial acts. Regardless of the breadth of their legislative authority, all civil law enforcement officers in Canada are considered peace officers for the purposes of carrying out their duties, and may be variously appointed as special constables, municipal law enforcement officers, provincial offences officers, or generically as peace officers.

For the purposes of this list, agencies are grouped by their primary responsibilities and legislative definitions.

== Federal ==
=== Police services ===
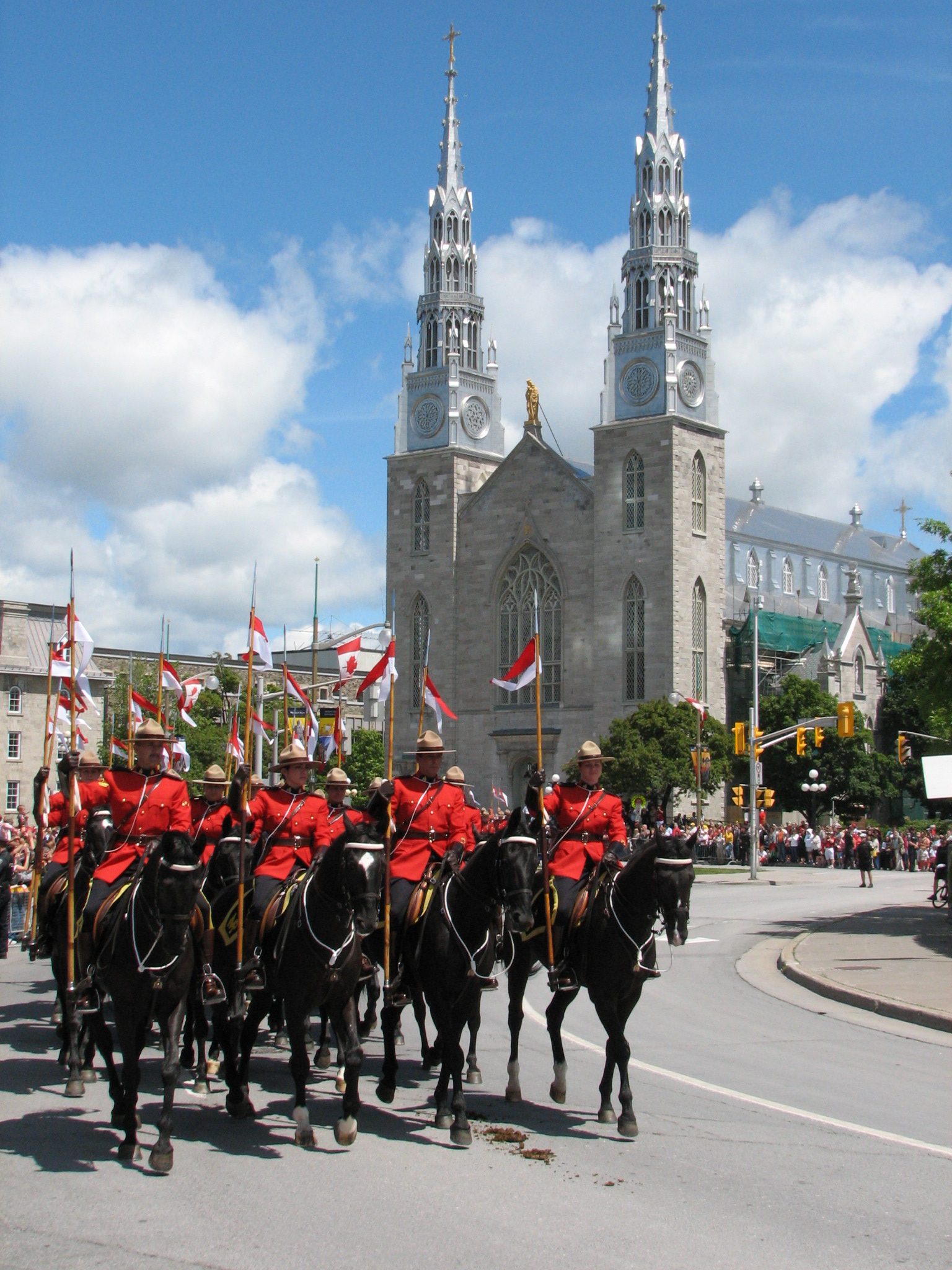
Royal Canadian Mounted Police on Horseback in front of Notre-Dame Cathedral Basilica (Ottawa)

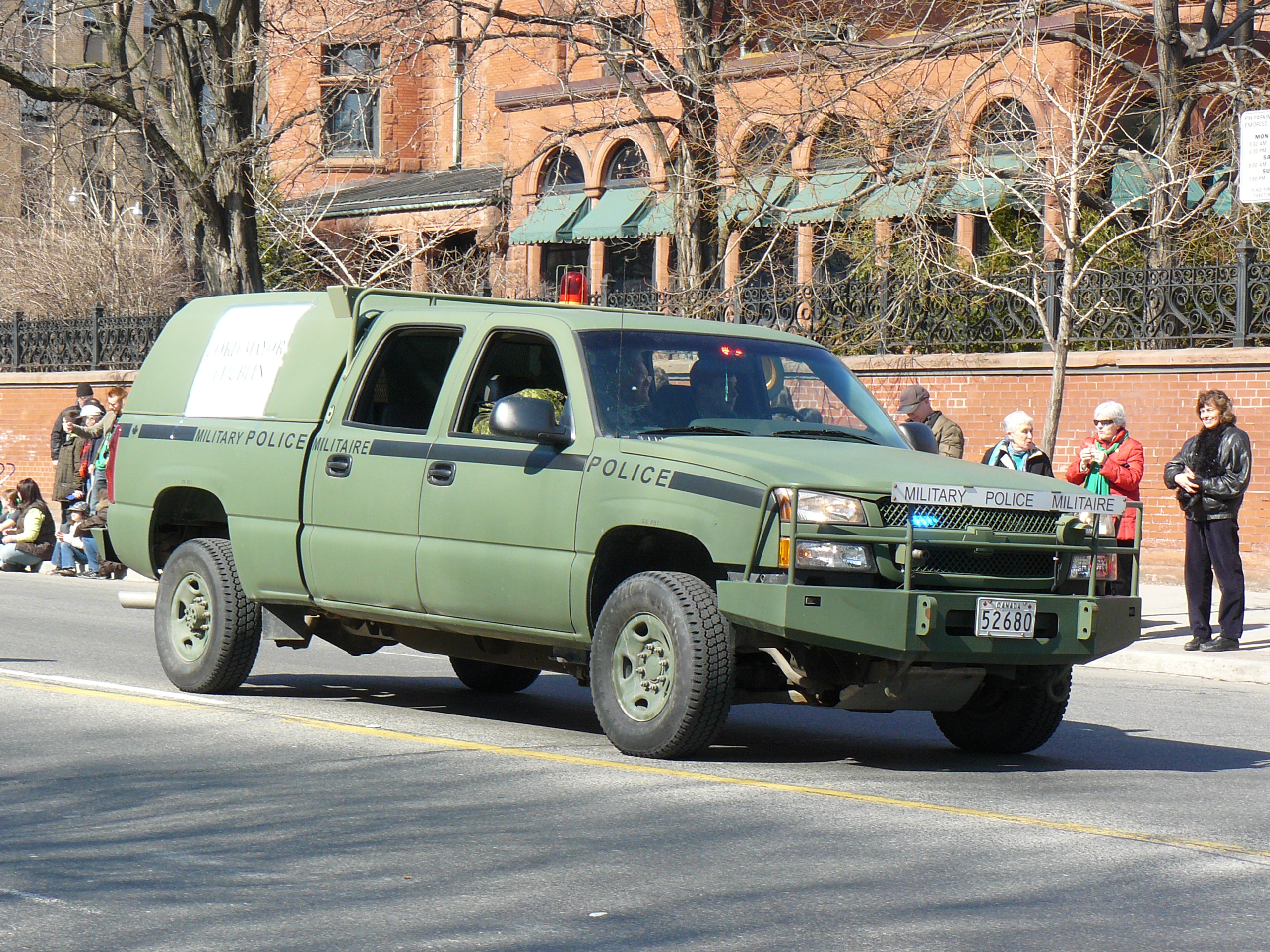
A Canadian Forces Military Police Chevrolet Milverado drives through Toronto.

- Royal Canadian Mounted Police
- Canadian Forces Military Police
  - Canadian Forces National Investigation Service
- National Battlefields Commission Battlefields Park Police

==== Railway police ====
The federal government, under the Railway Safety Act, authorizes any railway in Canada to request that a superior court judge appoint railway employees as police officers. These officers are hired, and employed by the railway for the purposes of preventing crimes against the company and the protection of goods, materials, and public rail transit being moved through the railway network, and have nationwide jurisdiction within 500 metres of a railway line or as it relates to railway operations. Railway police officers receive training through an accredited police college including but not limited to the RCMP Depot Academy or Ontario Police College. There are three such federally-authorized police forces in the country:

- Canadian National Police Service
- Canadian Pacific Kansas City Police Service
- VIA Rail Canada Police Service

==== Nuclear Security Officers ====
The Canadian Nuclear Safety Commission may appoint nuclear security officers as peace officers on high-risk sites. These officers have jurisdiction only on the site to which they work, and have limited authority as peace officers.

=== Civil law enforcement agencies ===
- Canada Border Services Agency
- Canada Post Security & Investigation Services
- Canada Revenue Agency Criminal Investigations Program
- Canadian Food Inspection Agency Inspectors and Investigators
- Correctional Service of Canada
- Competition Bureau
- Environment and Climate Change Canada Environmental and Wildlife Enforcement Officers
- Fisheries and Oceans Canada Fishery Officers
- Health Canada Compliance and Enforcement Officers
- Parks Canada Warden Service
- Transport Canada Inspectors
- National Capital Commission Conservation Officers

=== Security agencies ===
- Parliamentary Protective Service
- Royal Canadian Mint Protective Service
- Bank of Canada Protective Service

== Alberta ==
=== Police services ===
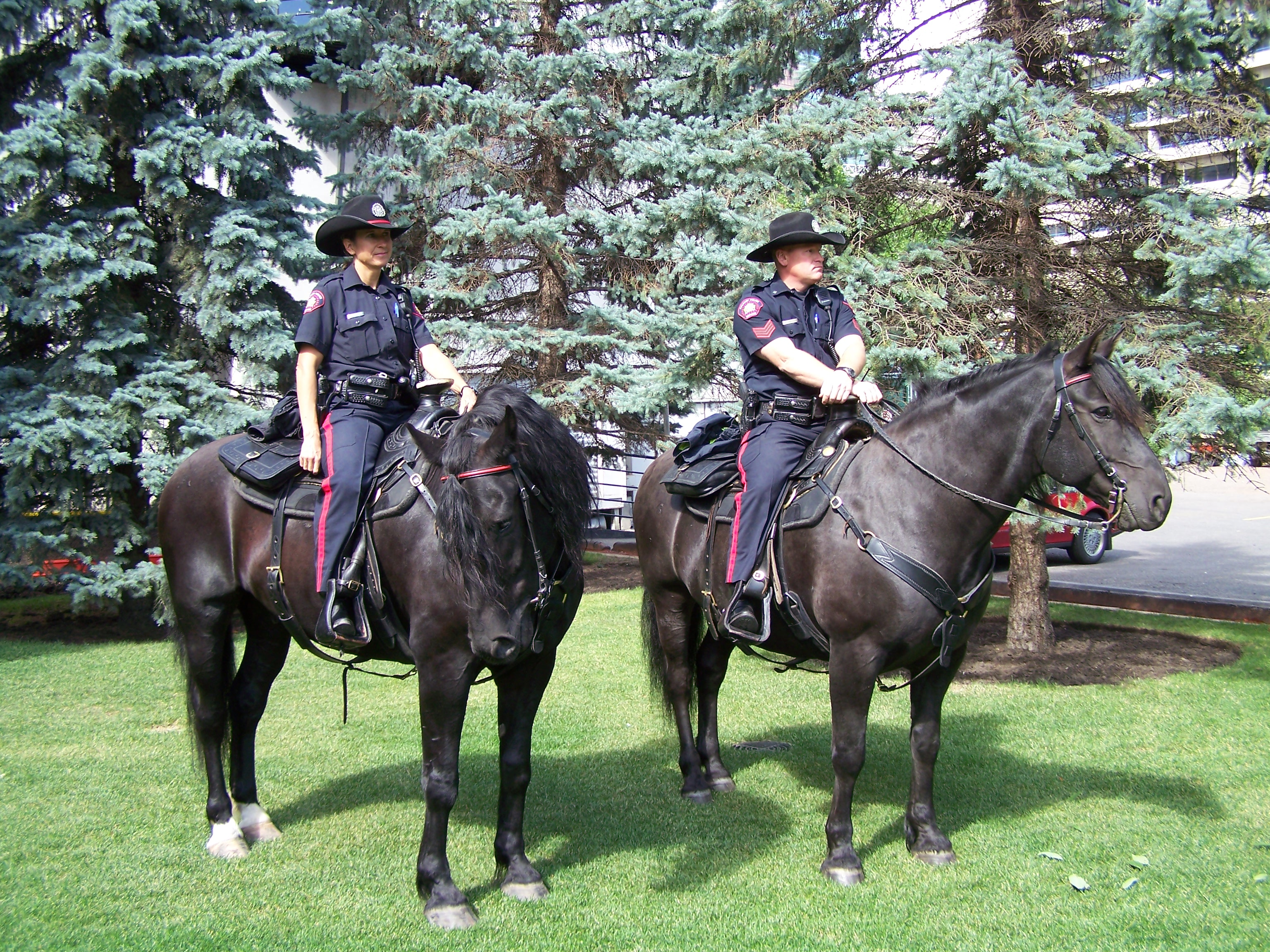
Mounted members of the Calgary Police Service

- Calgary Police Service
- Camrose Police Service
- Edmonton Police Service
- Lacombe Police Service
- Lethbridge Police Service
- Medicine Hat Police Service
- Taber Police Service
- Grande Prairie Police Service

=== Special constabularies ===
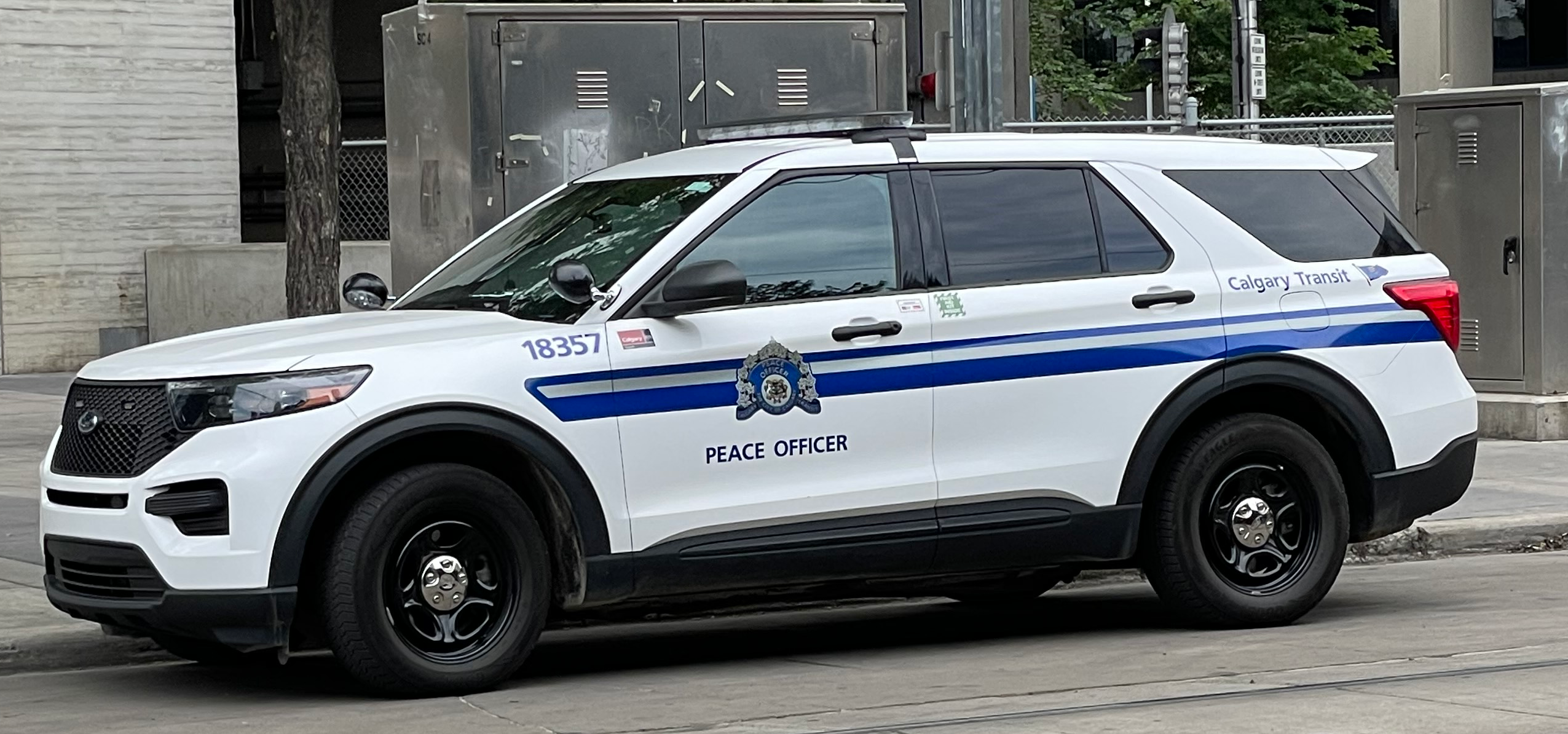
A Calgary Transit Peace Officer cruiser parked in downtown Calgary, Alberta.

- Alberta Health Services, Protective Services
- Covenant Health, Protective Services
- Calgary Transit Public Safety and Enforcement Section
- Edmonton Transit Protective Services
- University of Alberta Protective Services
- Northern Alberta Institute of Technology Protective Services
- Southern Alberta Institute of Technology Protective Services

=== Provincial law enforcement agencies ===
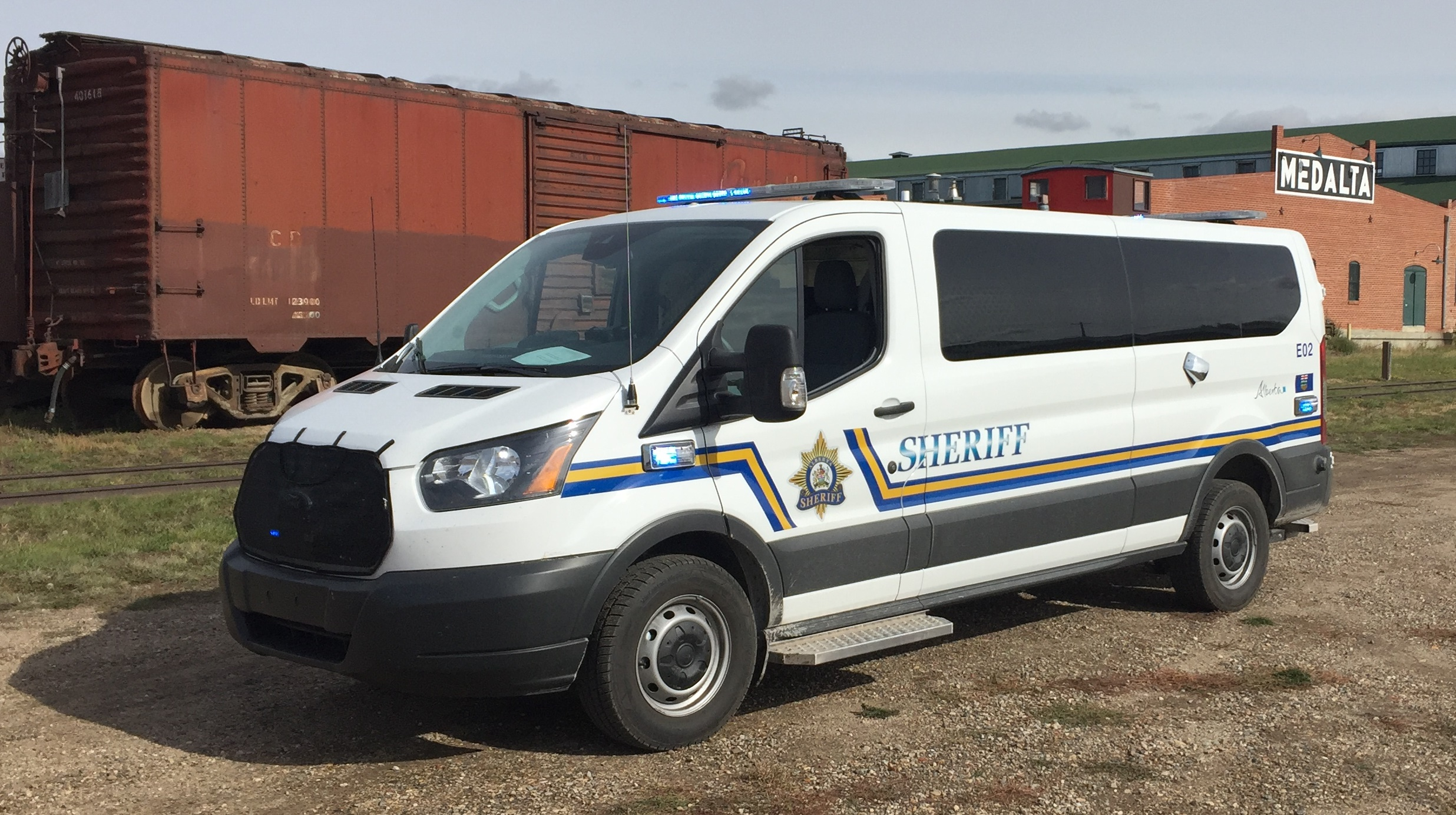
Alberta Sheriffs Branch prisoner transport van

- Alberta Sheriffs Police Service
- Alberta Forestry, Parks and Tourism, Conservation Officers
- Alberta Humane Society Peace Officers
- Alberta Correctional Services Division
- Alberta Environment and Parks - Environmental Protection Peace Officers
- Alberta Sheriffs Branch
  - Court Security Services (Law Court Sheriffs)
  - Protection and Transport Services (Legislative Security and Escort Sheriffs)
  - Investigative Services (SCAN, Fugitive Apprehension and Surveillance Investigators)
  - Alberta Sheriff Highway Patrol (Sheriff Highway Patrol Officers)
  - Alberta Fish and Wildlife Enforcement Services (Fish and Wildlife Officers)

=== Community peace officers ===
Community peace officers are law enforcement officers appointed by municipalities, regional sub divisions, educational institutions, and healthcare organizations.

The duties of a community peace officer varies depending on their appointment, which specifies which provincial laws the appointed community peace officer may enforce.

Uniquely, community peace officers employed by Alberta Health Services and Covenant Health are empowered to enforce the Mental Health Act. Powers under this act allow for the apprehension of individuals that the peace officer reasonably believes may be suffering from a mental disorder and is a danger to themselves and/or others.

Other common roles include but are not limited to traffic enforcement, enforcement of the trespass act and its provisions, as well as enforcement of alcohol and cannabis related legislation.

Peace officers are armed with a baton and OC spray, as well as body armour. Some peace officers are equipped with shotguns for dispatching wildlife.

Peace officers are not police officers and generally do not have the authority to conduct criminal investigations, however they may arrest people under the criminal code when someone is found committing an offence.

== British Columbia ==
=== Police services ===
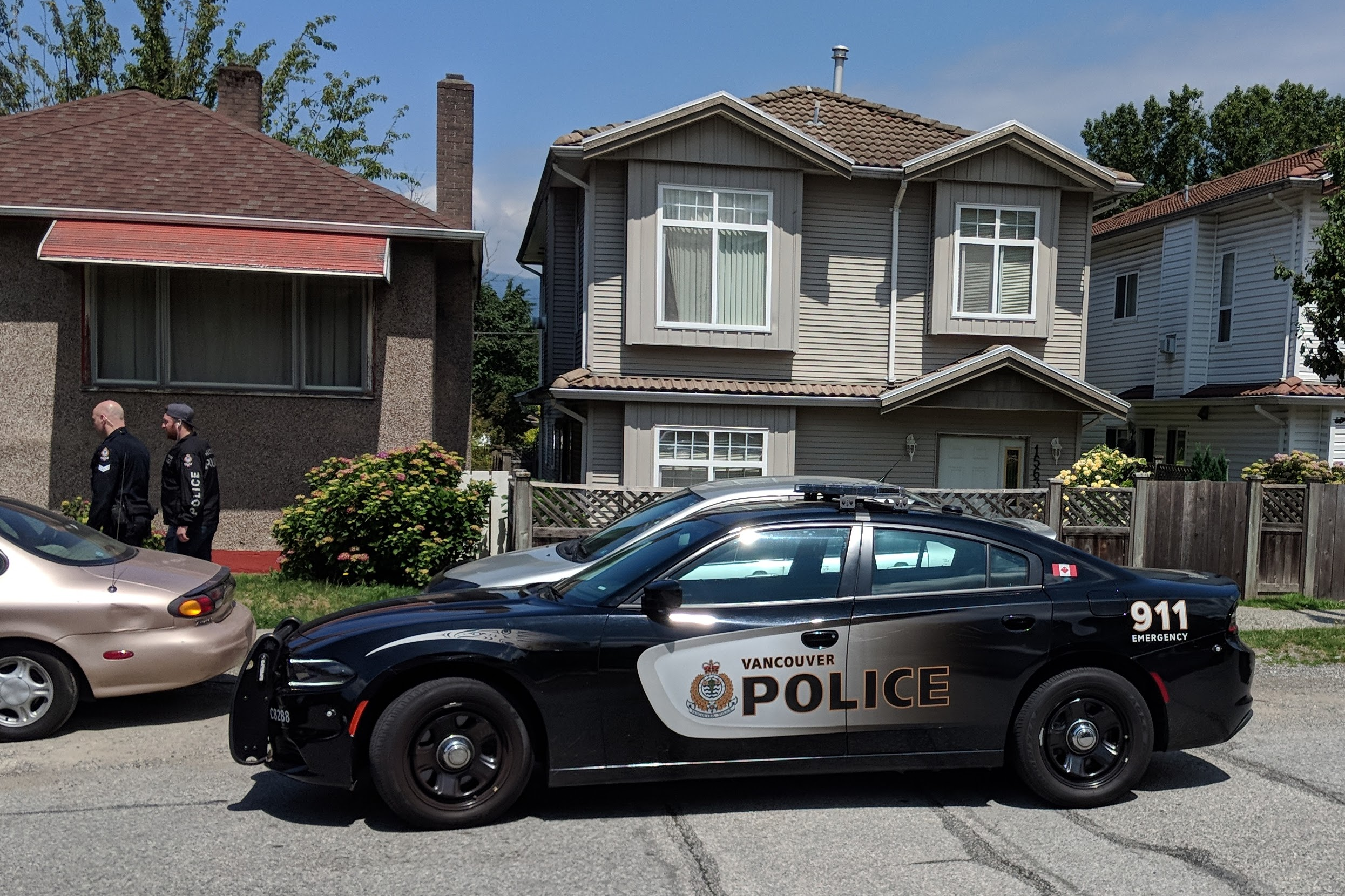
A Vancouver Police Department Dodge Charger PPV attends a call for service.

- Abbotsford Police Department
- Central Saanich Police Service
- Delta Police Department
- Nelson Police Department
- New Westminster Police Department
- Oak Bay Police Department
- Port Moody Police Department
- Saanich Police Department
- Surrey Police Service
- Vancouver Police Department
- Victoria Police Department
- West Vancouver Police Department

==== Designated Policing Units ====
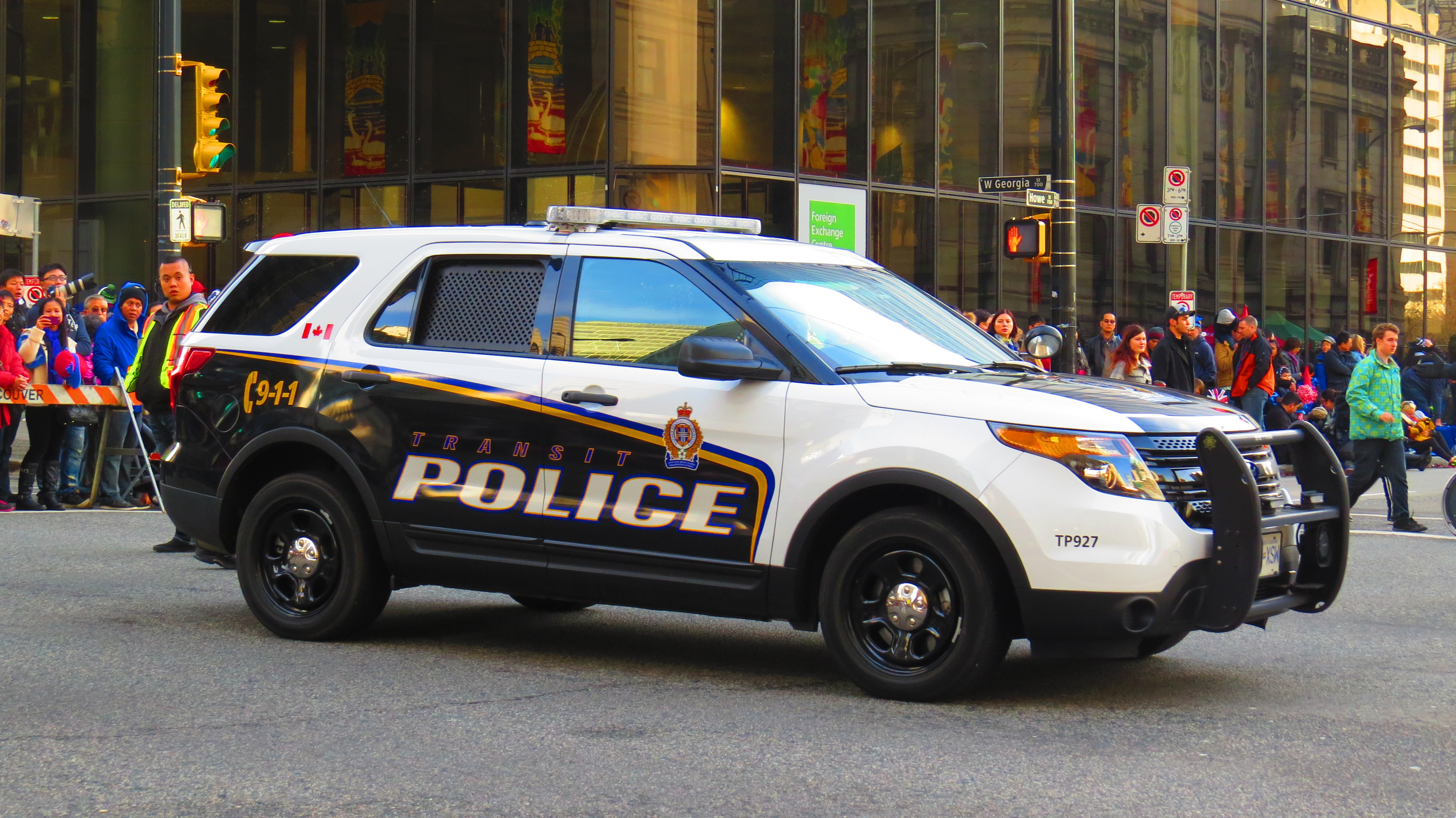
A Metro Vancouver Transit Police Ford Police Interceptor Utility on patrol.

In British Columbia, the Solicitor General may establish a "designated policing unit" to provide specialized police services in a geographic area alongside the police service(s) of jurisdiction. These forces answer to a board composed of representatives selected directly by the Solicitor General, and may include community representatives, representatives from area police services, or representatives from the corporations funding the designated policing unit's operations. There are three such units in the province:

- Organized Crime Agency of British Columbia
- Metro Vancouver Transit Police
- Stl’atl’imx Tribal Police Service

=== Special constabularies ===
- Legislative Assembly Protective Services

=== Civil law enforcement agencies ===
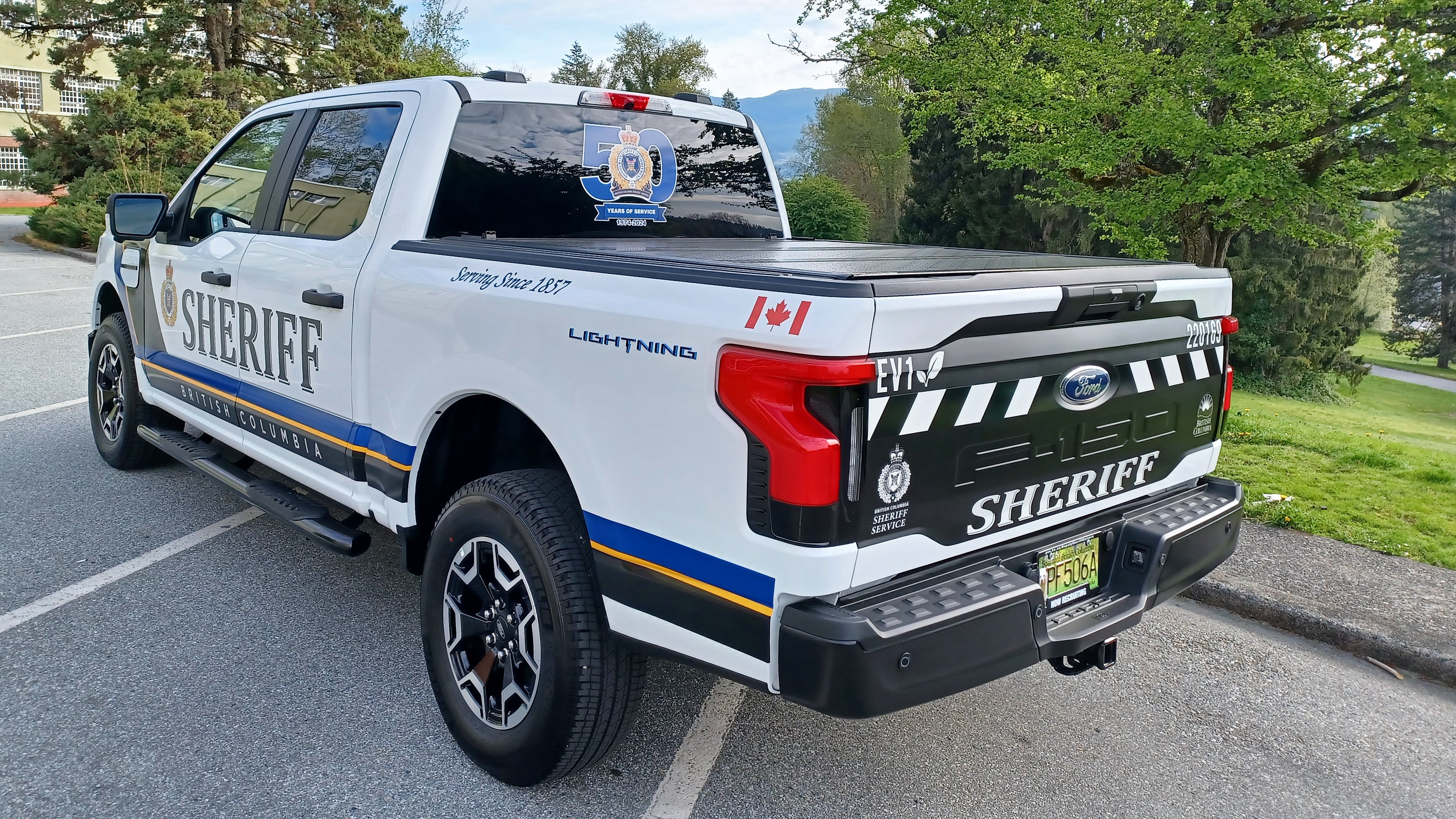
A British Columbia Sheriff Service Ford F-150 Lightning.

- British Columbia Commercial Vehicle Safety and Enforcement
- British Columbia Community Safety Unit
- British Columbia Conservation Officer Service
- Forensic Security Operations, Forensic Services Officers
- British Columbia Correctional Service
- British Columbia Natural Resources Officers
- British Columbia Park Rangers
- British Columbia Passenger Transportation Branch
- British Columbia Sheriff Service
- Independent Gambling Control Office British Columbia
- British Columbia Special Provincial Constables - Provincial Fraud Investigators

== Manitoba ==
=== Police services ===
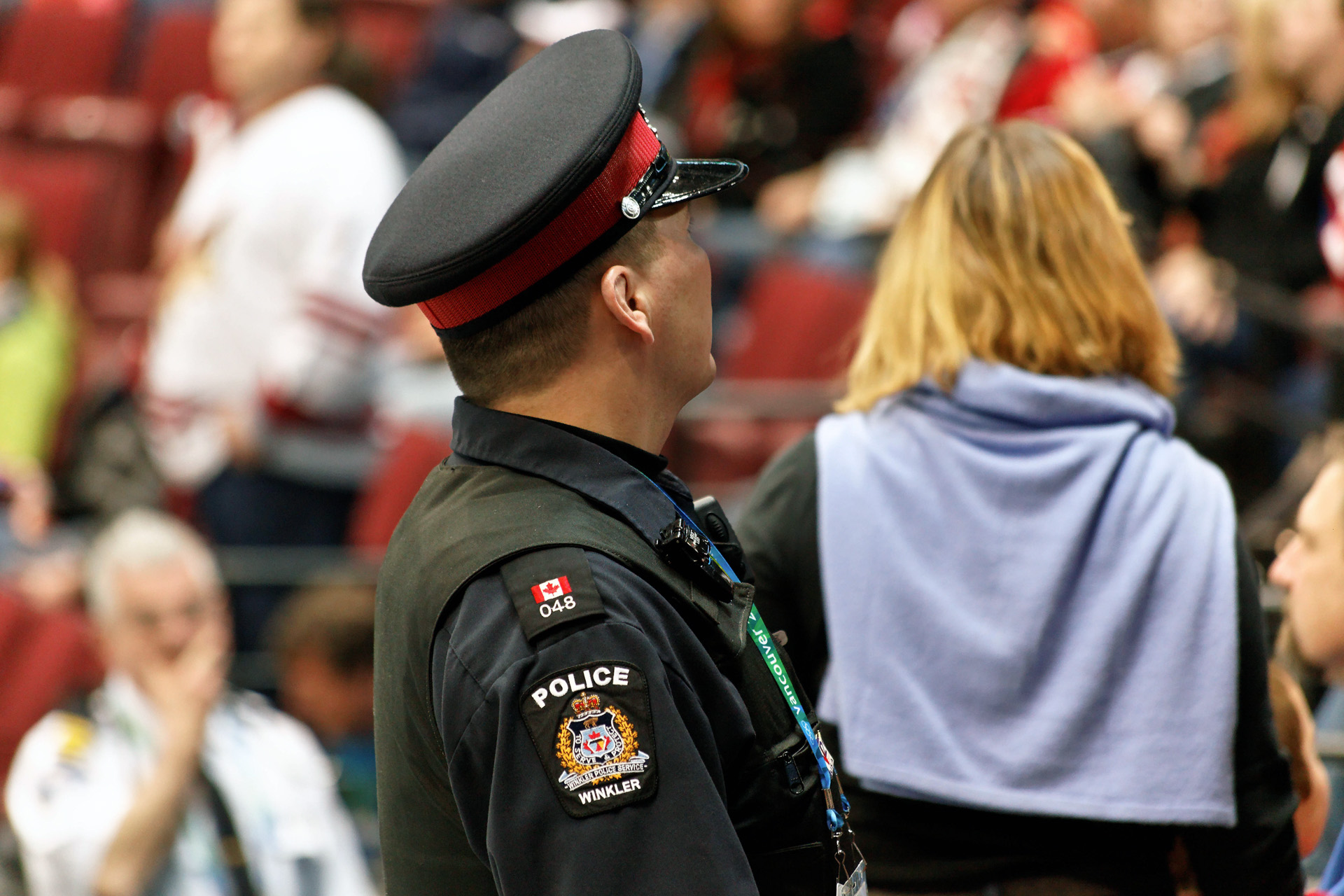
A Winkler Police officer surveys the crowd at the 2010 Vancouver Winter Olympics.

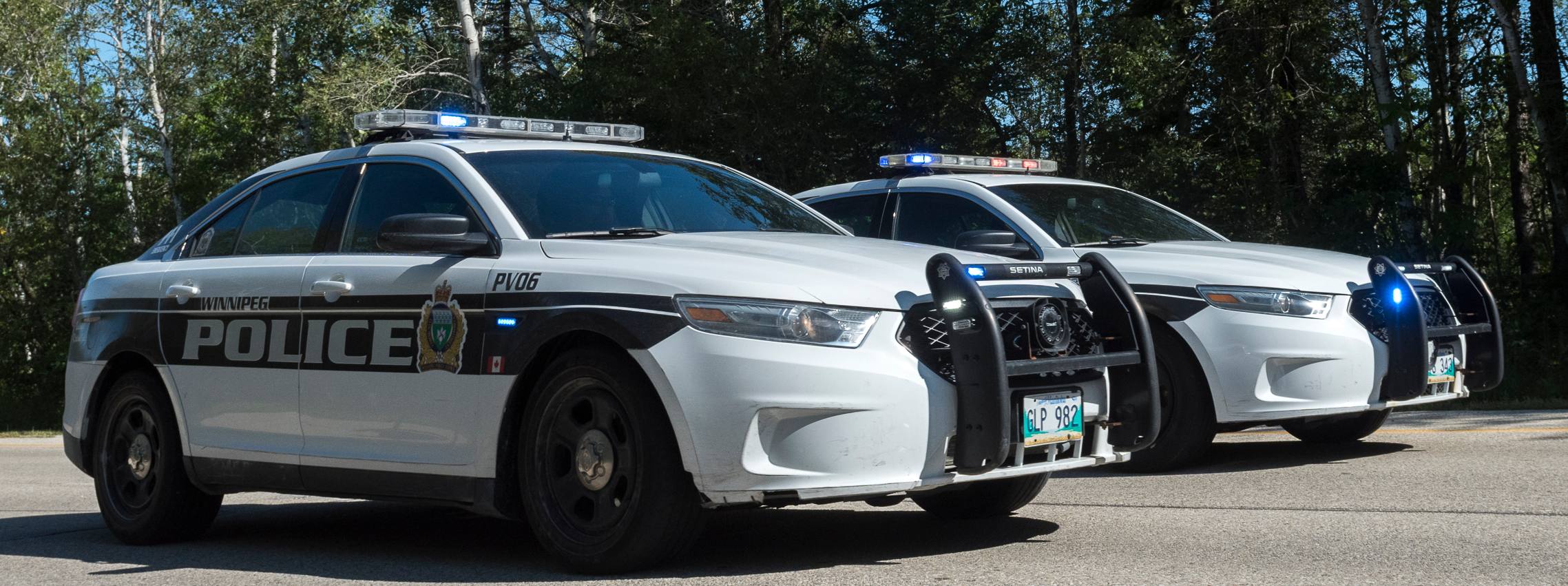
Two Winnipeg Police cruisers parked at the scene of an incident.

- Altona Police Service
- Brandon Police Service
- Morden Police Service
- RM of Cornwallis Police Service
- Sainte-Anne Police Service
- Springfield Police Service
- Victoria Beach Police
- Winkler Police Service
- Winnipeg Police Service

=== Special constabularies ===
- University of Manitoba Campus Safety and Security (Institutional Safety Officers)
- Winnipeg Transit Safety Officers (Institutional Safety Officers)

=== Civil law enforcement agencies ===
- Manitoba Conservation Officers Service
- Manitoba Sheriff Service
- Manitoba Motor Carrier Enforcement Highway Patrol
- Natural Resource Officer Service
- Manitoba Corrections

== New Brunswick ==
=== Police services ===
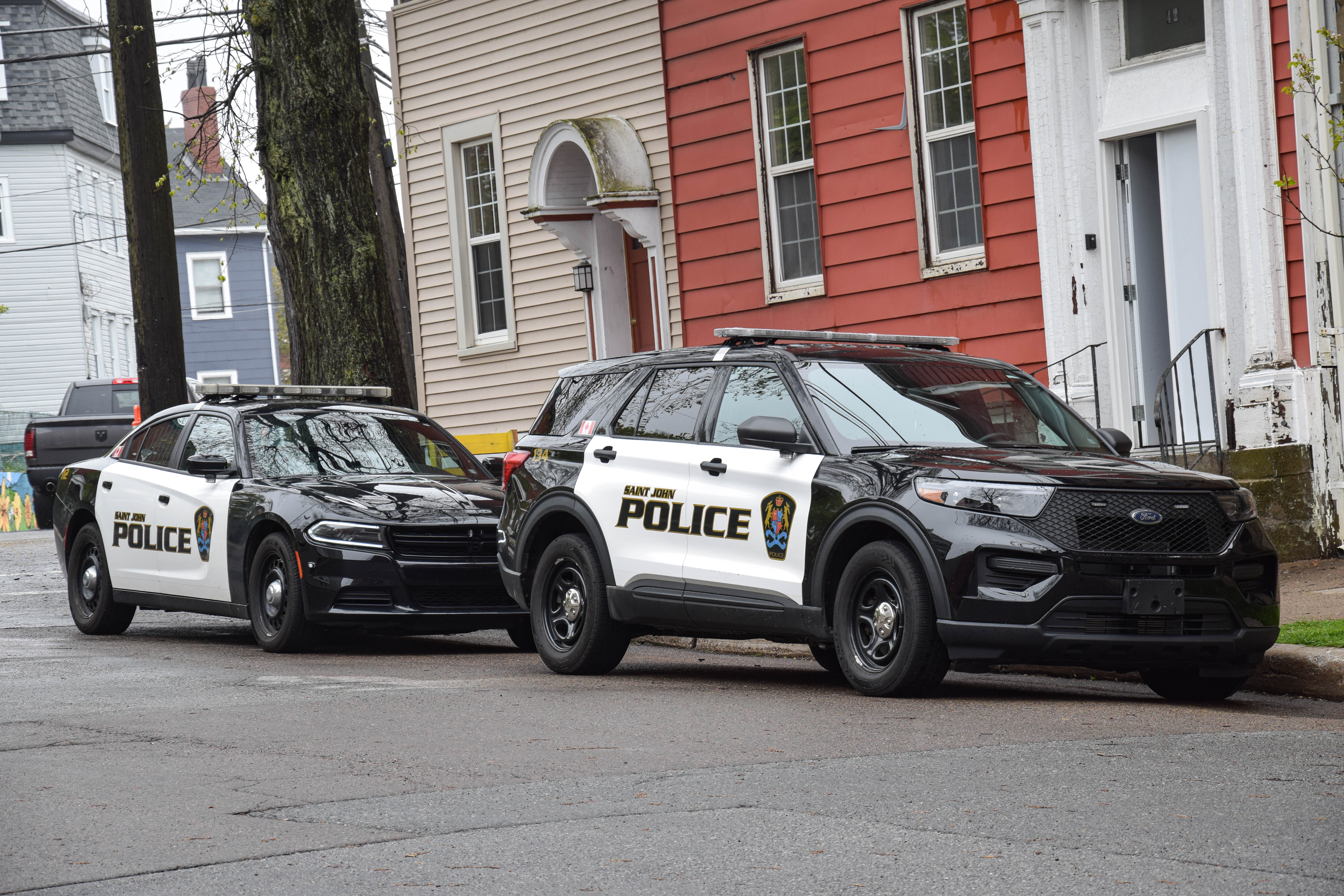
Two Saint John Police Force cruisers at a call for service.

- Bathurst City Police Service
- Beresford, Nigadoo, Petit-Rocher and Pointe-Verte Regional Police Service (B.N.P.P. Regional Police Service)
- Edmundston Police Force
- Fredericton Police Force
- Grand Falls Police Force
- Kennebecasis Regional Police Force
- Miramichi Police Force
- Saint John Police Force
- Woodstock Police Force

=== Civil law enforcement agencies ===
- Department of Public Safety
  - Conservation Enforcement
  - Highway Safety Patrol
  - Health Protection Services
- New Brunswick Sheriff’s Service
- Correctional Services
- Coroner's Service

== Newfoundland and Labrador ==
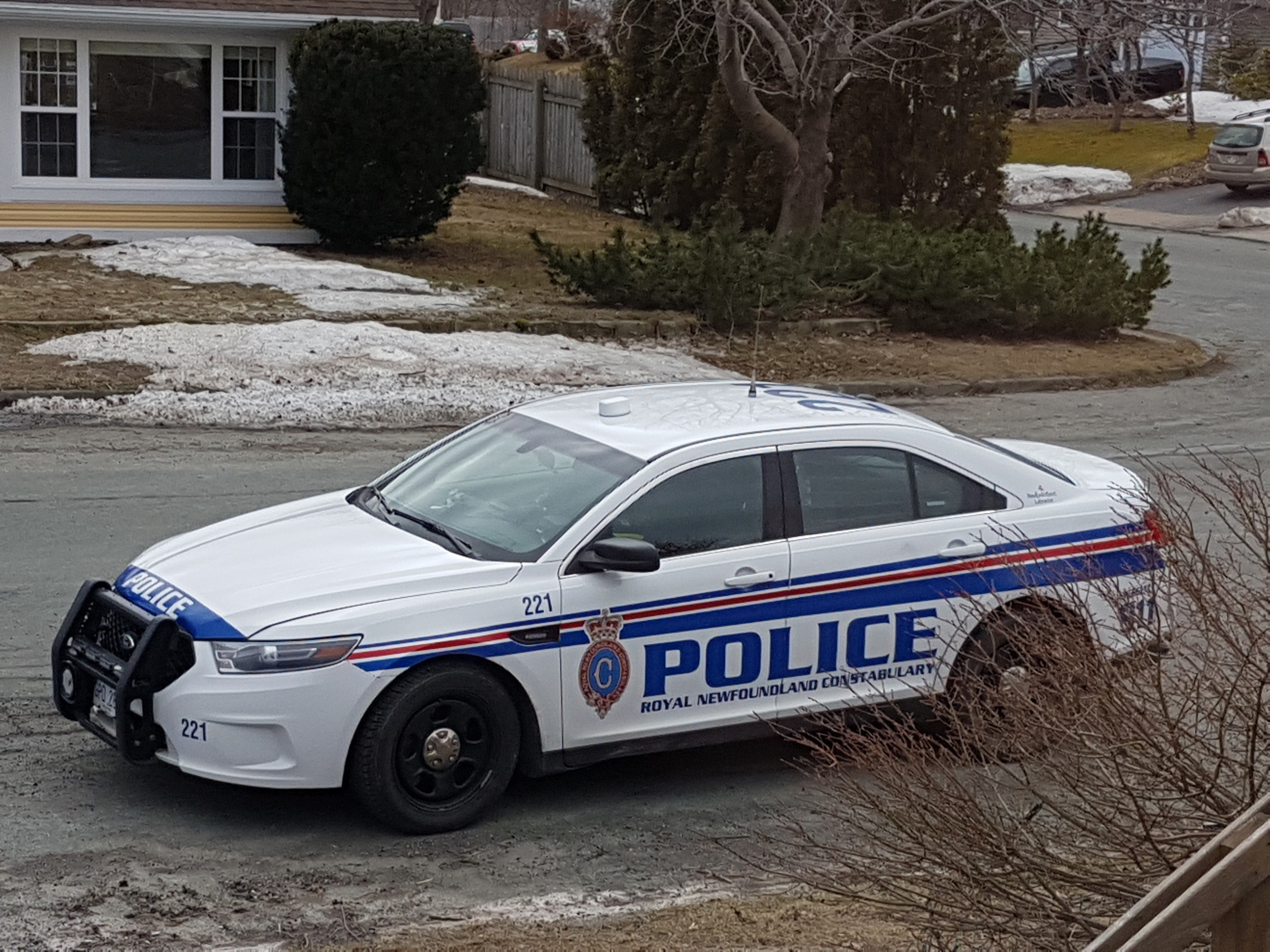
A Royal Newfoundland Constabulary cruiser at a call for service.

=== Police services ===
- Royal Newfoundland Constabulary

=== Special constabularies ===
- Memorial University Campus Enforcement and Patrol

=== Civil law enforcement agencies ===
- High Sheriff of Newfoundland and Labrador
- Newfoundland and Labrador Fish and Wildlife Enforcement
- Newfoundland and Labrador Corrections

== Northwest Territories ==
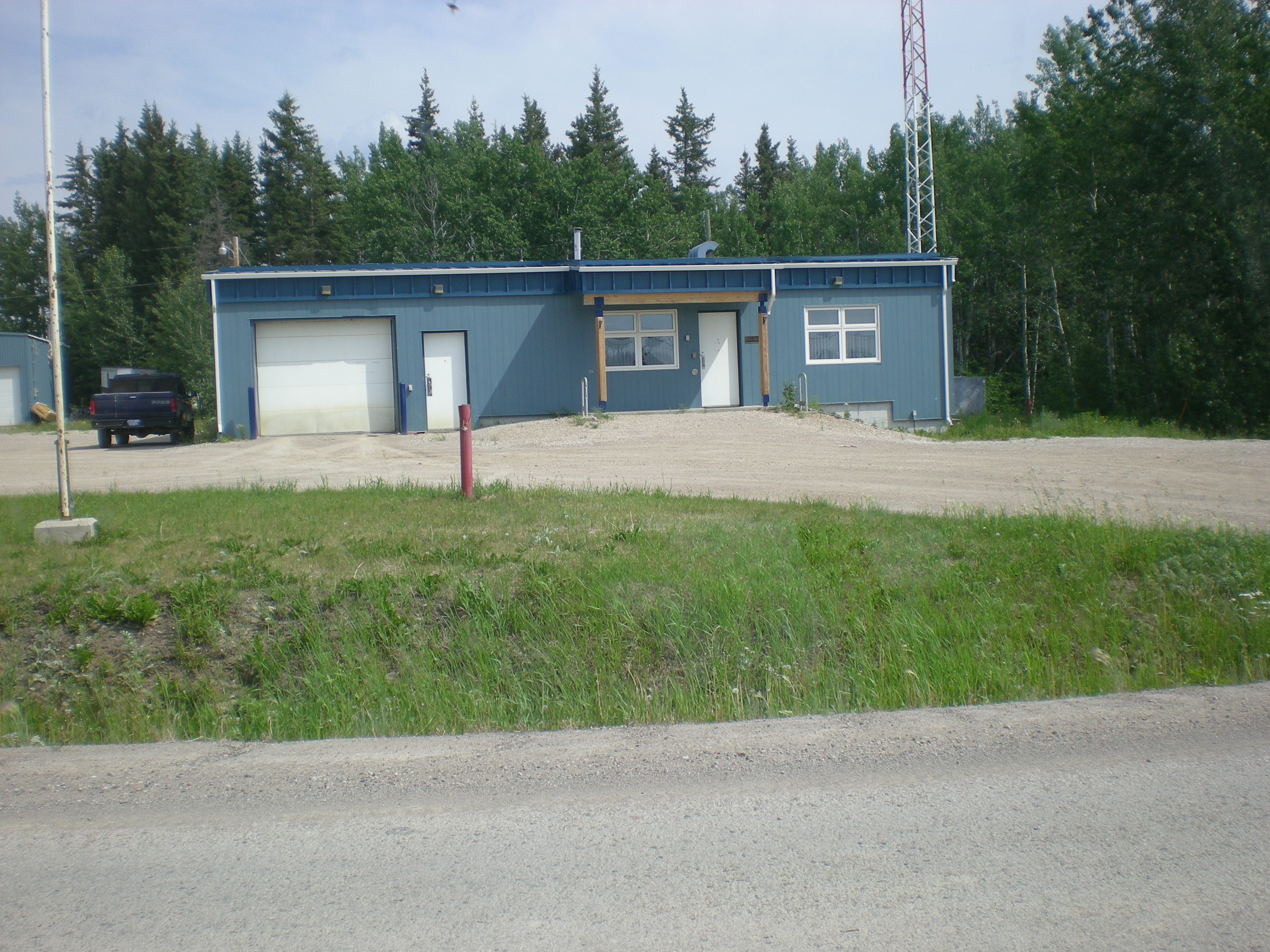
The RCMP detachment in Fort Providence, NWT.

=== Civil law enforcement agencies ===
- Northwest Territories Highway Patrol
- Northwest Territories Renewable Resources Officer Service
- Northwest Territories Parks Officer Service
- Northwest Territories Sheriff Service
- Northwest Territories Corrections Service

== Nova Scotia ==
=== Police services ===
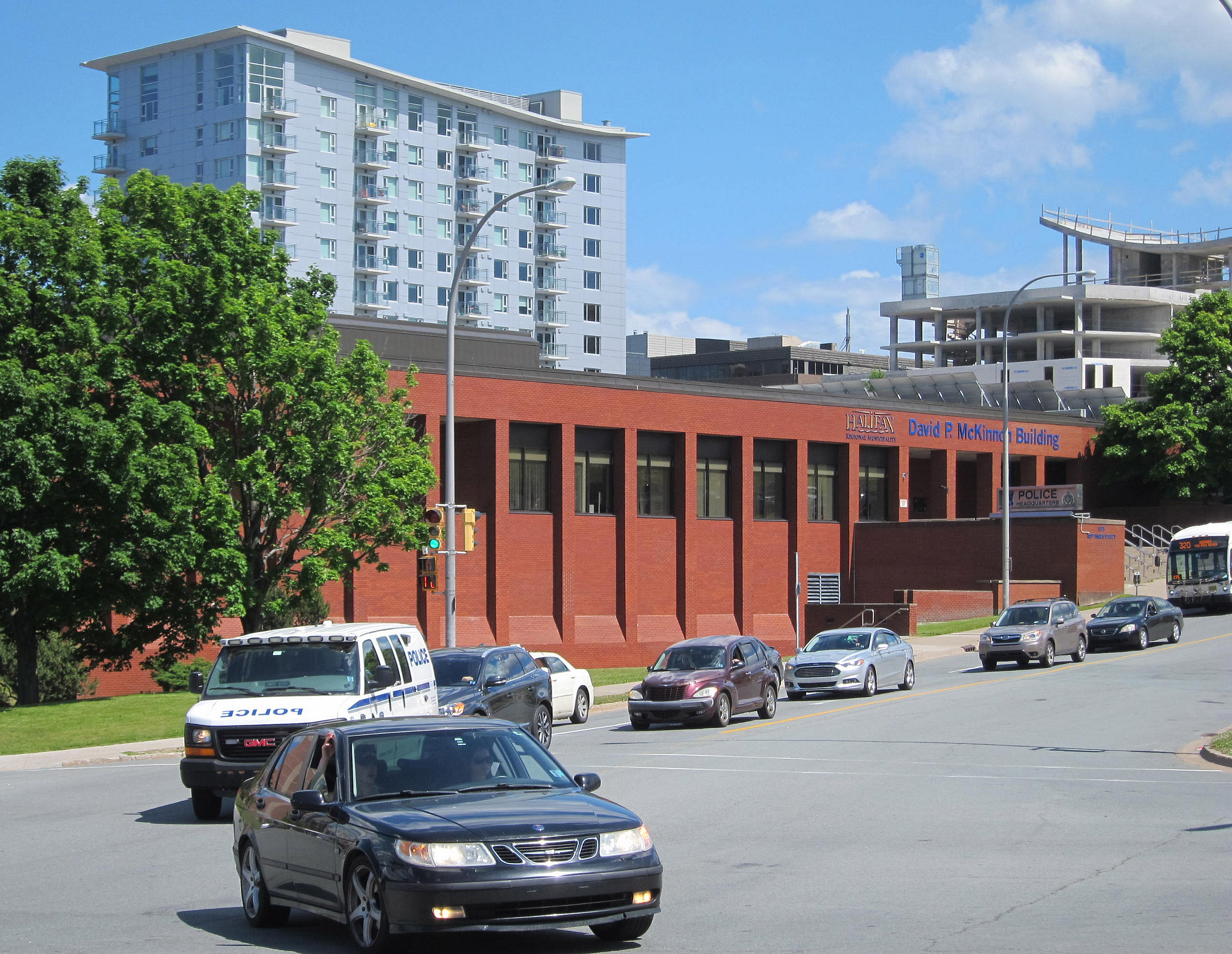
Halifax Regional Police headquarters.

- Amherst Police Department
- Annapolis Royal Police Department
- Bridgewater Police Service
- Cape Breton Regional Police Service
- Halifax Regional Police
- Kentville Police Service
- New Glasgow Regional Police Service
- Stellarton Police Service
- Truro Police Service
- Westville Police Service

=== Civil law enforcement agencies ===
- Nova Scotia Sheriff Service
- Nova Scotia Vehicle Transportation Inspection
- Nova Scotia Conservation Enforcement
- Nova Scotia Farm Animal Health & Welfare
- Nova Scotia Society for the Prevention of Cruelty to Animals
- Child Welfare Services
- Adult Protection Services
- Nova Scotia Correctional Service

== Nunavut Territory ==
=== Civil law enforcement agencies ===
- Iqaluit Municipal Enforcement
- Nunavut Sheriff’s Office

== Ontario ==
=== Police services ===
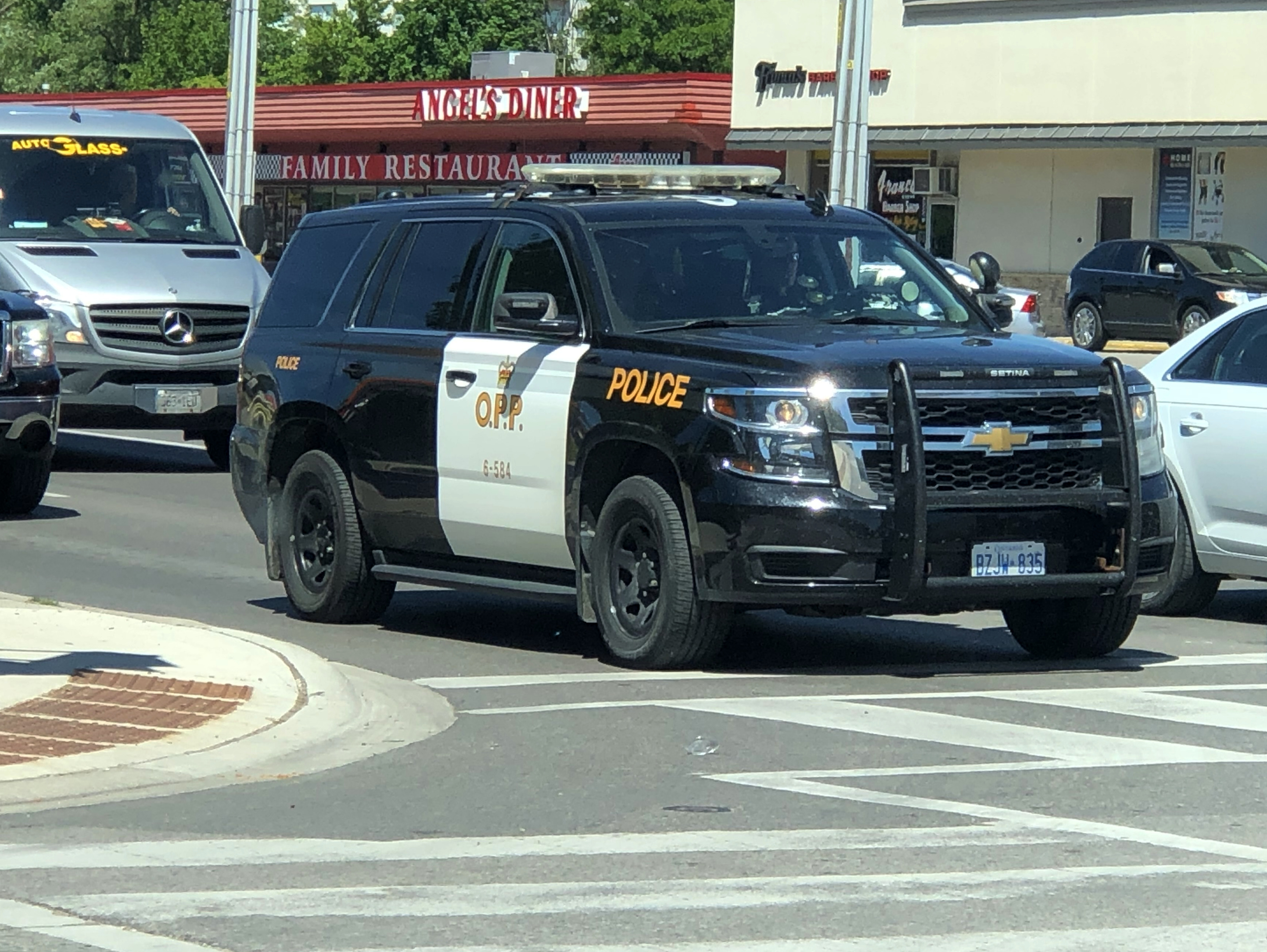
An Ontario Provincial Police Chevrolet Tahoe on patrol in Guelph.

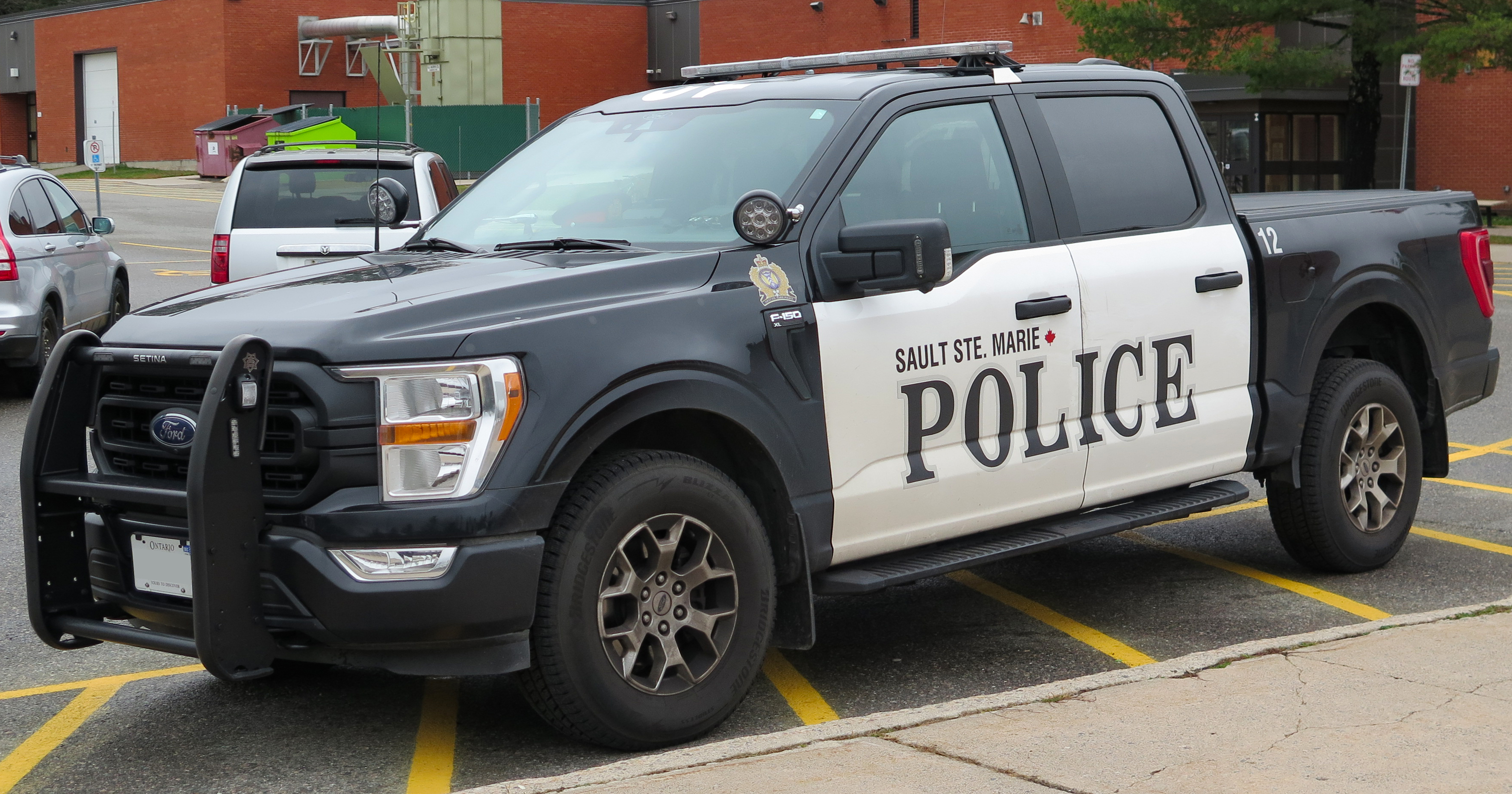
A Sault Ste. Marie Police Service Ford F-150.

- Ontario Provincial Police
- Aylmer Police Service
- Barrie Police Service
- Belleville Police Service
- Brantford Police Service
- Brockville Police Service
- Chatham-Kent Police Service
- Cobourg Police Service
- Cornwall Community Police Service
- Deep River Police Service
- Durham Regional Police Service
- Gananoque Police Service
- Greater Sudbury Police Service
- Guelph Police Service
- Halton Regional Police Service
- Hamilton Police Service
- Hanover Police Service
- Kawartha Lakes Police Service
- Kingston Police Force
- LaSalle Police Service
- London Police Service
- Niagara Regional Police Service
- North Bay Police Service
- Ottawa Police Service
- Owen Sound Police Service
- Peel Regional Police
- Peterborough Police Service
- Port Hope Police Service
- St. Thomas Police Service
- Sarnia Police Service
- Saugeen Shores Police Service
- Sault Ste. Marie Police Service
- Smiths Falls Police Service
- South Simcoe Police Service
- Stratford Police Service
- Strathroy-Caradoc Police Service
- Thunder Bay Police Service
- Timmins Police Service
- Toronto Police Service
- Waterloo Regional Police Service
- West Grey Police Service
- Windsor Police Service
- Woodstock Police Service
- York Regional Police

=== Special constabularies ===
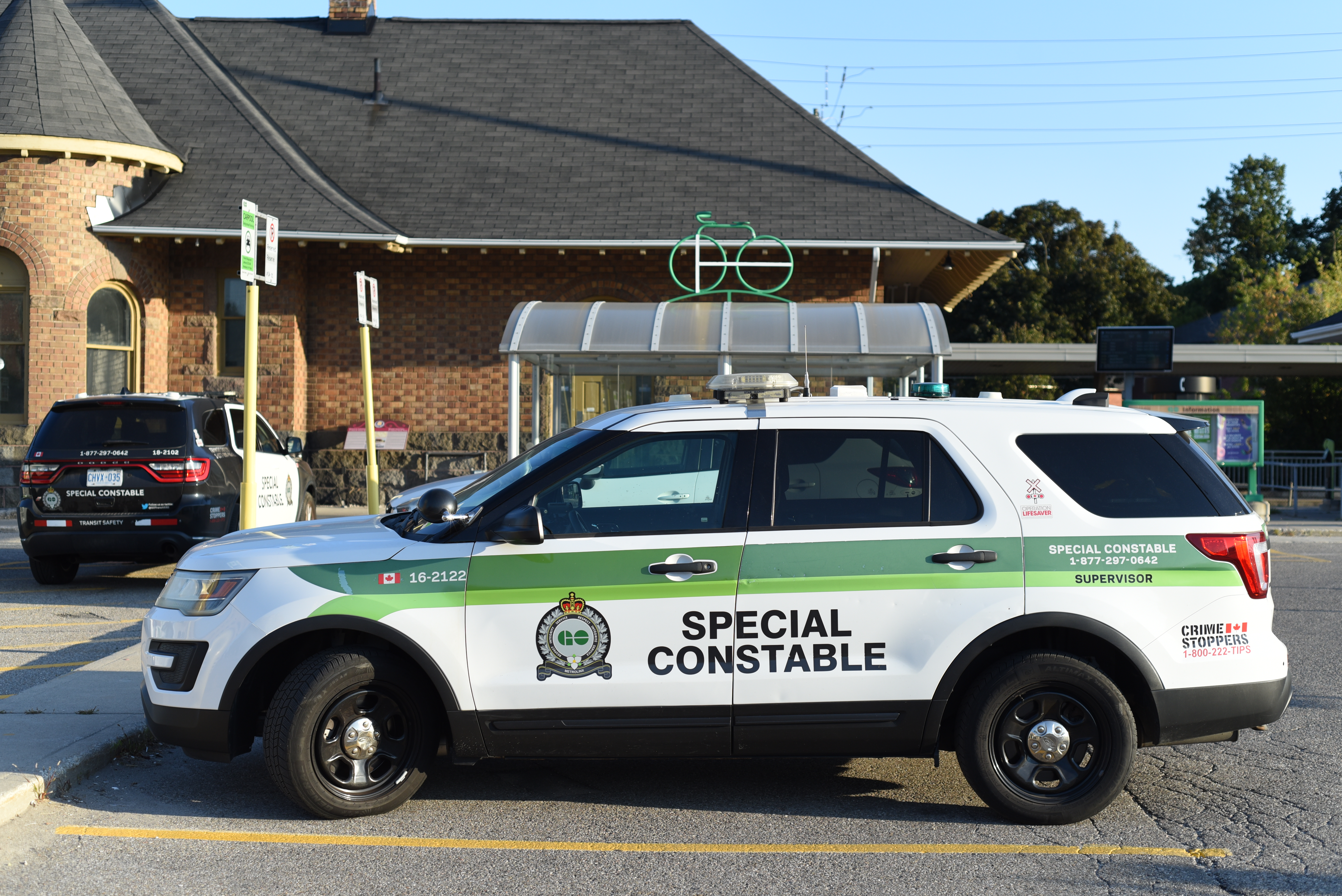
GO Transit Safety vehicle in Brampton, Ontario

- Niagara Parks Police Service
- GO Transit Customer Protection
- Toronto Transit Commission Transit Enforcement Unit
- OC Transpo Special Constable Unit
- York Region Transit Enforcement and Security
- Toronto Community Housing Special Constables
- University of Toronto Campus Safety
- Brock University Campus Security Services
- Carleton University Campus Safety Services
- Fanshawe College Campus Security Services
- McMaster University Security Services
- University of Western Ontario Campus Safety and Emergency Services
- University of Windsor Special Constable Service
- Wilfrid Laurier University Special Constable Service
- University of Waterloo Special Constable Service
- Legislative Protective Service

=== Civil law enforcement agencies ===
- Ontario Ministry of the Solicitor General
  - Correctional Officers
  - Animal Welfare Inspectors
- Ontario Ministry of the Environment, Conservation and Parks
  - Environmental Officers
  - Provincial Park Wardens
- Ontario Ministry of Health and Long-Term Care, Tobacco Enforcement Officers (through Public Health Units)
- Ontario Ministry of Finance, Fuel and Tobacco Tax Inspectors
- Ontario Ministry of Natural Resources and Forestry, Conservation Officers
- Ontario Ministry of Transportation, Transportation Enforcement Officers (Commercial Vehicles)
- Ontario Ministry of the Attorney General, Court Enforcement Officers (Sheriff)
- Ontario Ministry of Labour, Immigration, Training and Skills Development
  - Occupational Health and Safety Inspectors
  - Employment Standards Officers
- MiWay (Mississauga Transit) Enforcement Unit

== Prince Edward Island ==
=== Police services ===
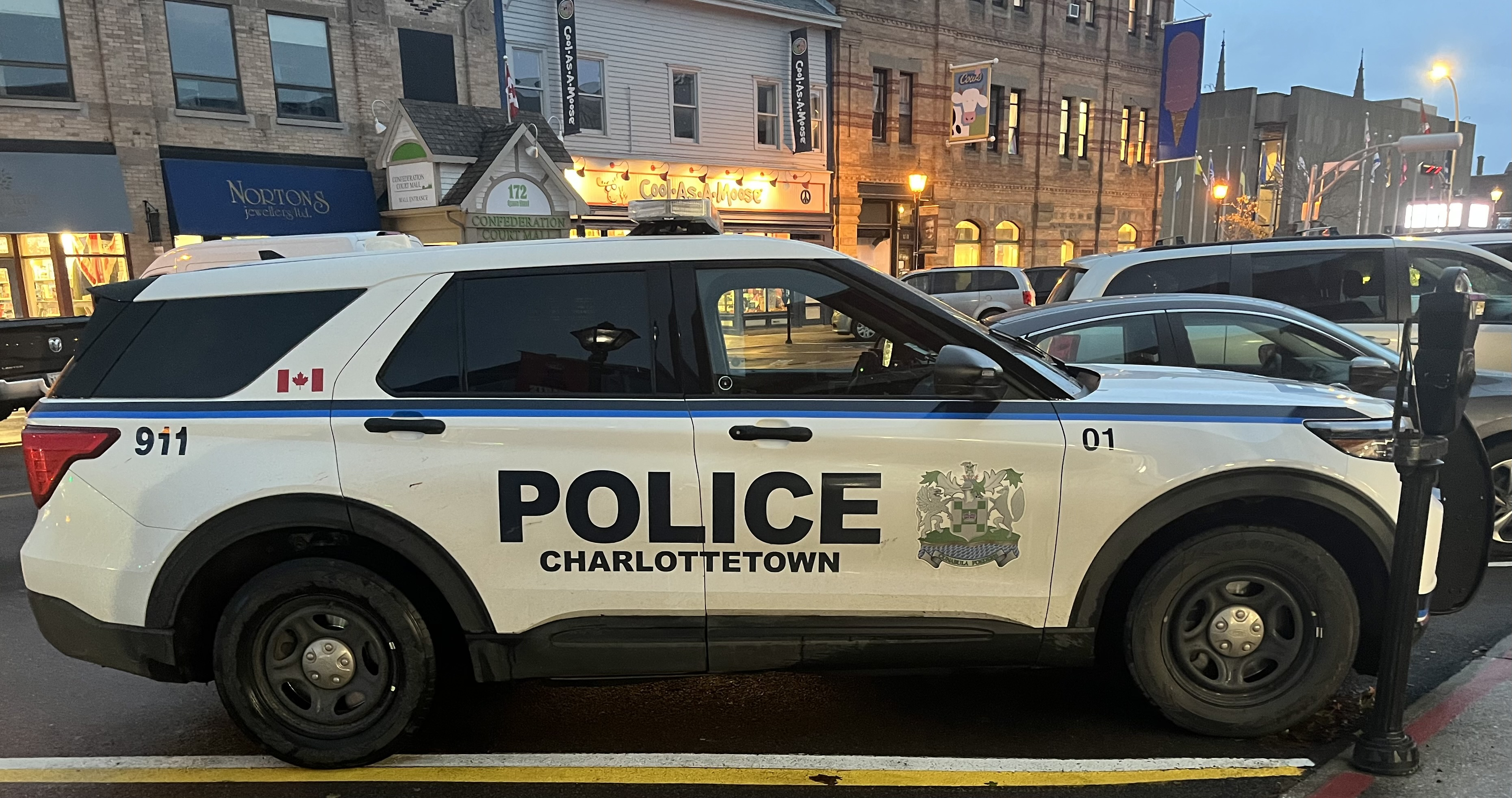
A patrol car of the Charlottetown, Prince Edward Island Police.

- Charlottetown Police Service
- Summerside Police Department
- Kensington Police Service

=== Civil law enforcement agencies ===
- Prince Edward Island Conservation Officers
- Prince Edward Island Department of Corrections
- Prince Edward Island Fire Marshals Office
- Prince Edward Island Highway Safety (Commercial Vehicle Enforcement)
- Prince Edward Island Sheriff Services
- Prince Edward Island Humane Society - Animal Protection Officers
- Prince Edward Island Department of Agriculture - Animal Protection Officers
- Health PEI - Environmental Health Officers
- Workers Compensation Board of PEI - Occupational Heath and Safety Officers
- Prince Edward Island Liquor Control Commission - Liquor Inspectors

== Quebec ==
=== Police services ===
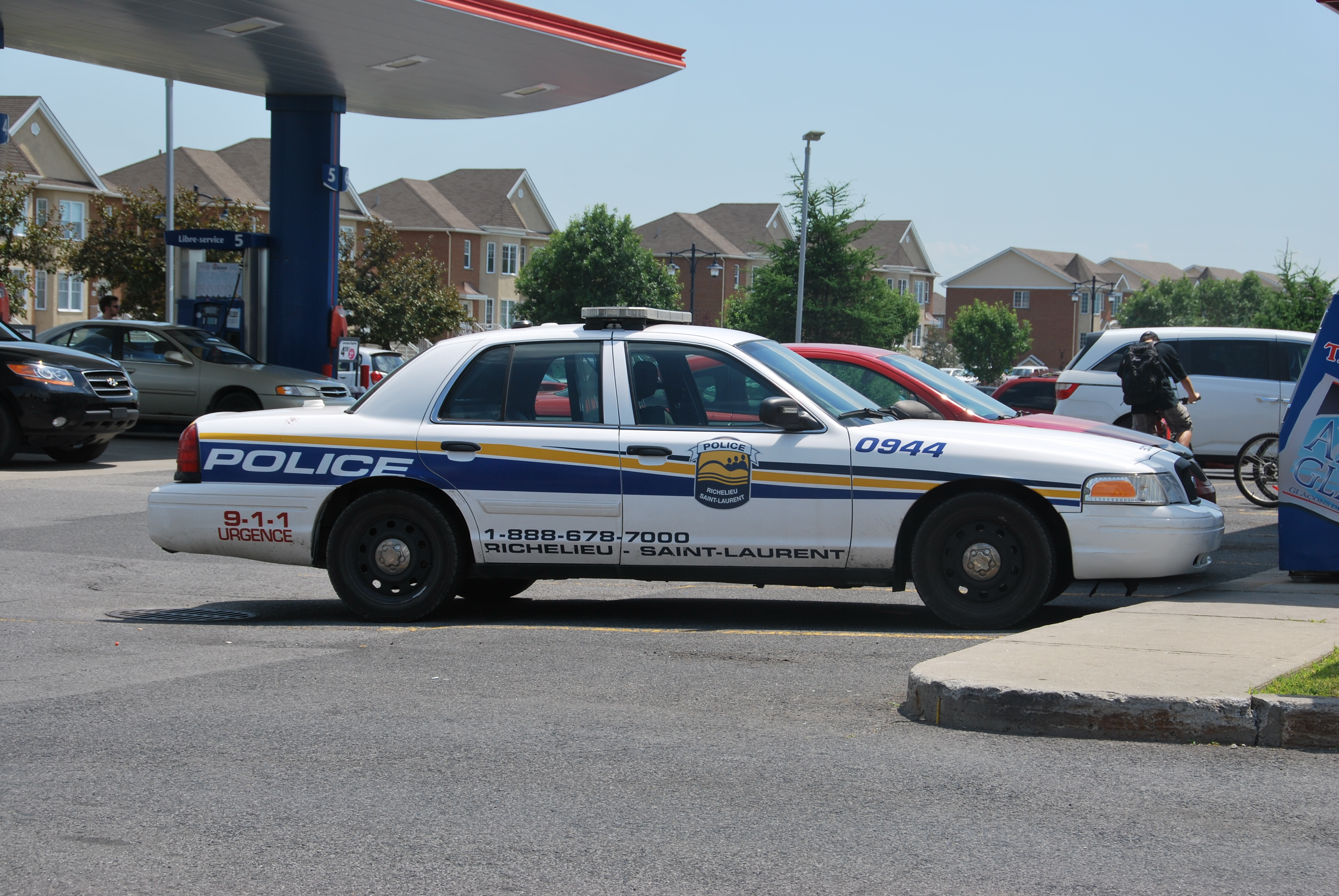
A Richelieu-Saint-Laurent police car

- Sûreté du Québec
- Bureau des enquêtes indépendantes
- Service de police de la Ville de Montréal
- Service de police de la Ville de Québec
- Service de police de la Ville de Gatineau
- Service de police de la Ville de Laval
- Service de police de l'agglomération de Longueuil
- Service de police de la Ville de Blainville
- Service de police de Châteauguay
- Régie de police de Lac des Deux-Montagnes
- Service de police de l'Assomption/St-Sulpice
- Service de police de la Ville de Lévis
- Service de la sécurité publique Ville de Mascouche
- Service de police de Mercier
- Service de police de Mirabel
- Service de police de la MRC des Collines-de-l'Outaouais
- Service de sécurité publique de la Ville de Repentigny
- Régie intermunicipale de police Richelieu-Saint-Laurent
- Régie intermunicipale de police de Roussillon
- Service de sécurité publique de Saguenay
- Sécurité publique de Saint-Eustache
- Service de police de la Ville de Sherbrooke
- Service de police de Terrebonne
- Régie intermunicipale de police de Thérèse-de-Blainville
- Service de sécurité publique de Trois-Rivières
- Service de police de la Ville de Bromont
- Service de police de la Ville de Granby
- Régie de police de Memphrémagog
- Service de police de Saint-Jean-sur-Richelieu
- Service de police de la Ville de Saint-Jérôme

=== Special constabularies ===
- Sûreté des réseaux de la Société de transport de Montréal (Transit Special Constables)
- Université de Montréal Le Bureau de la Sûreté
- Assemblée Nationale du Québec Constable Spécial

=== Civil law enforcement agencies ===
- Service de la protection de la faune
- Contrôle Routier Québec
- Direction de la sécurité dans les palais de justice
- Bureau du taxi de Montréal
- Sécurité publique des arrondissements et Villes liées de Montréal
- Bureau de la lutte contre le tabagisme Québec
- Enquête SPCA
- MAPAQ
- Enquête Contrôle animalier Montreal
- Enquête Hydro Québec

== Saskatchewan ==
=== Police services ===
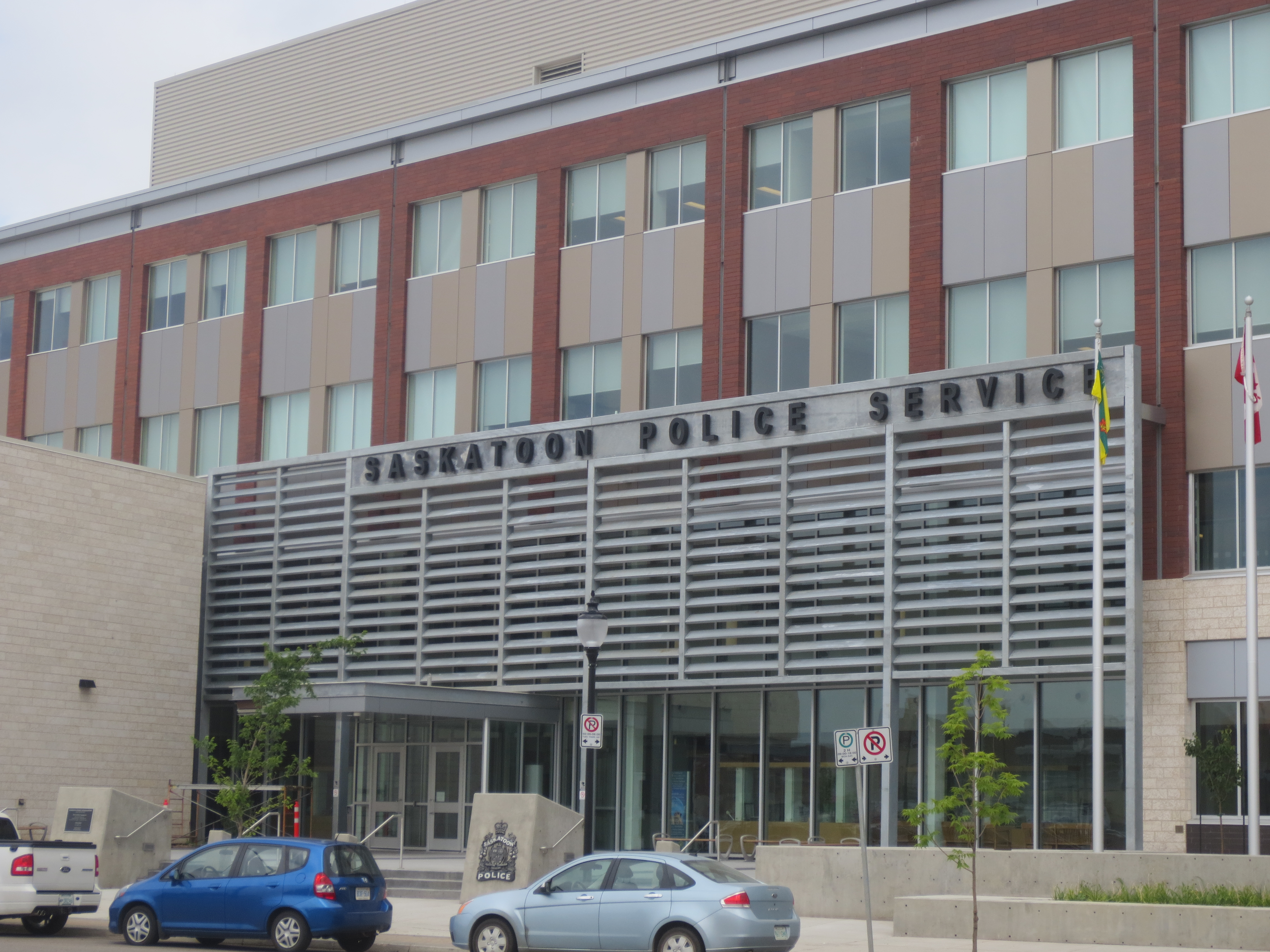
Saskatoon Police Service headquarters.

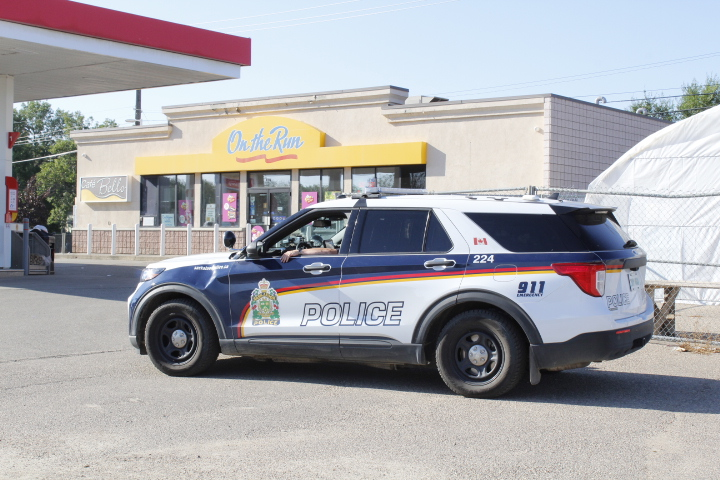
A Saskatoon police cruiser on patrol.

- Saskatchewan Marshals Service (SMS)
- Corman Park Police Service
- Dalmeny Police Service
- Estevan Police Service
- Luseland Police Service
- Moose Jaw Police Service
- Prince Albert Police Service
- Regina Police Service
- Saskatoon Police Service
- Vanscoy Police Service
- Weyburn Police Service

=== Special constabularies ===
- Legislature District Security Unit
- Candle Lake Regional Special Constable Service
- University of Saskatchewan Protective Services
- Wascana Community Safety Officers (Regina)
- North Battleford Community Safety Officers
- Saskatchewan Heath Authority Protective Services (Peace Officer)

=== Civil law enforcement agencies ===
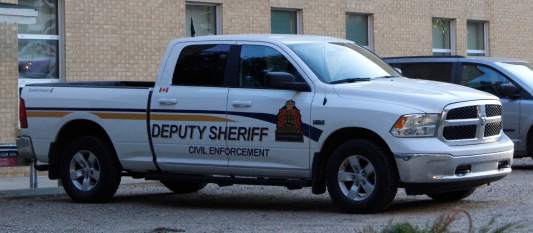
A Saskatchewan Deputy Sheriff Civil Enforcement RAM 1500 in Saskatoon.

- Saskatchewan Firearms Office
- Saskatchewan Corrections
- Animal Protection Officers
- Provincial Protective Services Branch
  - Saskatchewan Highway Patrol
  - Saskatchewan Deputy Sheriffs Service
  - Saskatchewan Conservation Officers
  - Wascana Community Safety Officers
  - Safer Communities and Neighbourhoods (SCAN)

== Yukon Territory ==
=== Civil law enforcement agencies ===
- Yukon Highway & Public Works - Carrier Compliance Division
- Yukon Sheriffs Office
- Yukon Conservation Officer Service

== Indigenous police ==
=== Alberta ===
- Blood Tribe Police Service
- North Peace Tribal Police Service
- Lakeshore Regional Police Service
- Tsuu T'ina Nation Police Service
- Siksika Nation Police Service

=== British Columbia ===
- Stl’atl’imx Tribal Police Service

=== Manitoba ===
- Manitoba First Nation Police Services - MFNPS (Formally: Dakota Ojibway Police Services - DOPS) serves the following areas:

- Long Plain First Nation, Sandy Bay First Nation, Swan Lake First Nation, Birdtail Sioux First Nation, Canupawakpa Dakota Nation, Roseau River Anishinabe First Nation, Waywayseecappo First Nation and Opaskwayak Cree Nation.

=== Ontario ===
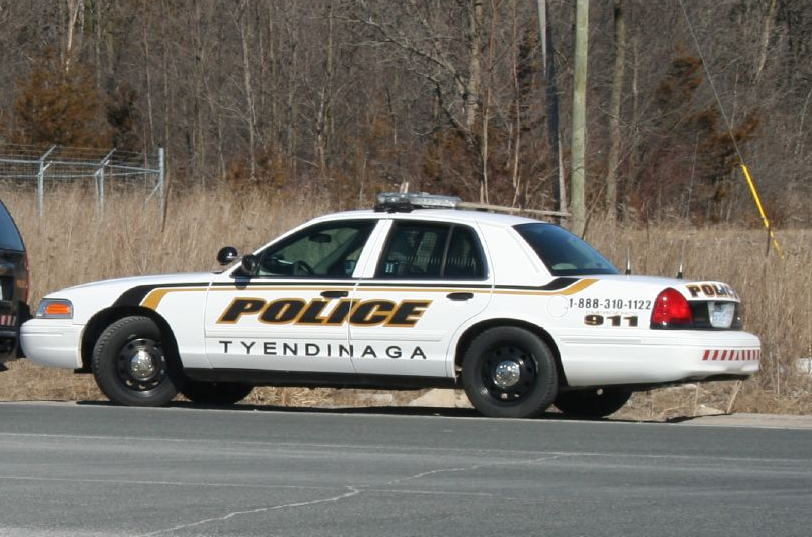
A cruiser from the OPP-administered Tyendinaga Police Service.

==== Self-administered police services ====
- Akwesasne Mohawk Police
- Anishinabek Police Service
- Lac-Seul Police Service
- Nishnawbe-Aski Police Service
- Rama Police Service
- Six Nations Police Service
- Treaty Three Police Service
- U.C.C.M Anishnaabe Police Service
- Wikwemikong Police Service

==== OPP-administered police services ====
The OPP administers OFNPA funding and provides administrative support for First Nations whose choice of policing arrangement under the federal First Nations Policing Program takes one of two forms: an OPP-administered OFNPA option; or OPP policing under a Stream Two Agreement.

- Atikameksheng Anishnawbek (White Fish Lake) Police
- Batchewana First Nations Police
- Bear Island Police
- Neyaashiinigmiing Police; formerly Cape Croker Police
- Chippewas of the Thames First Nation Police
- Georgina Island Police
- Hiawatha First Nation Police
- K.I Police (Big Trout Lake)
- Kiashke Zaaging Anishinaabek Police (Gull Bay)
- Lake Helen Reserve Red Rock Band Police
- Mississauga First Nation Police
- Moravian Reserve Police
- Munsee-Delaware Police
- Oneida Police
- Pikangikum Police
- Tyendinaga Police
- Walpole Island First Nations Police

=== Quebec ===
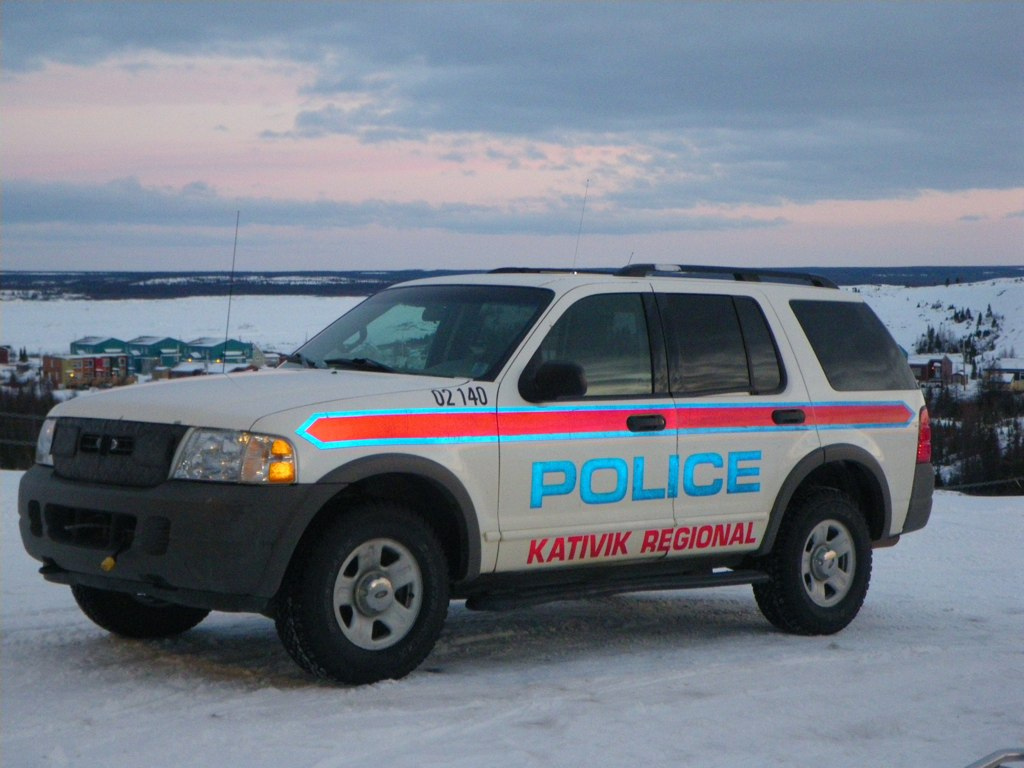
A Kativik Regional Police Force (now the Nunavik Police Service) scout car.

- Services de police Wôlinak et d’Odanak
- Services de police Timiskaming
- Kahnawake Peacekeepers
- Akwesasne Mohawk Police
- Services de police Naskapis
- Services de police Gesgapegiag
- Services de police Eagle Village
- Services de police Kitigan Zibi
- Service de police Kebaowek
- Services de police Listuguj
- Services de police Essipit
- Services de police Eeyou Eenou
- Service de police du Nunavik
- Sécurité publique d' Opitciwan
- Sécurité publique d' Uashat Mak Mani-Utenam
- Sécurité publique d' Pessamit
- Sécurité publique d' Wemotaci
- Sécurité publique d' Mashteuiatsh
- Sécurité publique d' Pakua Shipi
- Service de police de Manawan
- Service de police de Pikogan
- Service de police Lac-Simon

=== Saskatchewan ===
- File Hill First Nations Police Service

== Fictional ==
In various television and film media, producers may decide to utilise fictitious law enforcement agencies for the purpose of artistic license or copyright reasons.

=== Federal ===
- Immigration and Customs Security (Sécurité de l'immigration et des douanes) - the federal agency that is the main focus of the CBC television series The Border. Created to deal with trans-border matters including terrorism and smuggling, it operates under the supervision of Public Safety Canada. Throughout the series the agency liaises with both the Department of Homeland Security and MI6.
- Royal Canadian Federal Police, RCFP (Gendarmerie Royale Fédérale du Canada, GRFC) - national police service Sky Atlantic series Tin Star. Officers wear tan pants with a blue stripe, dark blue shirts with the service patch on either shoulder and black bulletproof vests with POLICE emblazoned on the front. It is a fictional version of the Royal Canadian Mounted Police.
- Canada Border Patrol, CBP (Patrouille Frontalière Canadienne, PFC) - national border services agency featured in the Sky Atlantic series Tin Star. It is a fictional version of, and has similar uniforms to the Canada Border Services Agency.
- Canadian Federal Police Corps (Corps de la police Fédérale Canadianne), CFPC - national police force in the CBC Series Allegiance (2024) is a fictional version of the RCMP.

=== Provincial ===
- Securité du Quebec - the provincial police service mentioned in the Radio-Canada and Bravo series 19-2. It is a fictional version of the Sûreté du Québec.
- Sûreté Nationale du Québec - the provincial police service in the 1996 Radio-Canada TV series Omerta. It is a fictional version of the Sûreté du Québec.

=== Local ===
- Algonquin Bay Police Department - police service in the CTV-Super Écran crime drama Cardinal, with jurisdiction in the fictional city of Algonquin Bay, Ontario.
- Little Big Bear Police Service - police service in the Sky Atlantic series Tin Star, covering the fictional town of Little Big Bear, Alberta.
- Metropolitan Law Enforcement - police service in the Global series Rookie Blue. The former is printed on the police force logo, however it is often referred to as the "Metropolitan Police" in show. The show is set in Toronto, but does not make overt references to the city until later seasons. The real life counterpart would be the Toronto Police Service.
- Metropolitan Police - police service in the CTV series Flashpoint and CBC Television series Cracked. A generic fictionalised version of the Toronto Police Service, it is home to the Strategic Response Unit (itself based on the Emergency Task Force (Toronto Police Service)).
- Regional Police - regional police service in the Showcase TV series Trailer Park Boys. The service is shown to have a Parking Enforcement Division additionally. It is a fictional/generic version of the Halifax Regional Police.
- Reverie Ipowahtaman Police Service - aboriginal police service in the Sky Atlantic series Tin Star. It covers the fictional Ipowahtaman First Nations reserve in Reverie, northern Alberta.
- St John's Police Department - police service in the CITY TV series Hudson and Rex. The actual St John's police department is the Royal Newfoundland Constabulary.
- Service de Police de Grande Ourse (Great Bear Police Service) - the local police service in the 2004 Radio-Canada TV series Grande Ourse. It covers the fictional mining town of Grande Ourse (Great Bear) in northern Quebec.
- Service de Police Métropolitain (Metropolitan Police Service) - police service used in the 1998 Radio-Canada TV series Caserne 24, the 2011 Radio-Canada and 2014 Bravo-CTV series 19-2. In Caserne 24 it is the generic police service for the unnamed city the show is set in. In both versions of 19-2 it is a fictitious, generic version of the Service de police de la Ville de Montréal, with the uniforms and police vehicles bearing strong resemblance to the real Montreal.
- Municipal Police Service - the police service covering Dog River, Saskatchewan, the fictional town in the CTV series Corner Gas. Generally just a two person police force, who do mostly Traffic Work. The Police Agency that would actually patrol the area would be the Royal Canadian Mounted Police .

== Defunct ==
=== Federal/Military ===
- Canada Customs and Revenue Agency
- Canadian Provost Corps
- Dominion Police
- Newfoundland Ranger Force
- North-West Mounted Police
- Royal Canadian Air Force Police

=== Provincial ===
- Alberta Provincial Police
- British Columbia Provincial Police
- Manitoba Provincial Police
- New Brunswick Provincial Police
- New Brunswick Highway Patrol
- Nova Scotia Police
- Prince Edward Island Provincial Police
- Saskatchewan Provincial Police

=== Regional/Municipal ===
- Rivière-du-Nord Municipal Police
- Shelburne Police Service

=== Special constabularies ===
- Hamilton Parks Police

== See also ==
- Canadian Association of Police Governance
- Crime in Canada
- Interpol
- Law enforcement by country
- Law enforcement in Canada
- List of countries by size of police forces
- Terrorism in Canada
- List of police firearms in Canada
