= Brockville Police Service =

Brockville Police Service Service de police de Brockville
- Motto: Partners for a safe & healthy community

Agency overview
- Formed: 1832

Jurisdictional structure
- Operations jurisdiction: Brockville, Ontario, Canada
- General nature: Local civilian police

Operational structure
- Headquarters: 2269 Parkedale Avenue, Brockville, Ontario 44.6070°N 75.6943°W
- Sworn members: 40 (2020)
- Unsworn members: 19
- Elected officer responsible: The Honourable Sylvia Jones, Solicitor General of Ontario
- Agency executive: Mark Noonan, chief of police

Website
- www.brockvillepolice.com

The Brockville Police Service (BPS; French: Service de police de Brockville) provides policing services for Brockville, the community of the Thousand Islands region on the St. Lawrence River in Eastern Ontario, Canada. Known as the "City of the 1000 Islands", Brockville (population 21,854 in 2016) is located directly opposite Morristown, New York on the north shore of the St. Lawrence River, about half-way between Cornwall in the east and Kingston in the west and a little over an hour from the nation's capital, Ottawa.

It is the oldest police service in the province of Ontario, having been formed in 1832.

Currently, the Brockville Police Service consists of over 100 members, including nine female officers and 19 civilian support members providing constant emergency response. The Brockville police have 22 vehicles, including two K9 patrols. In September 2013 the Brockville Police Service received 13 automated external defibrillators (AEDs) which were placed in each of the departments' marked patrol cruisers. This additional equipment allows the Brockville police officers to respond to sudden cardiac arrests (SCAs) and provide potentially life saving assistance. The chief of police is the highest-ranking officer of the Brockville service. The position currently belongs to Mark Noonan, who was appointed October 4, 2021.
