= Saskatchewan Provincial Police =

Defunct provincial police force in Saskatchewan

- Badge of the SPP
- Abbreviation: SPP

Agency overview
- Formed: 1917
- Dissolved: 1928

Jurisdictional structure
- Legal jurisdiction: Provincial

Operational structure
- Headquarters: Regina
- Sworn members: 175 (maximum strength)
- Agency executive: Charles Augustus Mahoney (1917-1928), Commissioner of Police

The Saskatchewan Provincial Police was the provincial police service of Saskatchewan, Canada, that existed from 1917 until 1928 under the Saskatchewan Provincial Police Act.

== History ==
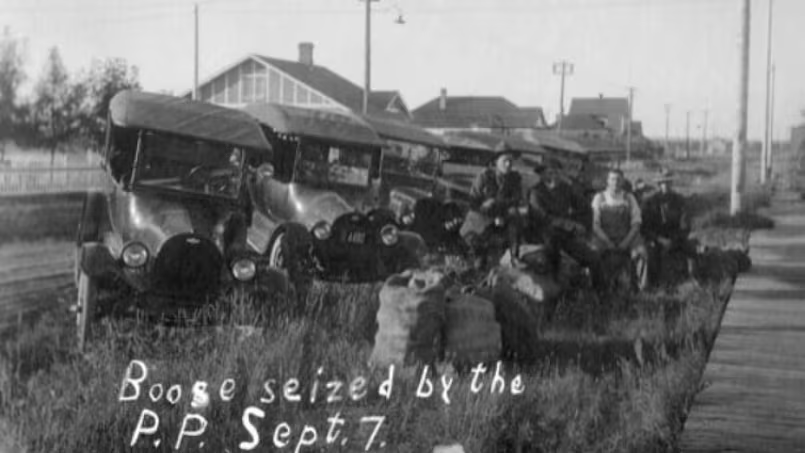
Saskatchewan Provinical Police carrying out prohibition work, c. 1920

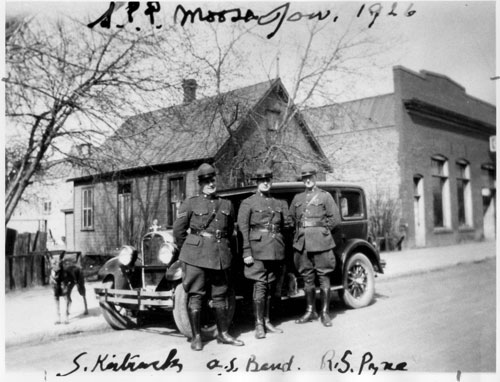
Saskatchewan Provincial Police in Moose Jaw, c. 1926

In 1906, under pressure from temperance organizations, the provincial government passed the Constables Act, allowing the province to create its own police force. In 1910, after the province passed the Labour Act and the Hotels Act the Royal Northwest Mounted Police (RNWMP) declined to enforce the terms of prohibition outlined in those laws over concerns that it would be prohibitively tedious to comply with differing liquor legislation in each of the provinces.

In 1911, Charles Augustus Mahoney (1869–1941), a veteran Ontario Provincial Police officer, was appointed Chief Constable of the Saskatchewan Secret Service. The name of this force comes from the fact that its members did not wear uniforms in order to covertly enforce prohibition-era legislation and end illegal liquor trafficking. This force was limited solely to enforcing the Labour Act and the Hotels Act, while the RNWMP continued to enforce all other police functions.

By 1916, the RNWMP was strained by its involvement during the First World War at the homefront with border patrols, enemy surveillance, and national security enforcement. Recognizing the need for a fully fledged police force, Mahoney was charged with creating the SPP, using his Secret Service as a model. Mahoney recruited aggressively, attracting recruits from the RNWMP, the United Kingdom and municipal police services from Halifax to Vancouver.

On 1 January 1917, the Saskatchewan Provincial Police came into being and took over provincial policing needs while national policing in Saskatchewan continued to be conducted by the RNWMP.

The SPP was granted a number of responsibilities enforcing criminal law as well as provincial laws including the Game Act, Prairie and Forest Fires Act, School Attendance Act, Vehicles Act, Theatres and Cinematographs Act. They also continued the Secret Service's temperance work, for which they are most remembered with resentment.

By 1928, mounting operational costs led the province to abandon the SPP and contracted the Royal Canadian Mounted Police to resume its service as Saskatchewan's provincial police service. From an economic point of view, the decision was clear; the SPP cost the provincial government $500,000 per year; the RCMP could provide the same service for only $200,000. Today, "F" Division is the RCMP's unit responsible for Saskatchewan.

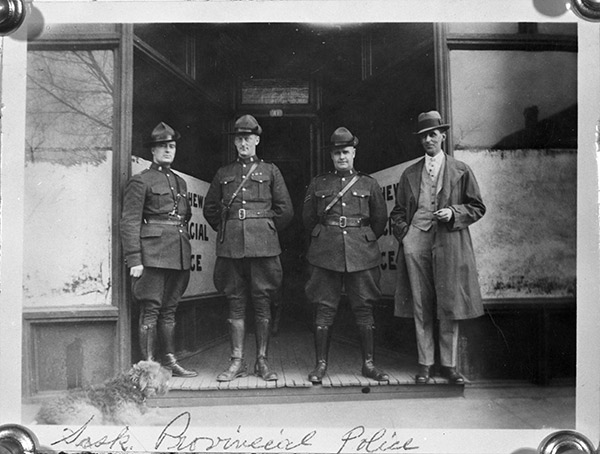
Three officers of the Saskatchewan Provincial Police, and a man in an overcoat and fedora, who is possibly a police detective. C. 1920

=== Successor ===
In March 2025, the Saskatchewan Marshals Service (SMS) launched its operations. As a provincial police service, it is effectively the SPP's successor, though its enforcement activities are more limited: The SMS reportedly focuses on serious crime, such as drug and gang activity.

== Organization and personnel ==
The SPP was led by a commissioner of police. The force's rank and file consisted of a mix of former RNWMP officers, military personnel and others with no policing experience.

Other ranks in the force were:

- Assistant commissioner
- Inspector
- Non-commissioned officers
- Sworn non-commissioned members
  - Sergeant
  - Constable

The force had 79 detachments across the province, and a maximum strength ranging from 145 to 175 officers in the 1920s. The SPP was initially divided into four regions with headquarters in Regina, Weyburn, Saskatoon and Prince Albert. A fifth region was later added when Swift Current contracted the SPP for municipal law enforcement. Prince Albert was home to the most impressive of the SPP regional headquarters, being in a building that once housed the Prince Albert Men's Club. Most detachments were stationed in shacks or even rented rooms in private dwellings.

Officers of the SPP were armed with Smith & Wesson .38 Hand Ejector Specials, Peerless handcuffs and night sticks. Two Thompson submachine guns were also purchased and stored in the Regina headquarters for use in emergencies.

The uniform worn by SPP officers was very distinctive, featuring an upturned Stetson, making them resemble Australian slouch hats.

Officers of the SPP travelled the province via a wide variety of methods including horseback, automobiles, early motorcycles and, in the winter dogsleds.

== Major incidents ==
=== Steep Creek murders ===
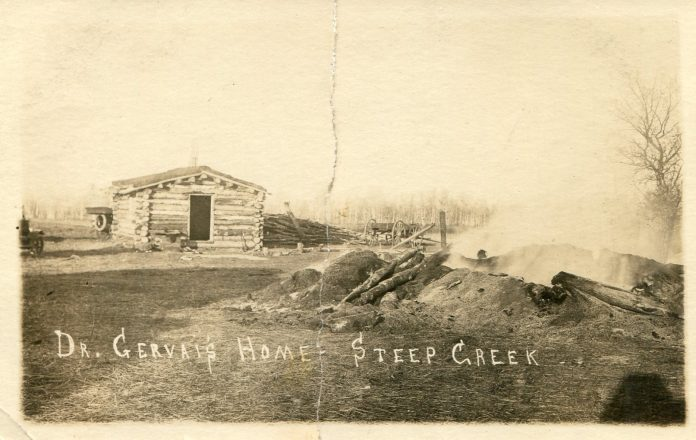
The home of Dr. Gervais, site of the Steep Creek murders

In November 1918 when a bailiff—James McKay—travelled to the farm of Dr. Joseph Gervais to collect a court-ordered payment. The bailiff was killed by two of Gervais's boarders, Jean Baptiste St. Germain and Victor Carmel. All three had come from Quebec, the latter two as refugees from conscription. Gervais himself is believed to have helped in concealing the murder.

The SPP investigated the crime and Gervais was soon arrested, but Carmel and St. Germain escaped and went on the run. During the attempts to apprehend the suspects, a police officer was killed when he opened the door to a dugout the two were hiding in. Both men were caught when they went to an area farm looking for food.

The murder of a soldier—Adolphe Lajoie—came to light later with both Carmel and Gervais confessing to the deed. The circumstances of this murder remain unclear.

All three were arrested, tried, convicted and hanged at the provincial gaol. It is believed that this execution was the only hanging in Canada where three convicts were simultaneously put to death. The three traps on which the men stood were connected to each other, so all three men dropped at the same time.

=== Tisdale shootout ===
On 17 September 1920, a group of lumbermen were playing poker in Barrows Junction, Manitoba. While they were dealing the cards, four men, believed to be Americans, burst into the building and robbed the lumbermen.

The Manitoba Provincial Police, realizing the suspects had crossed into Saskatchewan by following the Canadian Northern Railway tracks, alerted the SPP.

Two railwaymen met the thieves along the tracks and gunfire was exchanged, driving the suspects into the bush.

SPP Constable Ives arrested two of the suspects, Wasyl Braschuk and John Fashchowy, in the nearby hamlet of Peesane and were sentenced to seven years in prison for attempted murder of Ives and carrying offensive weapons. The other two suspects remained at large.

On 21 September, a railway man identified tracks leading into a disturbed haystack 5 km east of Tisdale. The SPP surrounded the 15-tonne pile of hay and ordered the suspects to surrender. After a lengthy shootout, Inspector R. R. Tait ordered the haystack to be set on fire. Once the fire was extinguished, the burnt bodies of Jerry Smule and "Tony" Kozal were extracted from the ashes.

== See also ==
- Alberta Provincial Police
- British Columbia Provincial Police
- Nova Scotia Police
