= Saskatchewan Marshals Service =

Saskatchewan provincial law enforcement agency

Agency overview
- Formed: March 2025
- Preceding agency: Saskatchewan Provincial Police
- Annual budget: $20 million (planned)

Jurisdictional structure
- Operations jurisdiction: Saskatchewan

Operational structure
- Headquarters: Prince Albert, Saskatchewan
- Sworn members: 17
- Elected officer responsible: Tim McLeod, Minister of Corrections, Policing and Public Safety
- Agency executive: Rob Cameron, Chief Marshal

Website
- Official website

The Saskatchewan Marshals Service (SMS) is a provincial police service with jurisdiction in the province of Saskatchewan. The SMS will reportedly focus its enforcement efforts on serious crime, such as drug and gang activity, while providing assistance to other police forces in Saskatchewan, including the RCMP. Another area the SMS will focus on is agricultural crimes such as cattle theft and trespassing.

Current plans suggest that it will be fully operational by late 2025, despite previous expectations being that it would not launch until 2026.

SMS officers are known as Marshals.

== History ==
On November 3, 2022, it was announced through a throne speech that the Saskatchewan Marshals Service will be established. By November 7, 2023, the Government of Saskatchewan announced new legislation would be passed in order to serve as the legal foundation for the existence of the SMS. The Police (Miscellaneous) Amendment Act, 2023, which amends The Police Act, 1990, specifically mentioned the SMS as a police service. The act received royal assent on March 19, 2024. In response to plans to create the SMS, then-Sakatchewan RCMP Assistant Commissioner Rhonda Blackmore said that the funds being allocated could be used to fund F Division's operations.

On November 29, 2023, it was announced that Rob Cameron would head the SMS as its chief marshal. At the time of his appointment, Cameron was a deputy assistant minister of the Ministry of Corrections, Policing and Public Safety (MCPPS). The ministry said it had received 12 applicants from across Canada for the position. On June 21, 2024, the SMS recruited Richard Lowen, formerly with the Winnipeg and Estevan Police Services, as the service's Deputy Chief Marshal. The service's insignia was also unveiled.

In March 2025, it was announced that the service's first regional headquarters will be established in the North Battleford region, led by Inspector Tim Garland. The headquarters will open in the fall of 2025 and serve as a base to eleven sworn officers, in addition to civilian support staff. It was also reported in the same month that the SMS will start working alongside the Weyburn Police Service.

On May 30, 2025, the SMS reported that Phase 2 of its integration and operations process by working alongside officers of the Prince Albert Police Service (PAPS). The SMS reported that they will work with the PAPS in certain cases where sustained attention is required. Inspector Garland mentioned the importance of getting the public to know more about the SMS and the work that they'll do once they become fully operational. In June 2025, SMS Marshals were deployed in Saskatchewan in the midst of the 2025 Canadian wildfires to ensure evacuated towns were not targeted by looters.

In the Saskatchewan provincial budget for 2025-2026, the 2025-26 Budget report stated that around CAD$4 million will be allocated to hire 50 more marshals for the SMS. Under Protection of Persons and Property, CAD$4 million was allocated to support implementation of the service.

On February 12, 2026, the SMS has reportedly made plans to expand the service by recruiting more Marshals from experienced officers from other police forces or fresh recruits. 13 Marshals are at the SMS' Prince Albert headquarters with four stationed at the North Battleford satellite office.

=== Recruitment ===
The SMS' first officers were recruited in March 2025 and started their jobs the following May.

From June 2025, the Marshals Service recruited individuals without prior policing experience, as well as experienced officers. New recruits were required to fulfil several entry requirements, such as being either a citizen or permanent resident of Canada, completion of a physical test, and completion of at least a Grade 12 education. New recruits will undergo basic training and field training with a total duration of 25 weeks. The entry-level salary for a recruit with no prior policing experience is roughly $96,000.

Experienced officers are allowed to complete a fast-track programme, provided that they graduated from a police training programme that is recognized by the Saskatchewan Police Commission, and that they were employed as a police officer within the last three years. For experienced officers, the training programme takes seven weeks to complete and consists of in-service training, mandatory qualifications, as well as online coursework. The training focuses on firearms, tactical emergency casualty care, high risk vehicle stops and education on Indigenous culture.

50 officers were reportedly recruited at the end of 2025. It was reported that the SMS would have 70 active duty officers by 2026. In June 2026, it was reported that 27 officers are in the SMS.

== Organization ==
The SMS is based at Prince Albert.

=== Leadership ===
The minister in charge of the MCPPS is responsible for appointing the SMS Chief Marshal.

=== Oversight ===
The SMS is held accountable for potential wrongdoings through the following:

1. Government of Saskatchewan through The Saskatchewan Police Act.
2. The Minister’s SMS Advisory Council
3. Public Complaints Commission
4. Saskatchewan Police Commission
5. Saskatchewan Serious Incident Response Team (SIRT)

=== Ranks ===
The following ranks are used in the SMS:

- Chief Marshal
- Deputy Chief Marshal
- Superintendent
- Inspector
- Marshal

== Controversies ==
In August 2024, the National Police Federation launched a call to action urging the Government of Saskatchewan to pause funding for the Marshals Service. They claimed that the creation of the new agency would cost $14 million in start-up costs and that the government had failed to engage with its constituents before deciding to go ahead with the creation. Going forward, the National Police Federation estimates that the annual operation costs of the Marshals Service will be approximately $20 million. In November 2023, Saskatchewan rural councillors voted against a motion that called for the Saskatchewan provincial government to halt the creation of the SMS.

During the 2024 Saskatchewan general election campaign, Saskatchewan New Democratic Party leader Carla Beck promised to redirect funds from the newly created Marshals Service, instead using the money to hire 100 RCMP members and 100 municipal police officers. The NDP claimed that the government had spent more than $40,000 for less than 100 campaign hats, meaning that the cost per hat was $587. In March 2025, the Saskatchewan New Democratic Party's house leader Nicole Sarauer expressed concern that new Marshals Service recruits had been "poached" from the RCMP and other municipal police forces. However, none of the service's first ten sworn officers had previously served with the RCMP. To date, the SMS has only recruited one ex-RCMP member from British Columbia, who is expected to start in the fall of 2025.

In April 2025, before the service began its operations, an officer of the Marshals Service was put on administrative leave pending an investigation by the Public Complaints Commission. It was reported that no further details on the complaint would be released while the investigation is still ongoing. In July 2025, it was reported that the officer is no longer in the SMS. While conclusions of the investigation were not made public, it is known that the officer resigned. On April 16, 2026, details on the investigation were not disclosed despite recommendations from the Saskatchewan Information and Privacy Commissioner to have the information released for public interest reasons.

== See also ==
- Saskatchewan Provincial Police - Predecessor
