= Saugeen Shores Police Service =

Municipal police service in Ontario, Canada

The Saugeen Shores Police Service is a municipal police service in Ontario, Canada, providing service for Port Elgin, Southampton and Saugeen Township.

== History ==
The Saugeen Shores Police Service was brought into existence with the amalgamation of the Port Elgin Police Service and Southampton Police Service in 1995 to form the Southampton-Port Elgin Police Service. The police service started to police the Saugeen Township under contract. When the three towns amalgamated, it became the service in which it is today.

== Service profile ==
The Saugeen Shores Police Service consists of a Chief of Police, an Inspector, 5 Sergeants, 2 Detective Constables, 16 Constables, 2 Special Constables, 6 Auxiliary Constables, and 3 full-time Civilian Support members.
