= New Brunswick Highway Patrol =

Canadian provincial police (1978–1989)

The New Brunswick Highway Patrol or NBHP was a police force active in New Brunswick, Canada between 1978 and 1989.

== History ==
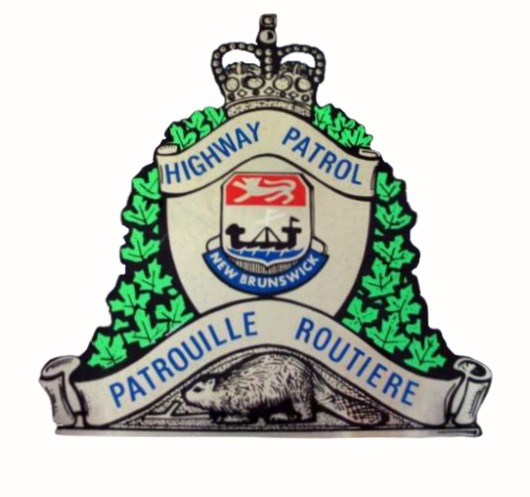
Badge of the New Brunswick Highway Patrol

In 1978 the government of Premier Richard Hatfield transferred 25 commercial vehicle enforcement officers from the Highway Law Enforcement Division of the provincial Department of Transportation to the provincial Department of Justice. The duties of these officers initially consisted of traffic patrol, commercial vehicle enforcement, enforcement of highway laws such as the Highway Act, Motor Carrier Act and Motor Vehicle Act, seizure of motor vehicle license plates, and escort for oversize loads. These duties were initially carried out between Monday and Friday during daylight hours.

In January 1980 the Highway Law Enforcement Division was renamed the New Brunswick Highway Patrol and the focus changed to policing. Expansion during the early 1980s saw the NBHP expand its coverage to all highways in New Brunswick. Training requirements mandated a law enforcement background and members of the NBHP were peace officers with the same training and responsibilities as other police forces in the province under the Police Act.

The NBHP expanded to 114 uniformed officers commanded by a chief and deputy chief and supported by civilian staff at the detachments. NBHP divided the province into two regions with a staff sergeant being responsible for each region. Each detachment was commanded by a sergeant and patrol officers had the rank of constable. There was no rank of corporal.

In July 1988 the recently elected government of Premier Frank McKenna announced that the responsibilities of the NBHP would be contracted to the Royal Canadian Mounted Police "J" Division. The NBHP was abolished effective February 1, 1989.

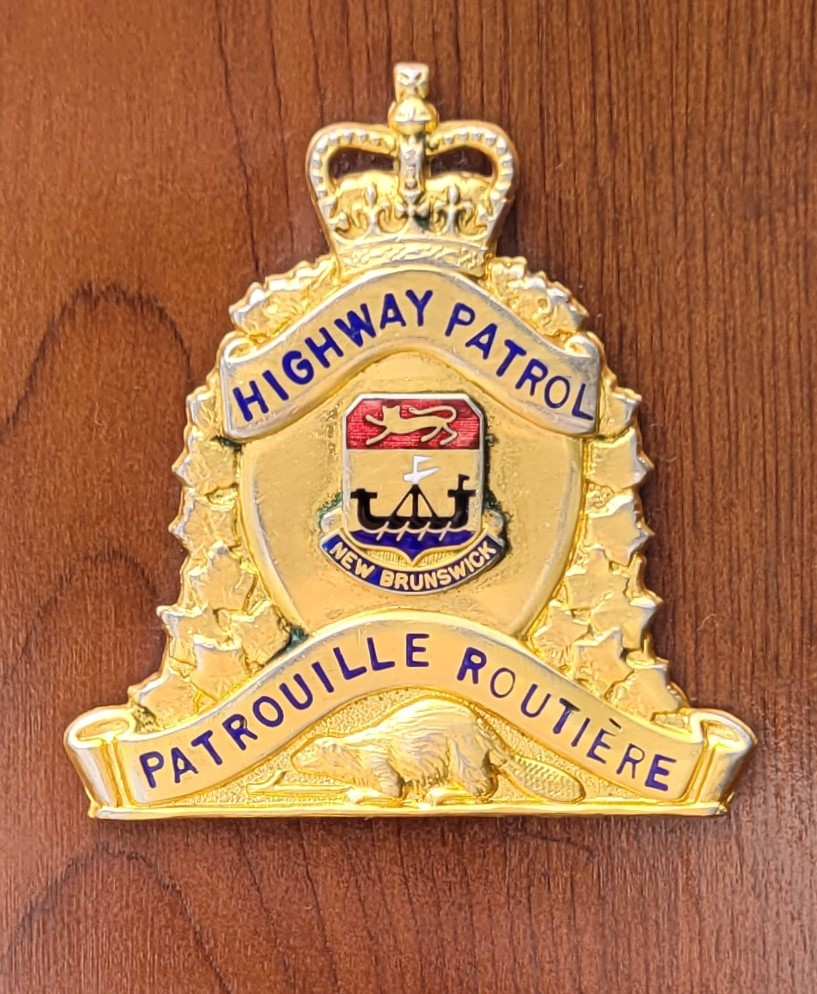
The cap badge of the NBHP, typically worn on the forage cap.

=== Murder of Constable Emmanuel Aucoin ===
The only NBHP officer killed while on duty was Const. Emmanuel Aucoin who was shot March 8, 1987 on the side of the Hanwell Rd (Route 640) by American felon Anthony Romeo.

Cst. Aucoin had stopped a rented Porsche with United States license plates being driven by Romeo on a remote stretch of Route 640 between the communities of Yoho and Hanwell. Romeo was in Canada trying to evade law enforcement authorities in the United States where a warrant for his arrest had been issued in New York. Cst. Aucoin was shot twice in the head by Romeo while in the process of writing the speeding ticket.

Romeo was in possession of several weapons while in Canada, including an antique rifle and a crossbow. At his murder trial, the court records show that Romeo discarded his weapons into the nearby woods and then fled across the border to the United States, crossing at the Vanceboro port of entry. His rented Porsche was found at Bangor International Airport and Romeo was arrested by police at Logan International Airport in Boston where he was attempting to board a flight to Florida. Romeo was returned to Canada for trial and was found guilty of first degree murder. His sentence was life in prison with no chance of parole for 25 years. The verdict was upheld following an appeal and retrial. Romeo was denied parole in 2012, and was again denied parole on February 2, 2022, as the Canadian Parole Board felt Romeo still posed an undue risk to society if released.
