= Cornwall Police Service =

Police service in Ontario Canada

Cornwall Police Service Service Communautaire de la Police de Cornwall
- The badge worn by Cornwall police officers.
- Abbreviation: CPS

Agency overview
- Formed: 1860
- Annual budget: $21,800,591CAD

Jurisdictional structure
- Operations jurisdiction: Municipality of the City of Cornwall
- Area: 62 square kilometres (24 sq mi)
- Population: 47,845 (2021 Census)
- Legal jurisdiction: Municipal
- Governing body: Cornwall Police Service Board
- General nature: Local civilian police

Operational structure
- Headquarters: 340 Pitt St.
- Sworn Officers: 93 Police officers 12 Special constables
- Civilian Employees: 37 Civilian employees 13 Part-time staff
- Elected officers responsible: Michael Kerzner, Minister of the Solicitor General; Shawna Spowart, Chief of Police

Facilities
- Stations: 2 (Including headquarters)

The Cornwall Police Service (CPS) is the municipal police service of Cornwall, Ontario, Canada. Although it was not officially founded as the city's police service until 1957, an established law enforcement agency has been present in Cornwall since 1860, making it one of the oldest police services in the province of Ontario. Today the CPS is constituted of over 150 members operating on approximately 62 square kilometers and serving 47,845 people.

== Divisions ==
Cornwall Police Service HQ on Pitt Street

=== Patrol Division ===
- Patrol Unit
- Cornwall Emergency Response Team (C.E.R.T.)
- Bicycle and Foot Patrol

=== Investigative Services Division ===
- Criminal Investigations Unit
- Forensic Identification Unit
- Sexual Assault and Child Abuse Unit
- Street Crime Unit (Drug trafficking)

=== Operational Support Division ===
- Crime Reduction and Community Partnership Unit
- Marine Unit
- Community Operations
- Youth Services Unit
- Victims Services Unit
- Vulnerable Sector Mobile Acute Response Team (VSAMRT)
- Accredited Facility Dog (Mental Health Companion)

=== Administrative Support Division ===
- Communication Unit
- Court Bureau

== Fleet ==
As with most police services throughout Canada, the Cornwall police service relies primarily on Ford Interceptors Utility for patrolling duties.

In addition to Ford Interceptors, the CPS, along with many other police services uses modified Dodge Chargers for patrol.

In early 2022 the CPS acquired 3 hybrid Ford interceptors as a trial to incorporating HEVs to their fleet. The justifications brought forward by the officer in charge included rising fuel costs, and long idling times while on duty.

On September 1, 2022 the CPS purchased a new Armored Rescue Vehicle (ARV) designed for emergency responses to dangerous situations. The ARV purchased by the CPS is a demo model manufactured by Zodiac Engineering. This vehicle was purchased for $95,000CAD using funds from the 2022 CPS fleet budget which was not entirely used due to supply chain issues.

The CPS historically used Crown Victoria Police Interceptors as their primary patrol vehicle however, with official production ending in 2011 most police services including the CPS have transitioned to newer and more advanced police vehicles. It is currently unclear, but unlikely that the Cornwall police service still uses these vehicles.

== Former chiefs ==
- 1882–1902: Allan Cameron (First Chief)
- 1902–1919: Robert Smyth
- 1919–1920: John Fyvie
- 1920–1921: W.H. Howard
- 1921–1924: John Paterson
- 1924–1925: Joseph E. Phillion
- 1925–1943: Fred Seymour
- 1943–1953: Frank Hunter
- 1953–1974: Allan Clarke
- 1974–1984: Earl Landry
- 1984–1994: Claude Shaver
- 1994–1995: Carl Johnston
- 1995–2003: Anthony Repa
- 2004–2018: Daniel Parkinson
- 2018–2021: Danny Aikman
- 2021–Present: Shawna Spowart (Current Chief)

== Ranks and insignia ==
The rank insignia worn by the Cornwall Police is similar to the one used in other police services throughout Canada.

Rank	Commanding officers		Senior officers		Police officers					
Rank	Chief of police	Deputy chief of police	Superintendent	Inspector	Staff sergeant	Sergeant	First class constable	Second class constable	Third class constable	Fourth class constable
Insignia (slip-on)										
Insignia (shoulder board)					Shoulder boards not used for these ranks					
