= Parks Canada Warden Service =

- Abbreviation: PCWS

Agency overview
- Formed: 1908 (warden service formation; agency predecessor 1911)

Jurisdictional structure
- Operations jurisdiction: Parks Canada Agency, Canada
- Legal jurisdiction: Federal lands administered by Parks Canada

Operational structure
- Headquarters: 30 Victoria Street, Gatineau, Quebec J8X 0B3, Canada
- Agency executive: Chief Executive Officer, Parks Canada

Website
- https://parks.canada.ca

The Parks Canada Warden Service (commonly Park Wardens) are federal peace officers who protect natural and cultural resources, provide visitor safety, and enforce the Canada National Parks Act and associated regulations on lands administered by the Parks Canada Agency. The modern Law Enforcement Branch and warden law-enforcement specialization were formalized in the 2000s after health and safety audits recommended sidearm carriage for officer safety. Parks Canada publishes national guidance, incident reporting lines, and park-level law enforcement summaries.

== Park-by-park (selected units) ==
Below are park-level summaries with founding/establishment dates, typical warden responsibilities for the unit, typical field/enforcement vehicles and equipment used by wardens in that unit.

=== Banff National Park ===
- Established: 1885 (Rocky Mountains Park; Canada’s first national park).
- Warden role locally: Banff has one of the oldest warden presences (original fire & game wardens in the early 1900s). Wardens perform backcountry patrols, visitor compliance, wildlife conflict response, SAR coordination and evidence collection for park offences.
- Vehicles & field kit: 4×4 marked park warden SUVs/trucks, ATVs/snowmobiles, small boats; Banff also hosts Parks Canada’s last dedicated K-9 SAR handler.

=== Jasper National Park ===
- Established: 1907 as Jasper Forest Park (national park since 1930).
- Warden role locally: Large, remote mountain park. Wardens focus on visitor safety (including post-wildfire access), wildlife protection, investigative enforcement; Jasper’s reporting shows regular enforcement statistics.
- Vehicles & field kit: 4×4 SUVs and trucks, boats for lakes, snowmobiles and tracked vehicles for alpine/winter areas.

=== Waterton Lakes National Park ===
- Established: 1895 (later part of the International Peace Park with Glacier NP, USA).
- Warden role locally: Wardens patrol for wildlife interactions, enforce closures, and coordinate with RCMP for policing. Reporting contacts are on the park’s official pages.
- Vehicles & field kit: Road vehicles, boats on Waterton Lake, ATVs/snowmobiles; historic warden cabins are still visible.

=== Pacific Rim National Park Reserve ===
- Established: 1970; became a park reserve under the 2000 Act.
- Warden role locally: Coastal/marine enforcement (permits on West Coast Trail & Broken Group), public safety (drownings, tides), and marine patrols with DFO cooperation.
- Vehicles & field kit: SUVs, rigid-hull inflatables, sea kayaks, radios/satellite comms.

=== Gwaii Haanas National Park Reserve and Haida Heritage Site ===
- Established: Protected by Haida in 1985; South Moresby Agreement 1988; Gwaii Haanas Agreement (co-management) 1993.
- Warden/watchmen role locally: Co-management with the Haida Nation’s Watchmen; Parks Canada wardens handle enforcement, marine patrols, and orientation.
- Vehicles & field kit: Transport by skiff/boat and floatplane; radios and satellite comms.

=== Gros Morne National Park ===
- Established: 1973 (Newfoundland & Labrador).
- Warden role locally: Patrol alpine & fjord landscapes, coordinate SAR, protect geology and culture, enforce regulations.
- Vehicles & field kit: 4×4 trucks/SUVs, ATVs, boats.

=== Fundy National Park ===
- Established: 1948 (New Brunswick).
- Warden role locally: High-tide coastal safety, trail safety, wildlife/resource protection, visitor education.
- Vehicles & field kit: Marked trucks/SUVs, small boats, seasonal ATV/snowmobile.

=== Cape Breton Highlands National Park ===
- Established: 1936.
- Warden role locally: Patrol Cabot Trail, manage visitor incidents/wildlife encounters, enforce regulations.
- Vehicles & field kit: SUVs, ATVs, small tracked vehicles, comms gear.
