= Law enforcement in Canada =

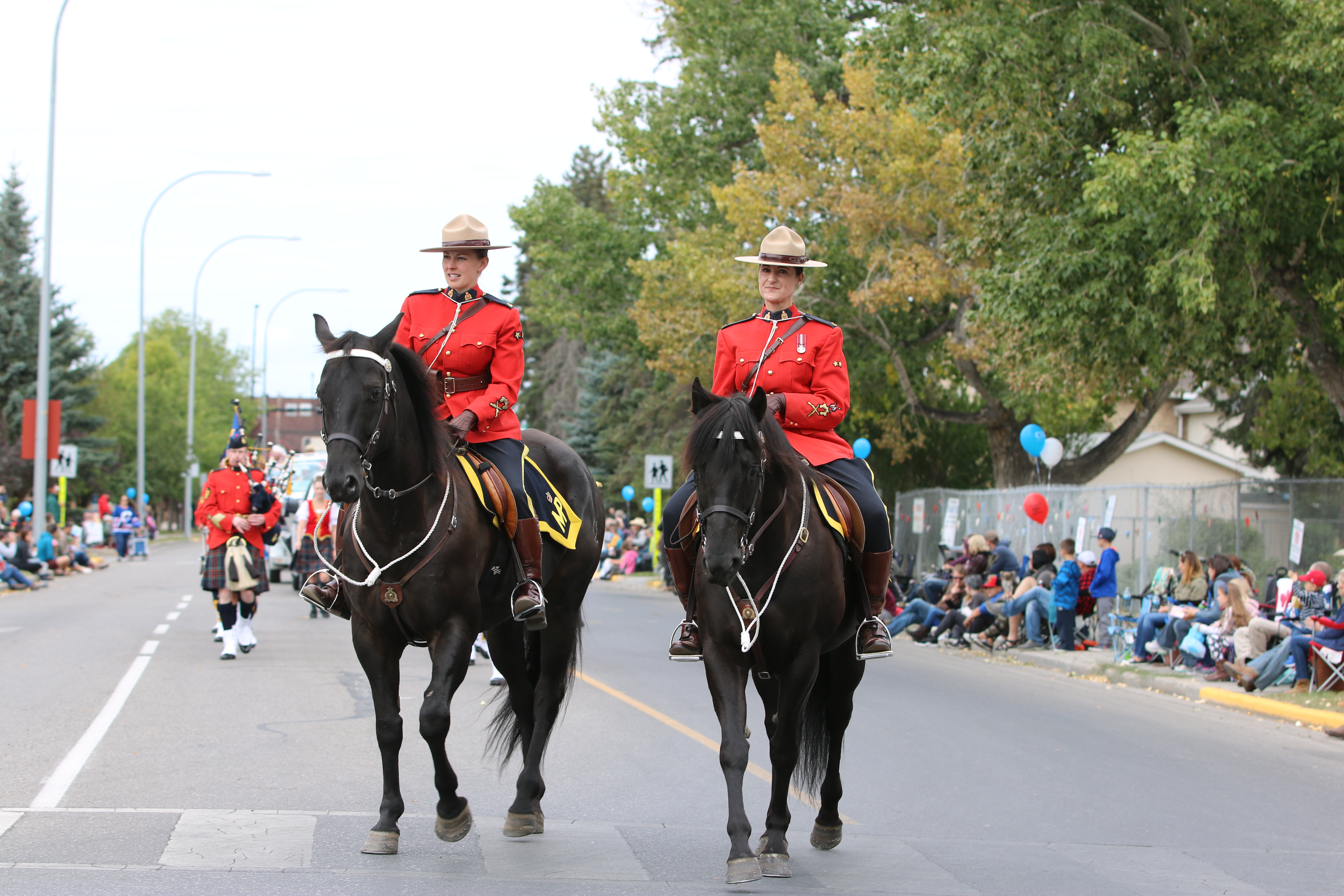
RCMP officers participate in the Musical Ride.

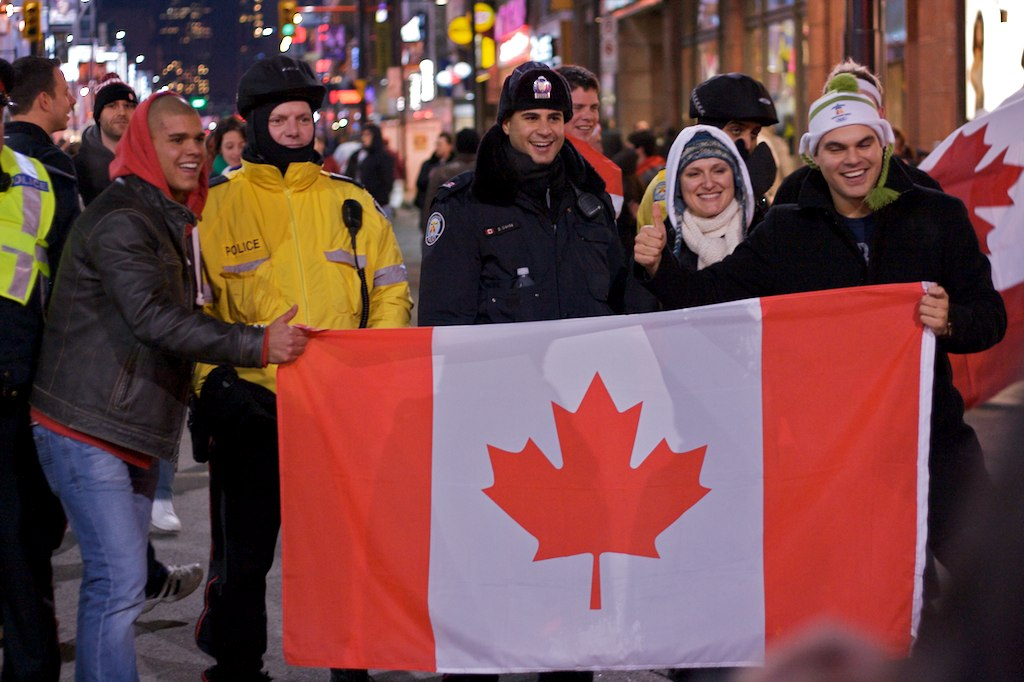
Toronto Police Service officers and hockey fans pose with the Canadian flag.

Law enforcement in Canada is the responsibility of police services, special constabularies, and civil law enforcement agencies, which are operated by every level of government, some private and Crown corporations, and First Nations. With the exception of the Unité permanente anticorruption (Permanent Anti-corruption Unit) in Quebec and the Organized Crime Agency of British Columbia, there are no organizations dedicated exclusively to the investigation of criminal activity in Canada. Criminal investigations are conducted by jurisdictional police services, which maintain specialized criminal investigation units in addition to their mandate for emergency response and general community safety.

Canadian provinces are responsible for the development and maintenance of police forces and special constabularies, and every province except Newfoundland and Labrador delegates this responsibility to municipalities, which can establish their own police forces or contract with a neighbouring community or the province for police services. The federal government maintains its own police force, the Royal Canadian Mounted Police (RCMP, popularly known in English-speaking areas as the "Mounties"), which provides federal criminal law enforcement and contract police services to provinces and municipalities that do not maintain their own dedicated police forces. Civil law enforcement, however, is the responsibility of the level or agency of government that developed those laws — the by-laws of a transit authority, for example, are enforced by that transit authority, while federal environmental regulations are enforced by the federal government.

Since the 1990s, a framework has existed for First Nations to establish their own police services, funded entirely by the federal and provincial governments and regulated by provinces. These police services generally receive less funding compared to other Canadian police forces — for example, in 2016, the Nishnawbe-Aski Police Service in Ontario received only 36% of the funding that the Ontario Provincial Police estimated it would cost to police the same area.

== Police services ==
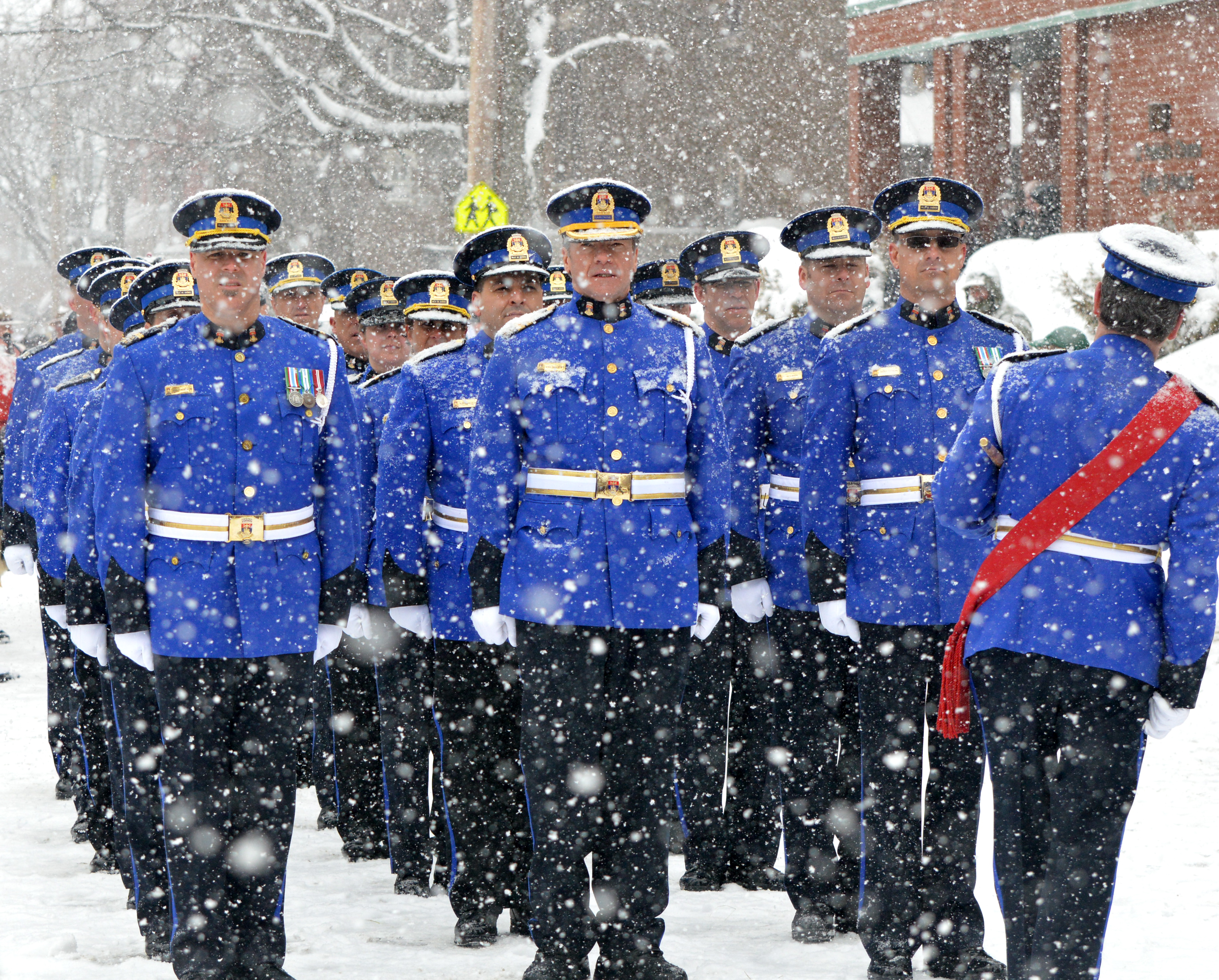
Quebec City police officers preparing for the city's Saint Patrick's Day parade in 2014

Police services in Canada are responsible for the maintenance of the King's peace through emergency response to and intervention against violence; investigations into criminal offences and the enforcement of criminal law; and the enforcement of some civil law, such as traffic violations. Constitutionally, the delivery of police services is the responsibility of provinces and territories, but every province except for Newfoundland and Labrador, which maintains the Royal Newfoundland Constabulary to police some of its urban communities, delegates this responsibility to municipalities. The federal government also maintains its own police service, the Royal Canadian Mounted Police, which provinces and territories can contract to provide provincial and municipal policing. Every Canadian territory and province, with the exceptions of Ontario and Quebec, relies on the RCMP to provide at least some provincial or municipal police services.

The exact duties of Canadian police forces vary significantly: each province regulates the basic responsibilities of police services in their jurisdiction. In Ontario, for example, police services are obliged to provide at least five core police services — crime prevention, law enforcement, maintenance of the public peace, emergency response, and assistance to victims of crime — to fulfill the province's requirement for "adequate and effective policing," while in neighbouring Quebec, the responsibilities of a police force are dependent on the population it serves. Other jurisdictions, such as Manitoba and British Columbia, do not define adequate and effective policing, although individual regulations in both of those provinces set out basic responsibilities of police forces. Individual police services may also take on additional duties, such as municipal by-law enforcement, or have a narrower mandate (but not fewer powers) in communities that maintain independent traffic enforcement or mental health crisis response agencies.

=== Federal ===
The federal government maintains two police forces: the Royal Canadian Mounted Police (RCMP) and the Canadian Forces Military Police (CFMP).

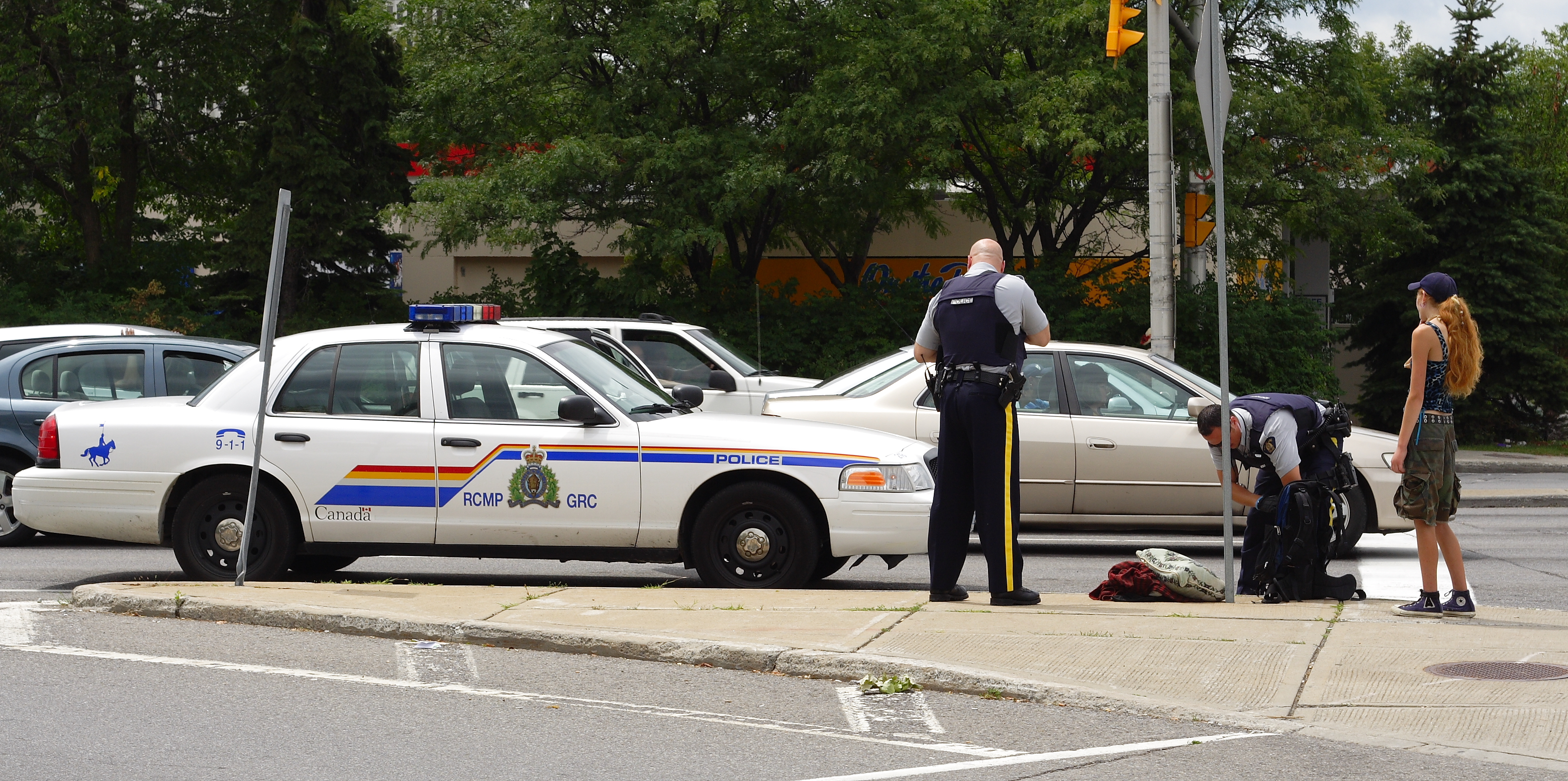
RCMP officers conducting a search

The RCMP's first responsibility is the enforcement of federal laws, although contract policing for provinces, territories, municipalities, and First Nations is at the "heart of what the RCMP does." In addition to its contracts with three territories, eight provinces, 150 municipalities, and more than 600 Indigenous communities, the RCMP is responsible for border integrity; overseeing Canadian peacekeeping missions involving police; managing the Canadian Firearms Program, which licenses and registers firearms and their owners; and the Canadian Police College, which provides police training to Canadian and international police forces. The force has faced criticism for its uniquely broad mandate, and a partially redacted 2019 memo to then-Minister of Public Safety Bill Blair "confirmed" for the Minister that "federal policing responsibilities have been and are being eroded to meet contract demands." Between 2012 and 2020, the RCMP gradually closed its money laundering and financial crimes units in British Columbia and Ontario, and in 2019, there were no RCMP officers in B.C. dedicated to investigating money laundering. In 2021, an all-party federal parliamentary committee recommended terminating the RCMP's contract policing program, and Public Safety Minister Marco Mendicino was mandated to conduct a review of RCMP contract policing when he took office in 2022.

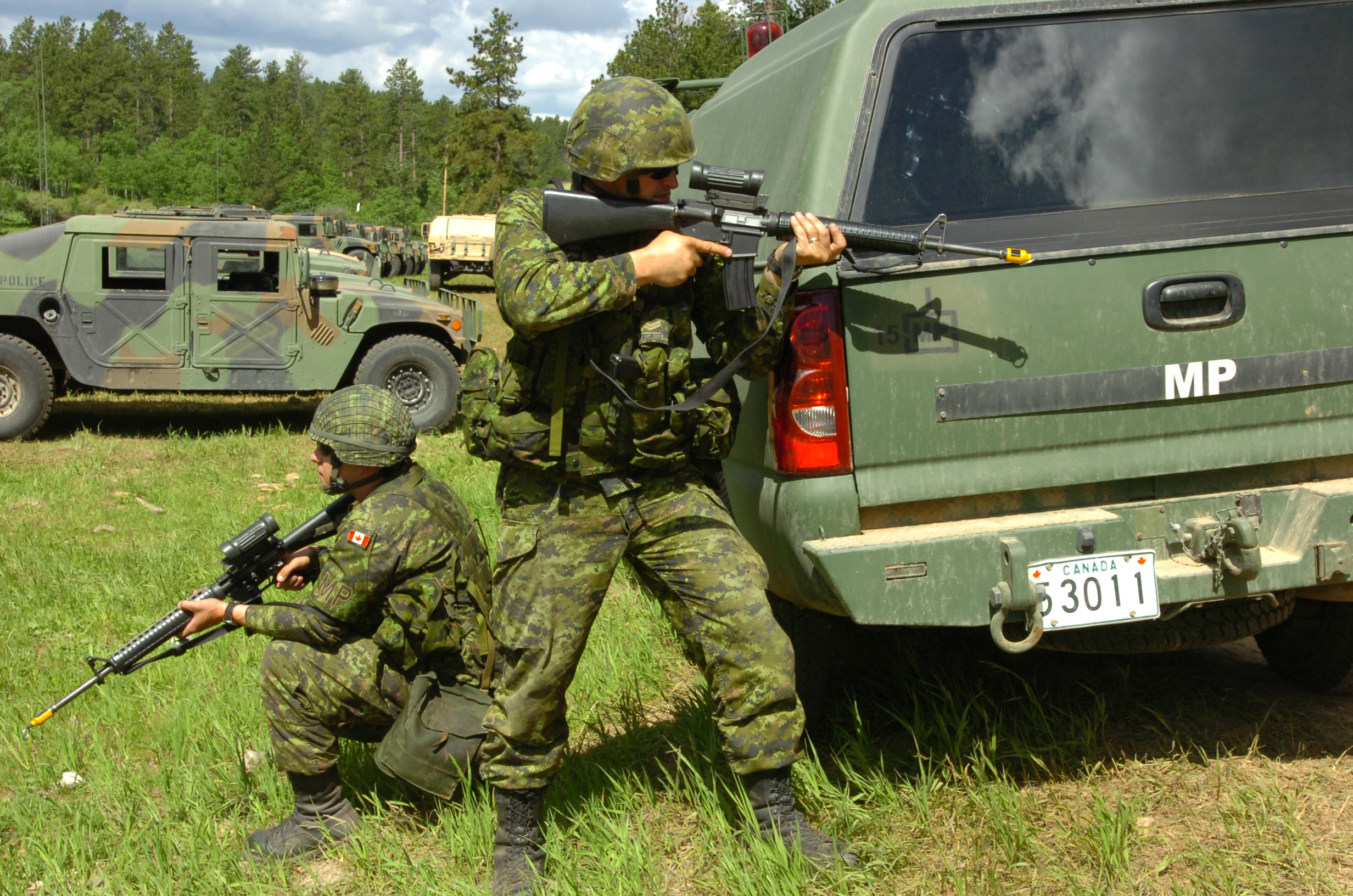
Canadian Forces Military Police members taking part in a training exercise in South Dakota alongside their US counterparts.

The CFMP provides police, security, and operational support services to the Canadian Armed Forces (CAF) and the Department of National Defence (DND). As a military police force, the CFMP does not have a frontline community policing role, but CFMP members are considered peace officers under the Criminal Code. CFMP officers have authority over any person subject to the Code of Service Discipline (CSD), regardless of their position or rank, and can charge members of the broader public when a crime is committed on or in relation to DND property or assets, or at the request of the Minister of Public Safety, the Commissioner of the Correctional Service of Canada, or the Commissioner of the Royal Canadian Mounted Police. The ability of CFMP members to enforce provincial legislation varies, however, and in several provinces, CFMP officers can enforce neither traffic legislation nor mental health legislation — even on military bases. The CFMP maintains an investigations branch, the Canadian Forces National Investigation Service, which has the ability to investigate any crime concerning DND property or employees, except for sexual assault and intimate partner violence.

==== Railway police ====
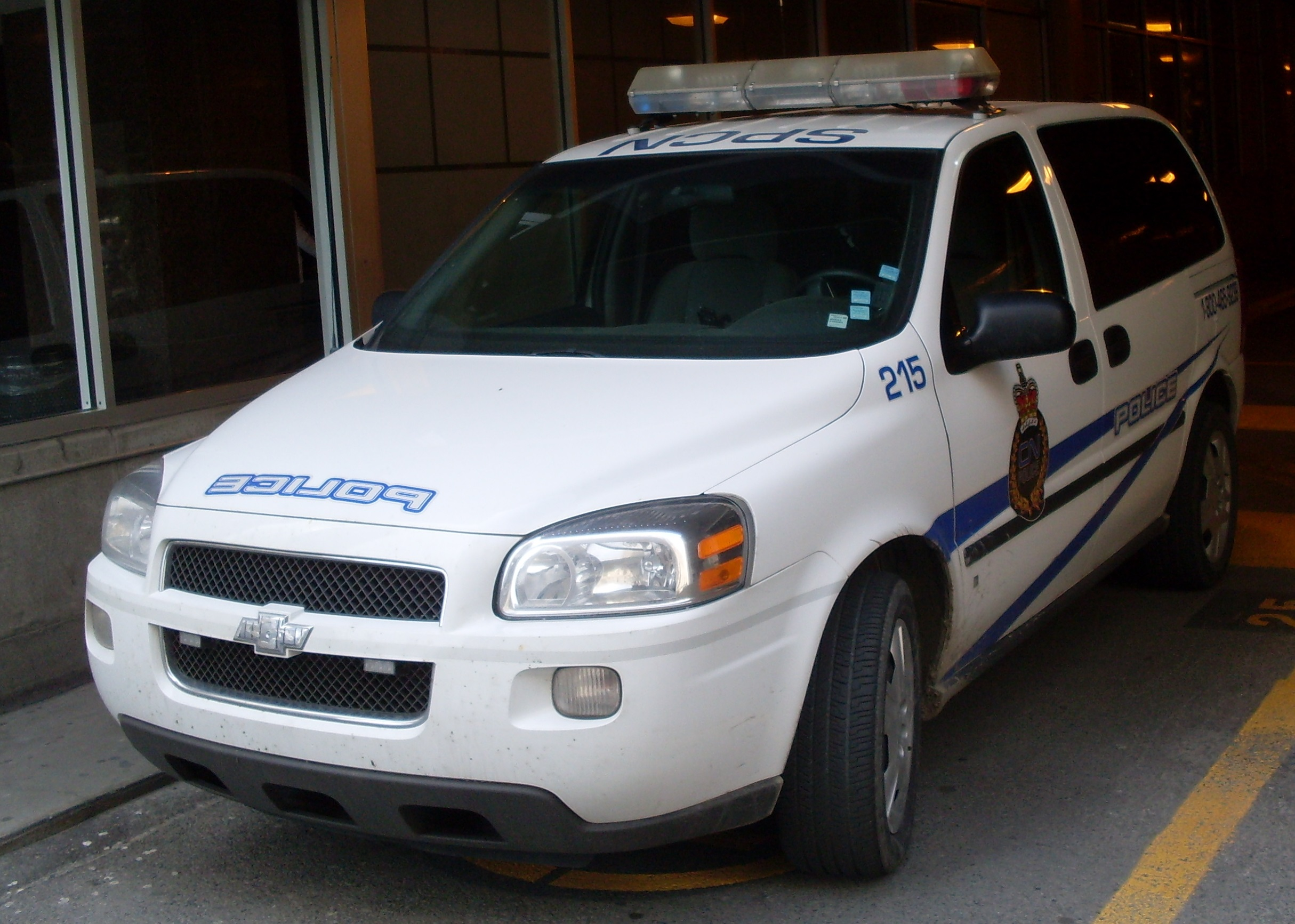
A Chevrolet Uplander used by the Canadian National Railway Police.

Under the Railway Safety Act, any federally regulated railway in Canada can request that a superior court judge appoint railway employees as police officers. These officers are hired, trained, and employed by the railway for the purposes of preventing crimes against the company and the protection of goods, materials, and public rail transit being moved through the railway network, and have nationwide jurisdiction within 500 metres of a railway line or as it relates to railway operations. As of 2023, the Canadian National Railway, the Canadian Pacific Kansas City railway, and Via Rail — a Crown Corporation — each maintain their own police service.

TransLink, the transit authority for the Metro Vancouver Regional District in British Columbia, maintains a police force authorized by the province as opposed to the federal Railway Safety Act. Some smaller railways and transit authorities, such as GO Transit, also maintain provincially regulated special constabularies to protect passengers and property. These agencies are authorized by provincial governments and are not related to federally authorized Railway Safety Act police forces.

Railway police have attracted scrutiny and criticism for their privately funded nature and role in investigating train derailments. In 2020, a former Canadian Pacific Police Service officer alleged that he was ordered to stop investigating a fatal railway derailment to protect the railway's interests.

=== Provincial police ===
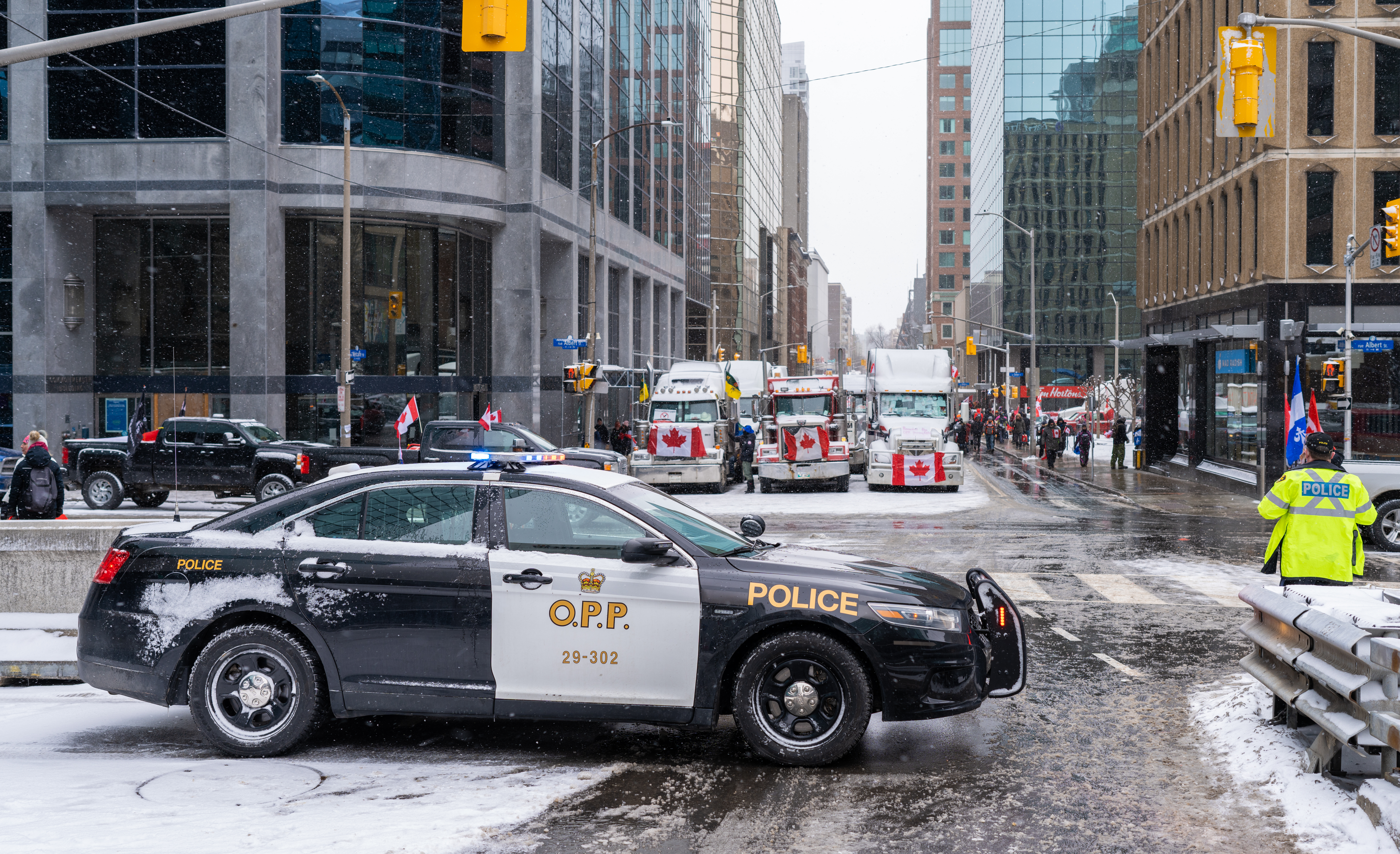
An Ontario Provincial Police officer patrols the Ottawa convoy occupation protest in 2022.

There are eight provincial police services in Canada, maintained by six provinces, although only five are involved in frontline policing. The Ontario Provincial Police and Sûreté du Québec provide provincial police services to Ontario and Quebec, respectively; the Royal Newfoundland Constabulary provides community and provincial police services to select urban communities in Newfoundland and Labrador; the Independent Agency Police Service of Alberta and the Saskatchewan Marshals Service provide supplemental provincial policing to Alberta and Saskatchewan; and the Organized Crime Agency of British Columbia, the Unité permanente anticorruption, and the Bureau des enquêtes indépendantes provide specialized criminal law enforcement services in British Columbia and Quebec.

The Ontario Provincial Police and Sûreté du Québec are responsible for both provincial police services, such as the policing of provincial highways, investigation of major crimes, and protection of provincial leaders, and the delivery of local police services to municipalities that do not maintain their own police forces, usually under contract. In Ontario, the OPP provides police services to municipalities without independent police forces regardless of whether or not there is a contract in place for them to do so, but contracts enable municipalities to direct police priorities, have a role in selecting detachment commanders, and review police service performance, including complaints, on a regular basis. In Quebec, contract police services are available to any municipality — outside of those in urban agglomerations — with fewer than 50,000 residents. In 2021, a provincial committee recommended that the population threshold for contract police services be raised to 130,000 residents and that police forces serving populations under this threshold be folded into the Sûreté du Québec.

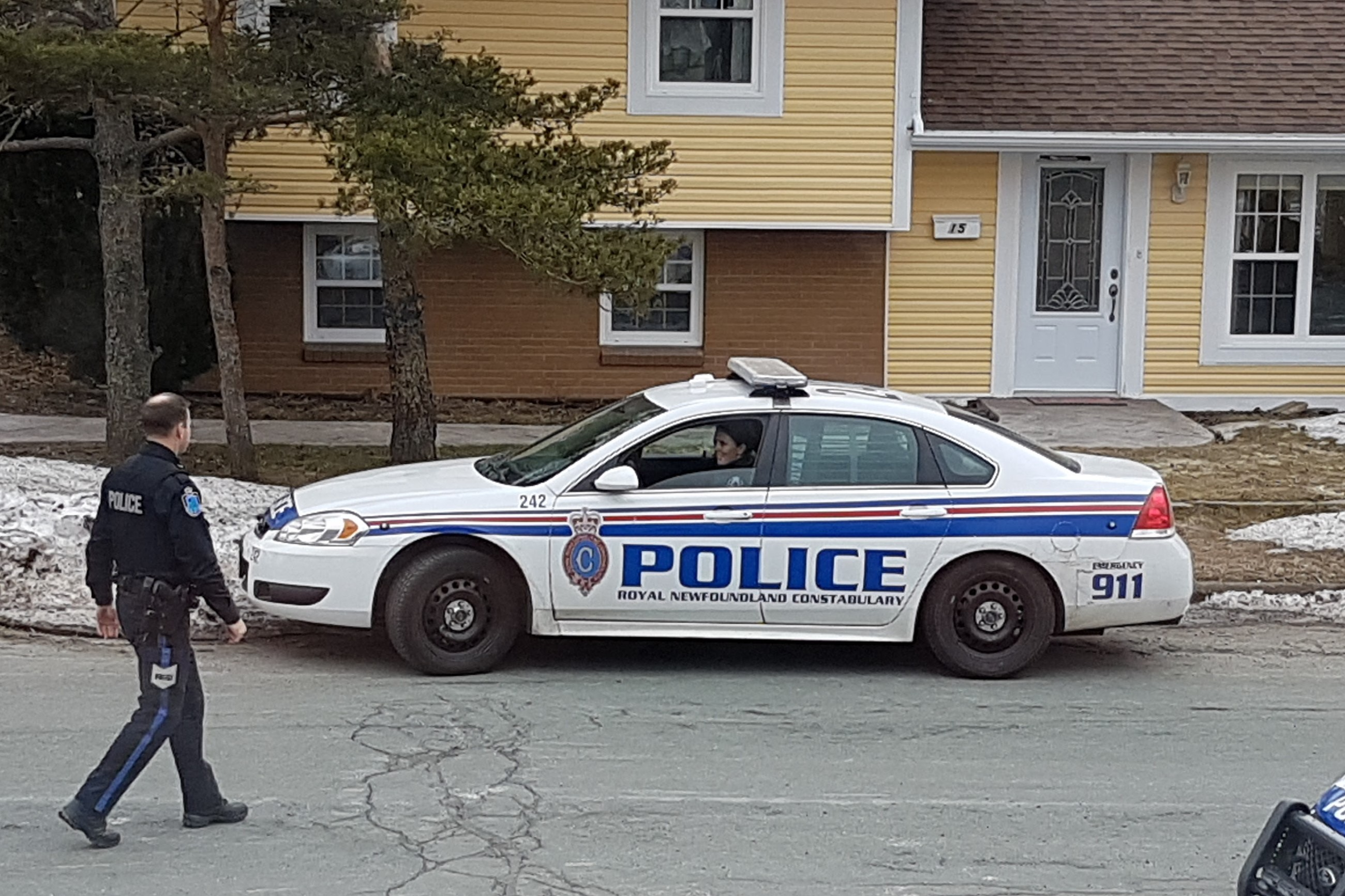
A Royal Newfoundland Constabulary officer speaks with a colleague in her patrol car.

The Royal Newfoundland Constabulary is a provincial police force, but does not provide provincial police services across the entire province. Instead, the responsibility for provincial police services is split between the RCMP, which provides local and provincial police services to Newfoundland and Labrador's largely rural interior, and the Constabulary, which provides local and provincial police services to the northeast Avalon Peninsula (metropolitan St. John's); the Bay of Islands and the Humber Valley (metropolitan Corner Brook); and western Labrador (Churchill Falls, Labrador City, and Wabush).

The Independent Agency Police Service (IAPS) and Saskatchewan Marshals Service (SMS) are independent, provincial police services that are currently being established in Alberta and Saskatchewan. IAPS was first established in 2024, and hired its first chief of police on July 2, 2025; the service will eventually provide municipal police services under contract as an alternative to the RCMP, as well as general provincial law enforcement services and support to understaffed RCMP detachments under the name "Alberta Sheriffs Police Service". The SMS was established in 2023 and began policing operations in May of 2025; unlike the IAPS, which will primarily provide municipal police services, the SMS is focussed on providing operational support to existing police forces and investigating agricultural crimes.

The Organized Crime Agency of British Columbia (OCABC) is legally defined as a designated policing unit, and is the "core agency" of the Combined Forces Special Enforcement Unit – British Columbia (CFSEU-BC). Although the OCABC still technically exists as of 2022, its officers are limited to conducting operations and investigations within the CFSEU-BC, where it has been it largely superseded by RCMP and municipal police officers seconded to the unit. Despite its status as the core agency of the combined unit, the CFSEU-BC is governed by RCMP policies and procedures rather than the policies and procedures of the OCABC. Although the Metro Vancouver Transit Police and Stlʼatlʼimx Tribal Police Service fall into the same designated policing unit category as the OCABC, they have neither the province-wide mandate nor the direct provincial funding the OCABC does.

The Unité permanente anticorruption was created in 2011 and tasked with investigations into corrupt government procurement practices, but relied on secondments from other police services until 2018, when it became its own police force. The Quebec Police Act also defines the Bureau des enquêtes indépendantes as a provincial police force, but its role is strictly limited to police oversight and its members are appointed as peace officers only for the purposes of investigating police shootings, allegations of sexual assault made against police officers, and other investigations against police officers and special constables as directed by the Minister of Public Security. Similar oversight agencies exist in other provinces, but are not defined as police services.

=== Municipal police ===
Vancouver Police Department officers and marked patrol vehicle at a community event in Vancouver.

Municipal police forces make up the bulk of Canadian police services, and are generally responsible for all criminal matters within their jurisdiction. There are municipal police services in nine provinces, with 12 in British Columbia, seven in Alberta, 12 in Saskatchewan, 10 in Manitoba, 44 in Ontario, 31 in Quebec, nine in New Brunswick, 10 in Nova Scotia, and three in Prince Edward Island. Almost every major city in Canada maintains a municipal police service, and the majority of municipal police forces serve urban areas exclusively. Many rural communities also operate police services, however, and several have only a handful of police officers. The police services in the Town of Luseland, Saskatchewan, and the Rural Municipality of Cornwallis, Manitoba both have one officer each. As the delivery of police services is a provincial responsibility, each province has its own set of standards that police services must meet. In several provinces, such as Ontario, police services must be able to provide 24/7 coverage, investigate all criminal matters, and provide for specialized units such as police dogs, while other provinces allow small police forces to rely on outside resources to routinely supplement their patrols and investigations. Some provinces, such as Manitoba, do not define a minimum standard of "adequate and effective" policing, while others, such as Quebec, authorize several tiers of police forces based on the size of the municipality, with the lowest tiers providing only basic patrol and law enforcement functions and the highest tiers responsible for all law enforcement, investigations, and policing in their jurisdiction.

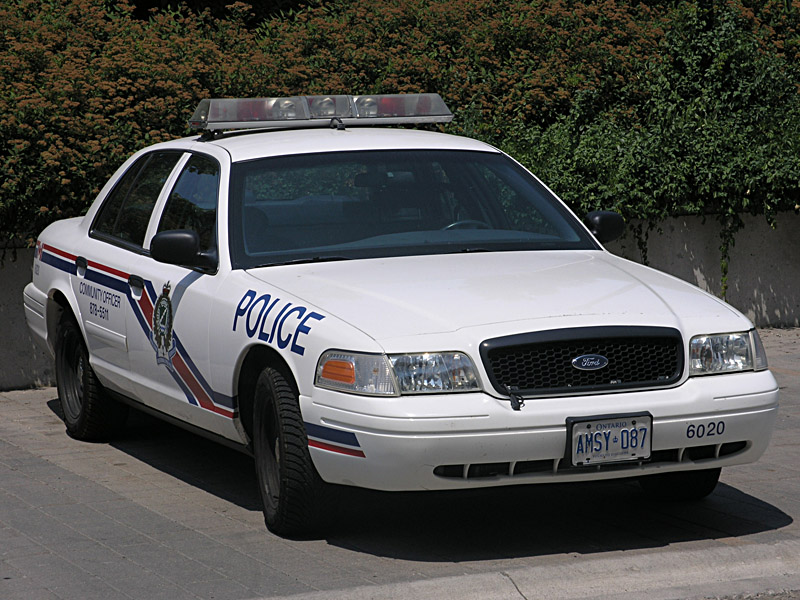
A Halton Regional Police Service scout car.

Beginning in the 1970s, and continuing into the 1990s, several municipal police forces were amalgamated (alongside, in many cases, the municipalities they served) into new, regional organizations in the interest of creating efficiencies and reducing costs. As of 2022, there are regional police forces in British Columbia, Alberta, Saskatchewan, Manitoba, Ontario, Quebec, New Brunswick, and Nova Scotia. The adoption of regional policing has been controversial, however, and a review of nine Canadian police services in 2016 found that there were no significant differences in cost or service quality between regional and non-regional police forces, and a separate 2015 literature review found that larger police services are less effective and more expensive than those serving about 50 000 people. As of 2022, police regionalization continues to be proposed by both provinces and municipalities, particularly in metropolitan areas where several urban municipalities that border one another each maintain independent police services.

=== Strength ===
Map of police officers per 100,000 population across Canada, 2012. <176 176–200 201–300 301–400 >400

In 2022, there were 70 566 active police officers in Canada, out of a total authorized strength (the maximum number of officers all the police forces in Canada combined are allowed to hire) of 74 528. Additionally, there were 32 717 non-sworn support personnel employed by police services across the country.

Canadian police strength reached a peak in 1975, when there were 206 officers per 100,000 people. Although the current number reflects a significant rise in the total police strength in the country (the highest in twelve years after steady declines in the 1980s and 1990s), Canada still employs fewer police officers per capita than Wales (262/100,000).

Provincially, Nova Scotia had the highest number of officers per capita (193.8/100,000) in 2019. The lowest numbers per capita were in Prince Edward Island and New Brunswick. The three territories, while having far fewer police officers in absolute terms, have around twice as many police officers per capita as the more populous, less remote provinces.

Police strength, by province and territory
Annual Rate: Police Officers per 100,000 Population
	2003	2004	2005	2006	2007	2008	2009	2010	2011	2012	2013	2014	2015	2016	2017	2018
Canada	187.8	187.2	189.3	191.8	195.0	197.4	200.0	203.1	202.2	200.2	197.4	194.2	192.6	190.7	188.9	185.0
Newfoundland and Labrador	148.1	148.0	150.9	156.5	164.6	172.8	177.5	179.9	178.1	175.9	174.0	169.5	168.3	171.9	172.4	171.3
Prince Edward Island	158.9	150.4	154.3	159.6	164.8	166.5	167.3	168.0	169.5	170.9	161.0	163.6	156.4	154.5	147.4	141.0
Nova Scotia	171.5	171.9	173.1	177.7	188.0	199.2	200.1	203.0	202.7	205.0	201.5	200.7	198.1	193.3	192.6	193.8
New Brunswick	170.8	173.7	173.4	173.1	177.9	181.4	181.9	185.6	182.2	179.9	177.2	170.0	168.4	168.3	160.9	159.5
Quebec	192.0	191.4	194.6	197.8	198.0	198.5	198.0	196.6	197.4	198.2	197.3	198.7	195.9	194.0	191.4	189.3
Ontario	189.8	187.4	186.9	187.6	191.6	193.6	196.6	200.3	199.0	196.1	195.1	192.0	191.2	188.6	184.6	176.8
Manitoba	195.7	193.1	191.5	195.4	202.5	202.0	206.6	208.8	210.2	216.5	212.8	206.9	201.4	194.7	192.6	188.7
Saskatchewan	200.4	201.5	202.4	204.6	204.2	208.8	206.3	218.9	216.3	212.0	209.7	206.1	203.9	202.6	203.3	186.4
Alberta	157.0	158.1	160.6	163.8	162.3	159.5	168.5	177.0	176.7	175.2	173.3	171.2	172.6	174.3	176.3	174.4
British Columbia	172.4	170.2	177.4	181.0	188.2	187.0	195.6	198.4	198.8	194.6	191.3	184.2	181.6	180.3	182.1	185.2
Yukon	400.5	384.5	376.1	359.5	365.5	353.6	361.7	349.8	344.5	328.4	361.4	363.5	344.9	358.0	323.0	326.1
Northwest Territories	383.0	394.9	398.6	396.0	403.5	410.6	454.2	466.7	452.8	455.9	438.3	437.5	454.4	445.7	407.2	416.5
Nunavut	412.7	412.0	399.0	395.9	391.8	373.1	383.4	395.8	380.2	360.5	362.2	330.8	359.0	354.3	356.8	354.2
Notes: Represents actual police officer strength as of June 15 up to 2005; and as of May 15 since 2006. Total for Canada includes police officers in the Royal Canadian Mounted Police headquarters, training academy depot division and forensic labs; these are excluded from provincial/territorial totals.

== Special constabularies ==
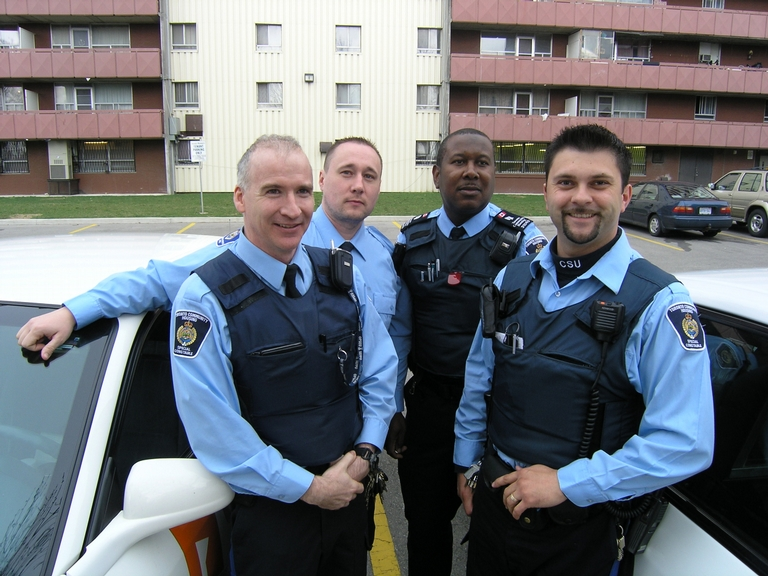
Special constables employed by the Toronto Community Housing Corporation's special constabulary, the Community Safety Unit.

A special constabulary is any law enforcement organization composed of special constables or other peace officers ― as opposed to police officers ― with a mandate for criminal law enforcement or proactive peacekeeping and security. Their members are usually unarmed, and their duties may consist of providing frontline specialized police services for a transit agency, housing authority, park authority, or university campus; proactive community policing, crime prevention, and enhanced civil law enforcement for a municipality or First Nation; or security policing and law enforcement for an institution or legislature.

Unlike police services, special constabularies only provide supplementary policing and do not replace the police service of jurisdiction. Although officers employed by special constabularies have the authority to investigate crimes and make arrests or issue citations for offences that occur in their area of authority, and some special constabularies may even have primary or exclusive responsibility for some low-level criminal offences or civil law enforcement in that area; they do not have ultimate responsibility for law enforcement and policing, and special constabularies are required to turn certain offences over to, or operate under the supervision of, the jurisdictional police service.

In Canada, special constables (referred to as peace officers in Alberta and safety officers in Manitoba) are sworn peace officers granted police powers to enforce specific legislation in a distinct context or geographic area, and may be employed by a range of organizations other than special constabularies. Special constabularies are generally referred to as special constable services, protective services, or, in some cases, as police services.

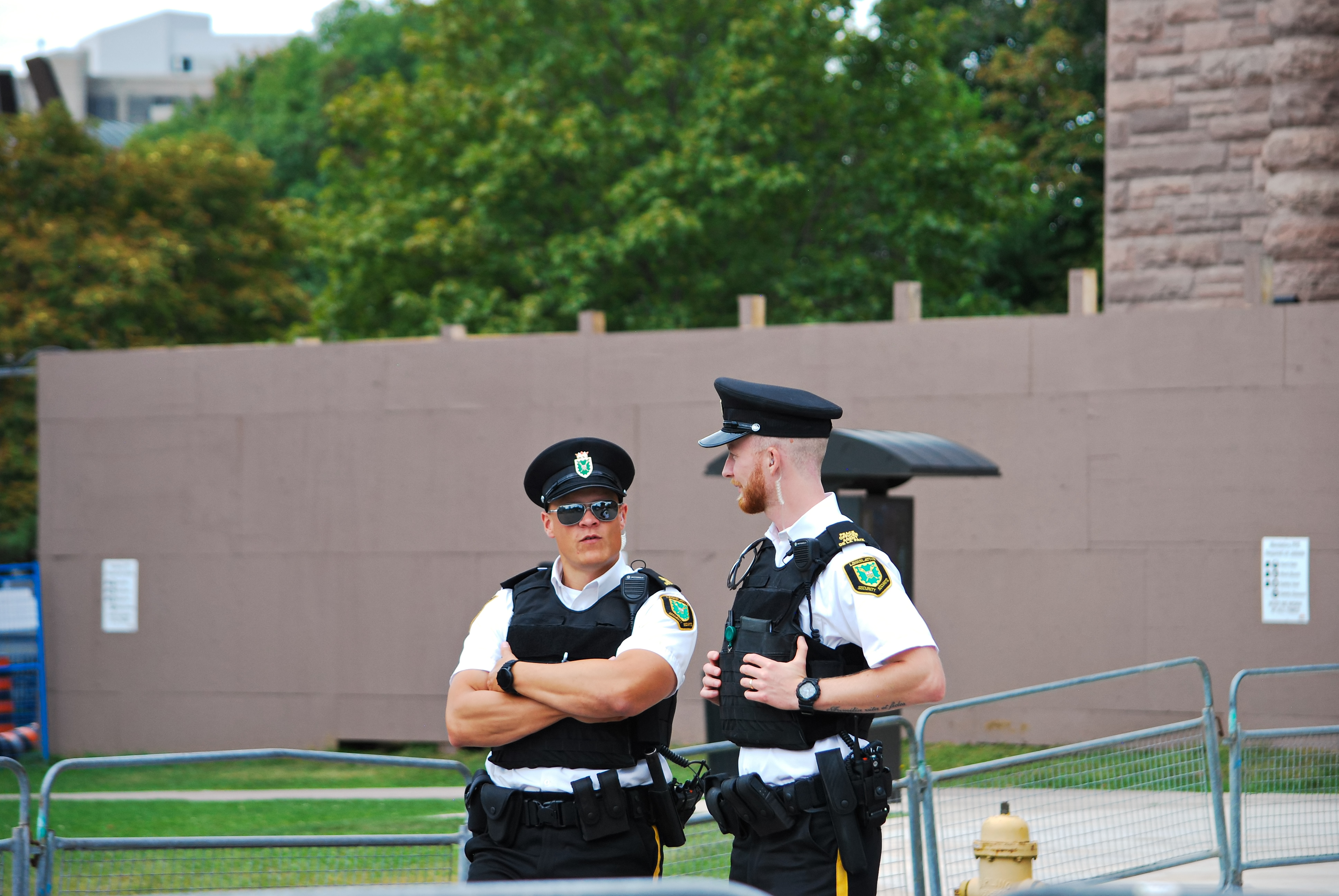
Members of the Ontario Legislative Protective Service (then called the Legislative Security Service) posted outside the provincial parliament in 2019

=== Legislative security ===
British Columbia, Ontario, Québec, and Saskatchewan maintain special constabularies for the purposes of protecting their provincial legislatures. Select special constables in British Columbia and Ontario were armed with handguns in the wake of the 2014 Parliament Hill shooting. In Alberta, legislative security is provided by the Alberta Sheriffs Branch, an armed provincial law enforcement agency also responsible for courtroom security, traffic enforcement on provincial highways, and some criminal investigations. In Saskatchewan, in addition to the Legislative District Security Unit, the Provincial Protective Service (responsible for the provincial highway patrol, sheriffs officers, and conservation officers) maintains a special constabulary that patrols Wascana Centre, the park that surrounds the provincial legislature. The federal parliament buildings in Ottawa are protected by the Parliamentary Protective Service, which was formed by amalgamating the House of Commons Security Services, Senate Protective Service, and the RCMP parliamentary precinct detachment. The Service, which was formed after the 2014 Parliament Hill shooting, is not a special constabulary, and only some of its members have the powers of a peace officer.

=== Community special constabularies ===
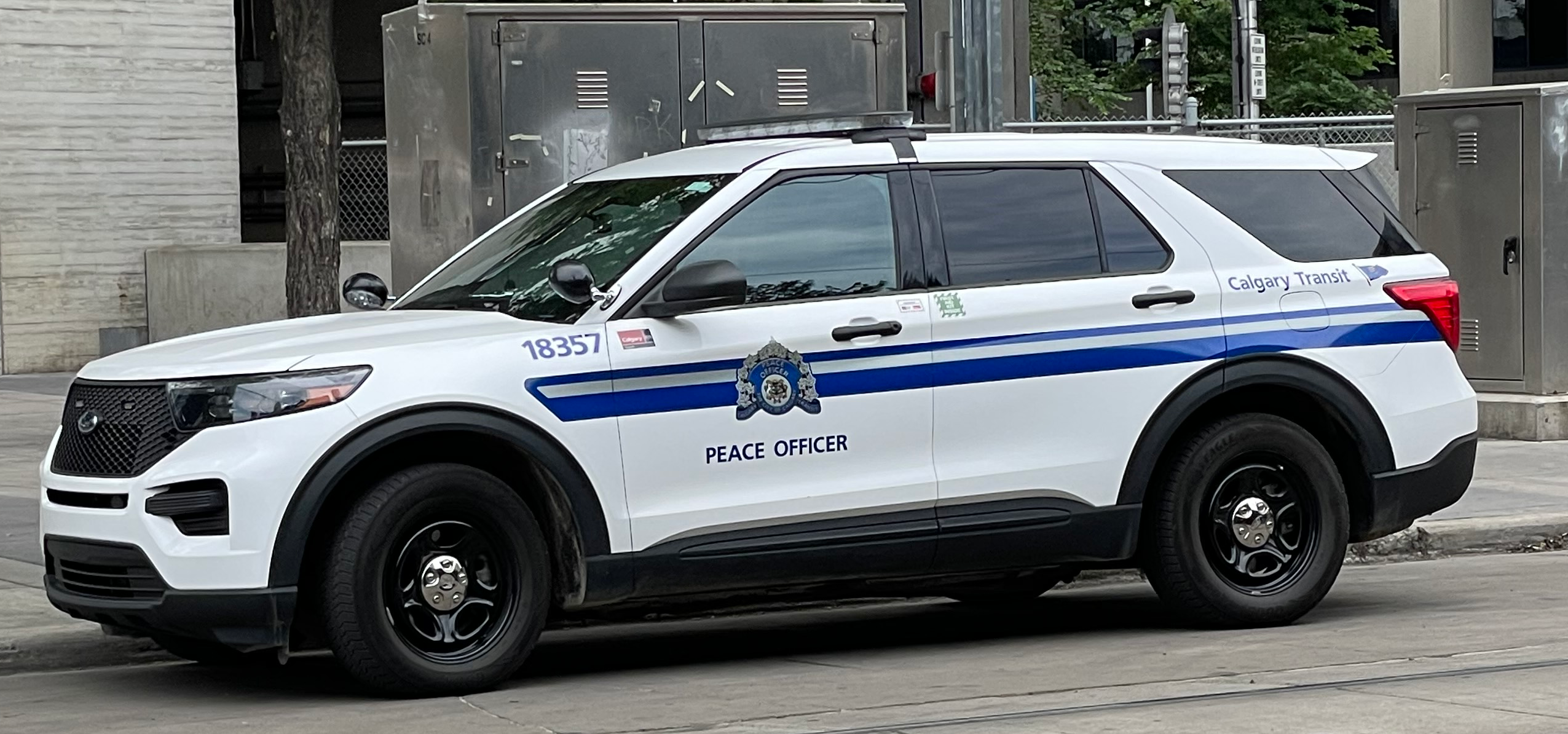
A Calgary Transit Peace Officer cruiser parked in downtown Calgary, Alberta.

In Alberta, Saskatchewan, and Manitoba, municipalities and First Nations are able to raise special constabularies to provide community police services; enforce non-criminal legislation; and assist jurisdictional police in securing crime and incident scenes. These agencies are composed of community peace officers (in Alberta), community safety officers (in Saskatchewan), and community/First Nation safety officers (in Manitoba) who are authorized to enforce municipal by-laws and provincial legislation, make arrests and detain members of the public, conduct traffic stops, and, in some cases, conduct investigations into non-emergency criminal offences. Officers employed by these agencies are generally unarmed, but may carry firearms to destroy injured animals.

Because these special constabularies are provincially regulated, the exact duties, powers, and regulations governing their operations vary slightly between each province. In Manitoba, for example, community/First Nation safety officers are strictly prohibited from enforcing criminal legislation, while some officers in Saskatchewan and Alberta are empowered to enforce certain Criminal Code violations.

=== Other special constable employers ===
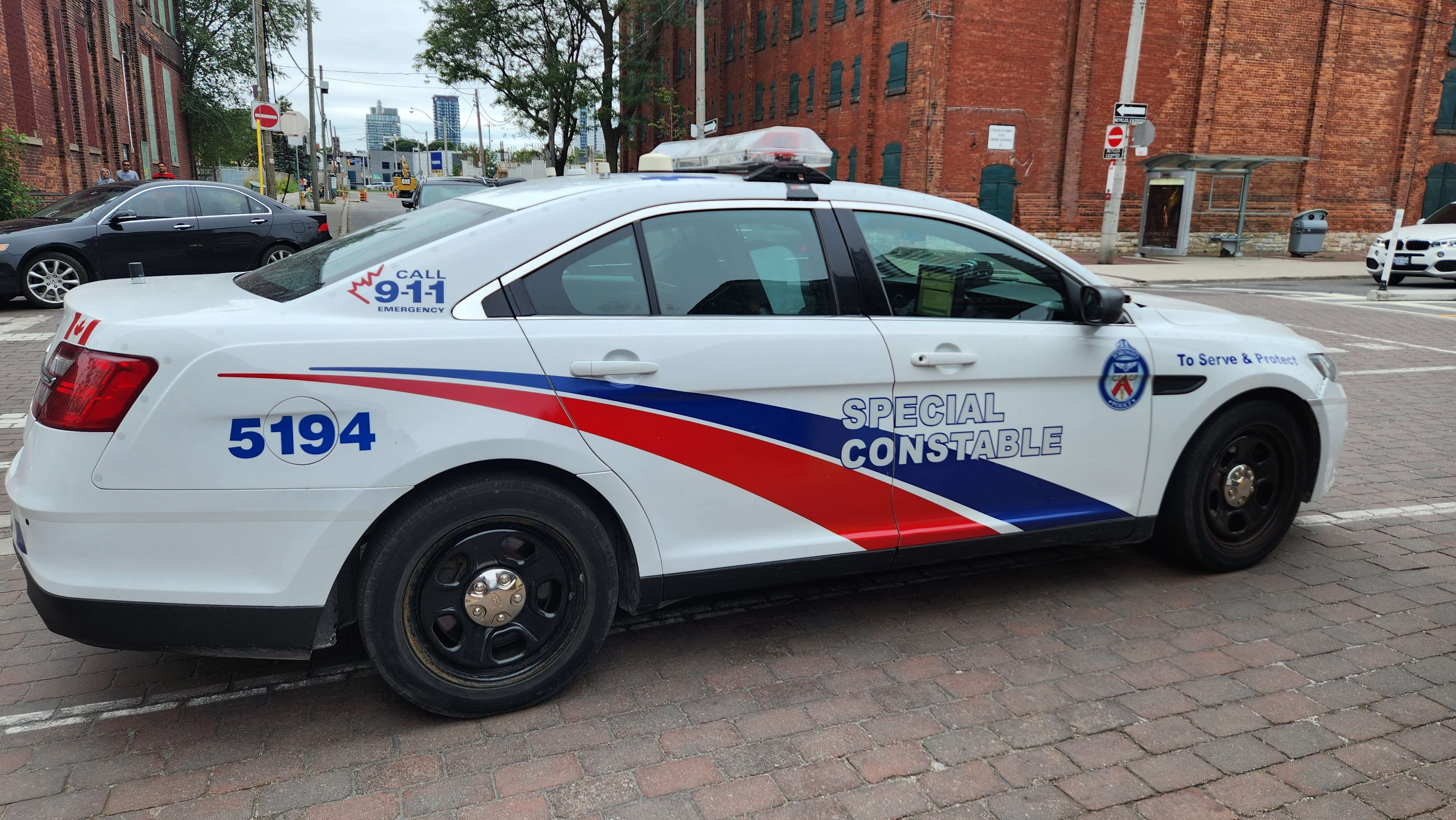
A sedan used by special constables employed by the Toronto Police Service.

Although special constables are often employed by special constabularies, they are also employed by government agencies that require investigators or traffic agents to have some police authority, by police services as part of a tiered police service delivery model, or by civil law enforcement agencies in jurisdictions that do not authorize a specific class of civil law enforcement officer. Special constabularies are differentiated from other types of special constable employers by their proactive, uniformed, and semi-independent role in community safety and delivery of police-style services, as opposed to the limited mandate of reactive law enforcement and investigations of other special constable employers or the integrated role of special constables employed by police services.

== Civil law enforcement ==
Civil law enforcement agencies are responsible for the specialized enforcement of civil legislation. Civil law enforcement agencies are maintained by every level of government, a variety of government corporations and authorities, and First Nations.

The powers of civil law enforcement agencies vary significantly. Some, such as the Saskatchewan Highway Patrol, have the authority to enforce criminal legislation in addition to their primary mandate to enforce civil legislation, while others are limited to enforcing only a handful of by-laws. Regardless of the breadth of their legislative authority, all civil law enforcement officers in Canada are considered peace officers for the purposes of carrying out their duties, and may be variously appointed as special constables, municipal law enforcement officers, provincial offences officers, or generically as peace officers.

=== Federal ===
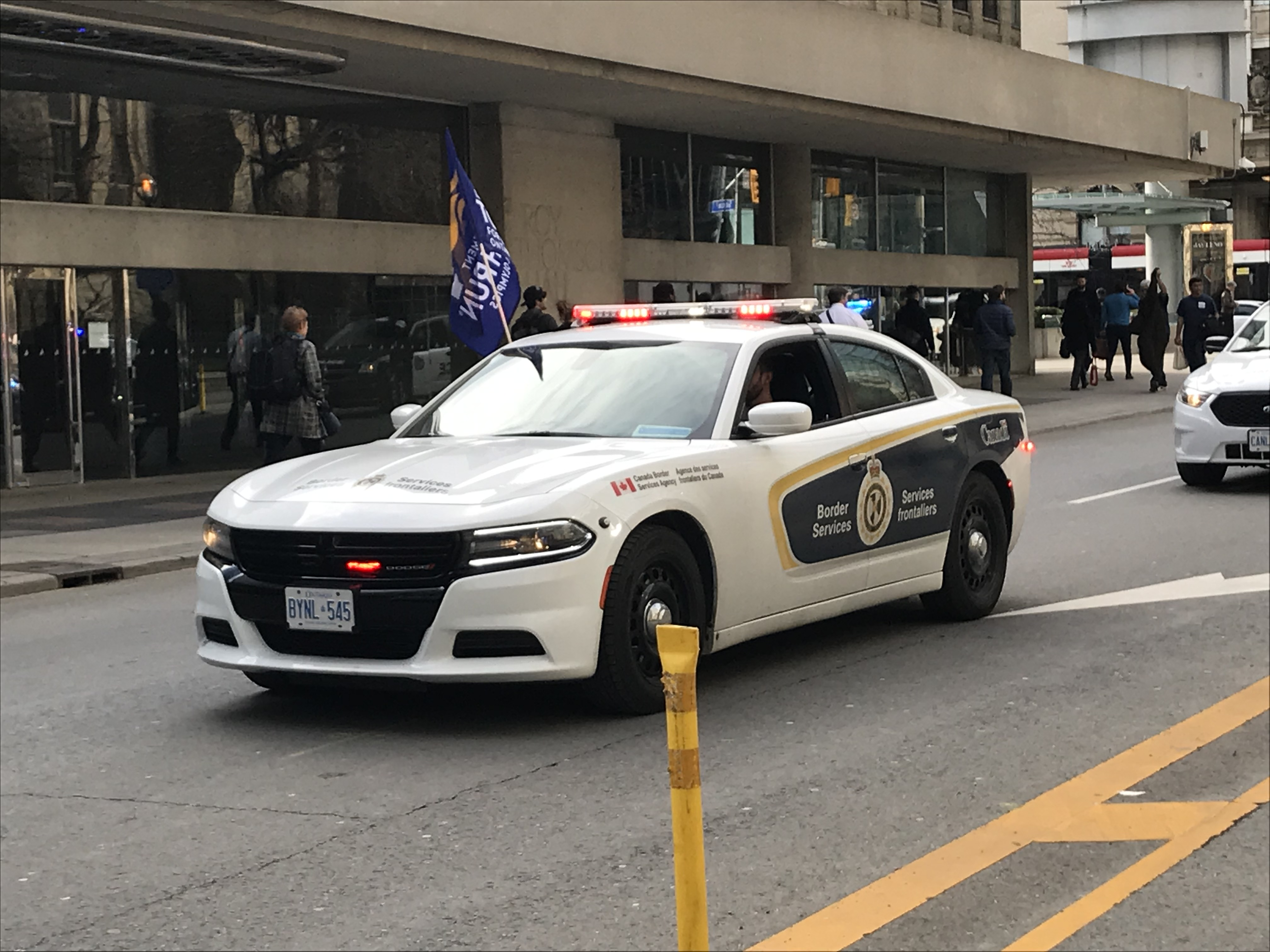
A Canada Border Services Agency patrol car.

The federal government maintains several civil law enforcement agencies, most prominent among them the Canada Border Services Agency, which manages Canadian ports of entry and enforces the Customs Act, the Immigration and Refugee Protection Act, and the Quarantine Act. The Agency also operates a Criminal Investigations Unit that investigates criminal violations of CBSA-enforced legislation, such as smuggling or immigration fraud. The government of Canada also employs fishery officers, who enforce federal fishing and fishery regulations; transport inspectors, who enforce the 23 different pieces of federal transportation legislation the Minister of Transport is responsible for; and Environment and Climate Change Canada enforcement officers, who are responsible for enforcing federal environmental regulations. The Canada Revenue Agency operates a variety of compliance and enforcement divisions, but its proactive criminal enforcement unit, which collaborated with RCMP officers to break up organized crime rings, was disbanded after budget cuts in 2012. (The RCMP disbanded its various counterparts to the CRA's criminal enforcement unit between 2012 and 2020.) The federal government also operates the Competition Bureau, which enforces the Competition Act, the Consumer Packaging and Labelling Act, the Textile Labelling Act and the Precious Metals Marking Act. Parks Canada maintains a park warden service, which is responsible for the enforcement of the Canada National Parks Act, the Species at Risk Act, and park-specific legislation.

=== Provincial and territorial ===
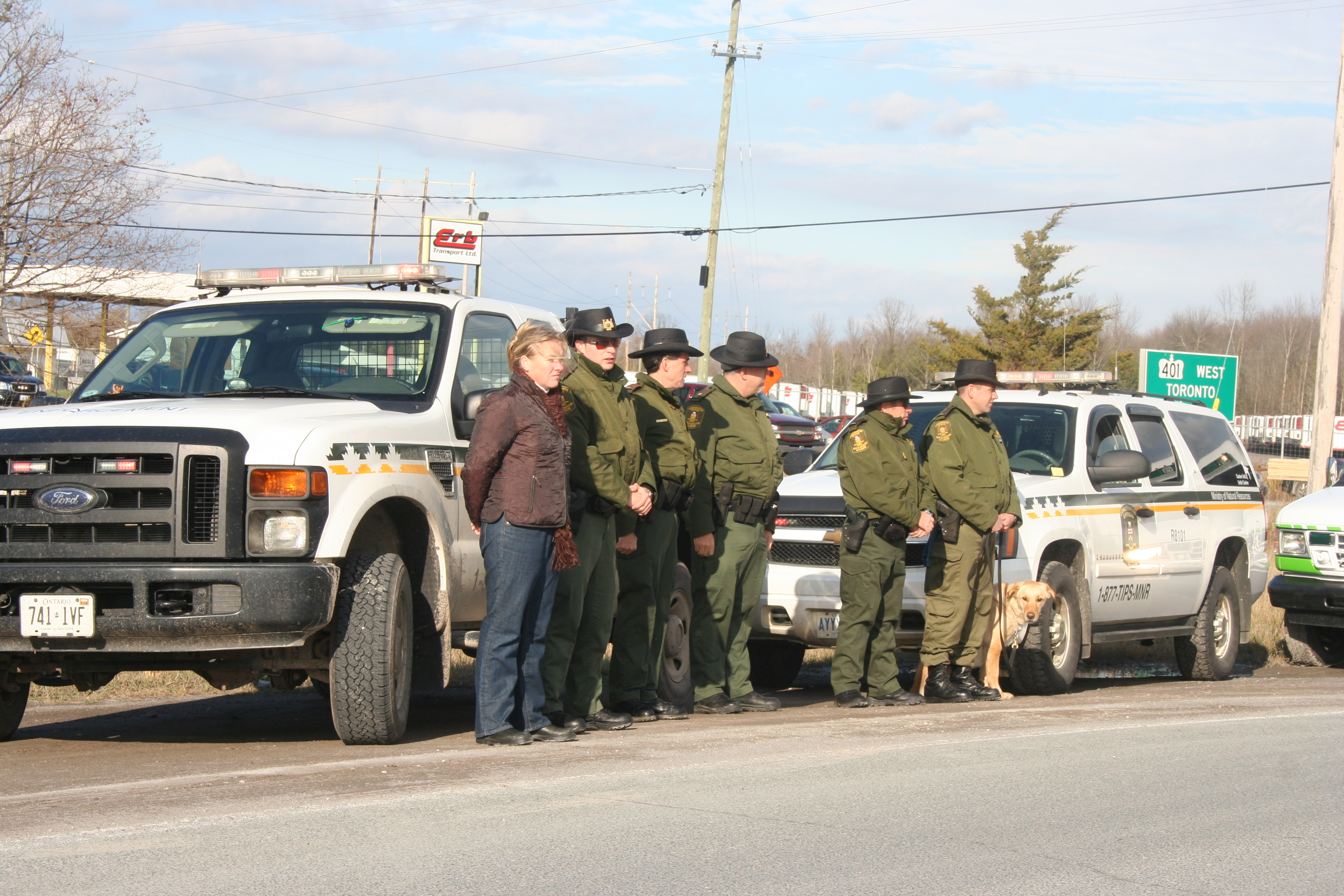
Enforcement officers with the Ontario Ministry of Natural Resources and Forestry standing alongside Ontario Highway 401 at Trenton for a Highway of Heroes procession in 2009.

Each province and territory in Canada operates or authorizes a variety of civil law enforcement agencies, including employment standards and workplace safety offices, animal cruelty organizations, and environmental enforcement services. Because of the wide-ranging regulatory powers of provinces, and the technical, specialized nature of much of civil law enforcement, many provincial civil law enforcement agencies operate in obscurity. The two most prominent uniformed civil law enforcement services operated by provinces and territories are commercial vehicle and conservation enforcement agencies, which usually maintain proactive patrols and education programs. While conservation officers in every province and territory are routinely armed, only the provinces of Alberta, Saskatchewan, Quebec and New Brunswick deploy armed commercial vehicle enforcement officers. Some provinces, such as Ontario, empower provincial corporations and authorities to establish and maintain their own civil law enforcement agencies, separate from the provincial government.

==== Sheriffs services ====
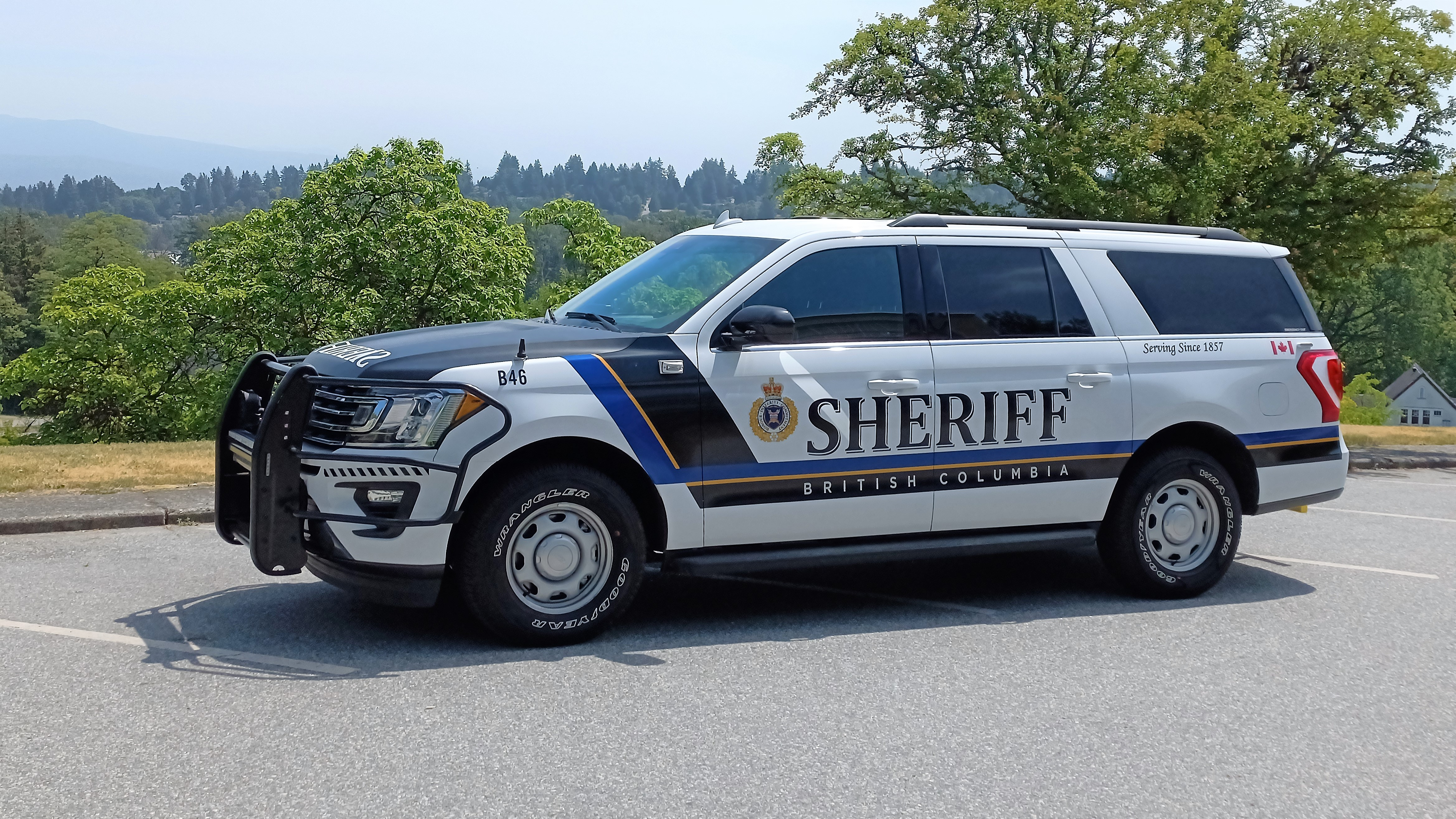
A British Columbia Sheriff Service Ford Expedition

Almost every province and territory in Canada maintains a sheriffs service, although their role and powers vary between jurisdictions. In most provinces and all three territories, sheriffs are limited to providing courtroom security, enforcing court orders, and transporting offenders to and from court. In Quebec, sheriffs have no security function and are instead limited to enforcing court orders and selecting juries. Since 2006, the province of Alberta has gradually expanded the mandate and powers of its sheriffs service, which now maintains a highway patrol, a criminal investigations unit, and provides legislative security to the Legislative Assembly of Alberta. Ontario is the only province or territory in Canada that does not maintain a sheriffs service — instead, court security and prisoner transport duties are handled by local police services, and the enforcement of court orders is the responsibility of the Superior Court of Justice Enforcement Office, which was named and is still sometimes referred to as the sheriff's office.

Alberta and Saskatchewan had provincial police forces in the 1910s and 1920s.

=== Municipal ===
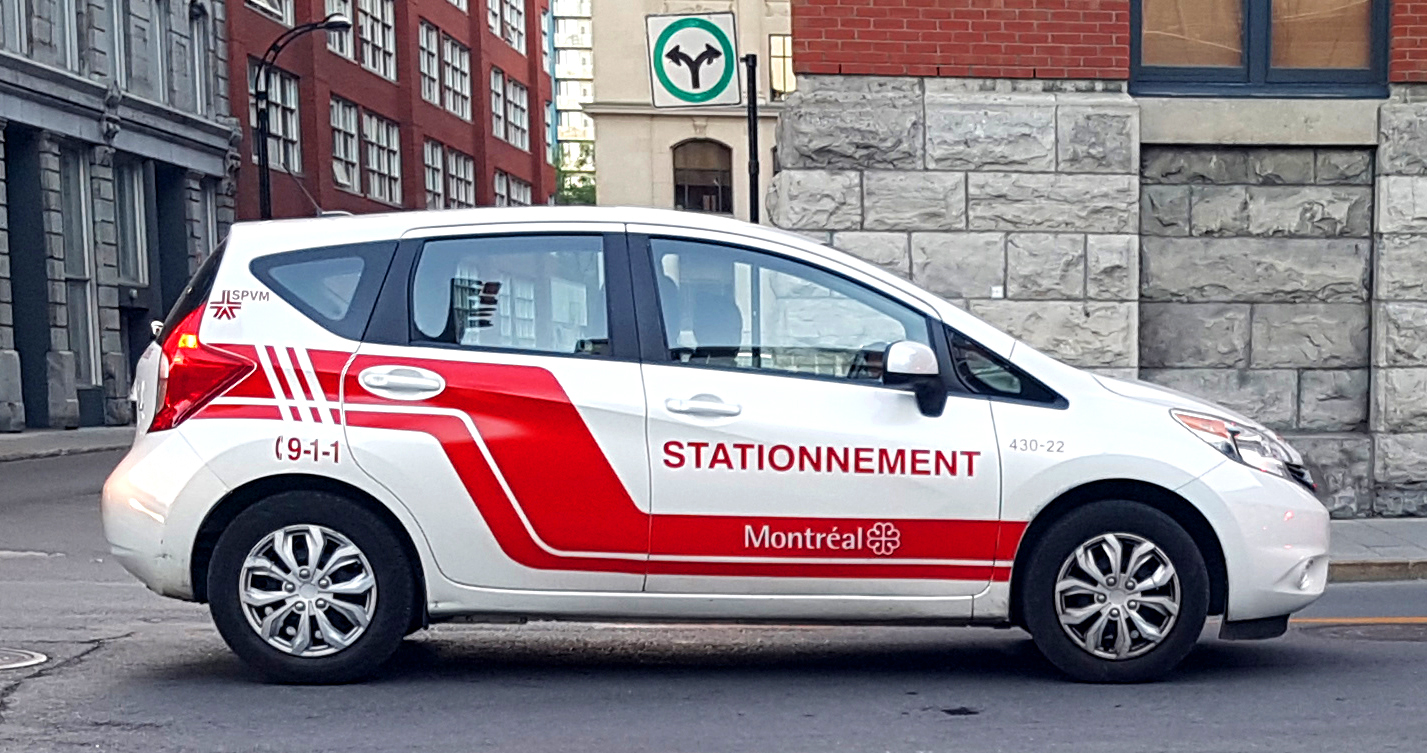
A vehicle used by the Service de police de la Ville de Montréal for parking enforcement in Montreal

Every municipality in Canada is authorized to develop and enforce municipal by-laws, but each province and territory regulates the authority of municipal law enforcement agencies differently. In British Columbia, Manitoba, Ontario, Nova Scotia, and Prince Edward Island, municipal enforcement agencies are generally limited to the enforcement of municipal legislation and operate on an as-requested basis. In all three territories, as well as the provinces of Newfoundland and Labrador, Quebec, Saskatchewan, and Alberta, some — but not all — municipal enforcement agencies also enforce provincial legislation and control traffic. Several municipalities rely on police services or contracted commissionaires for bylaw enforcement.

== Indigenous law enforcement ==
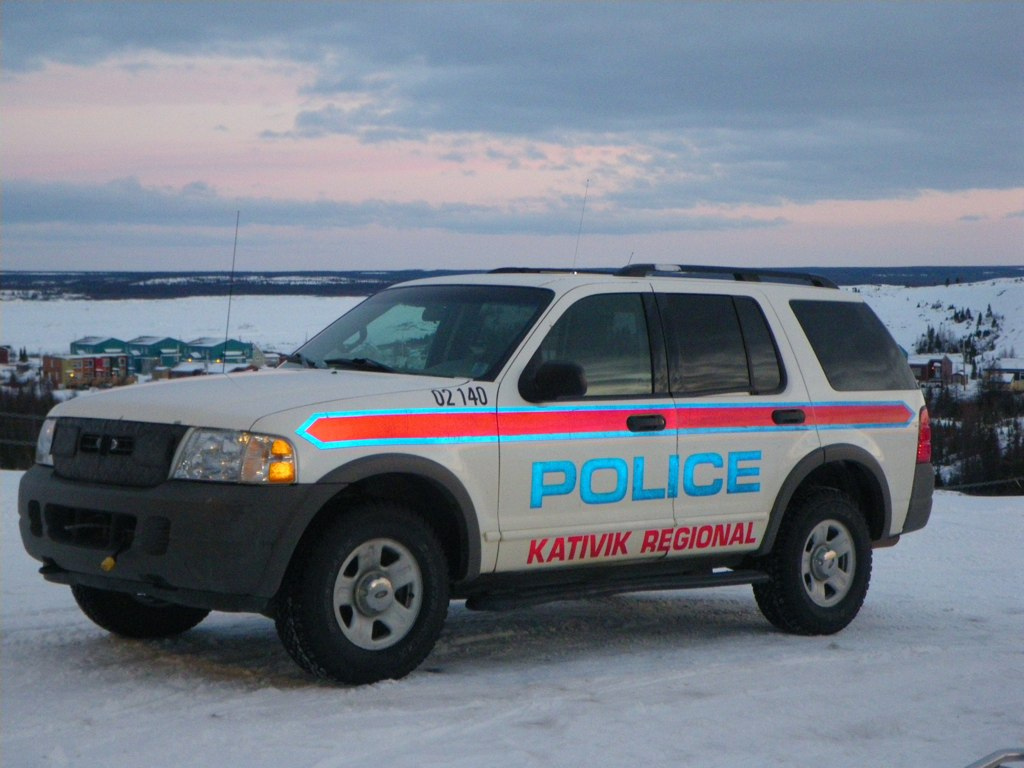
A patrol car belonging to the Kativik Regional Police Force (now the Nunavik Police Service), an arm of the Kativik Regional Government. The Regional Government was established as a result of the James Bay and Northern Quebec Agreement and serves a population that is mostly Inuit.

Indigenous peoples in Canada are defined in the Constitution Act, 1982 as First Nations, Inuit, and Métis peoples, and the law enforcement powers of Indigenous governments vary significantly between the different groups. Métis self-government exists only in eight settlements in Alberta, none of which have the authority to raise police services, but may, with provincial approval, establish bylaw enforcement agencies. The territory of Nunavut and regional government of Kativik, both of which are populated mostly by Inuit peoples, were established after Inuit land claims agreements, but are not exclusive to Inuit peoples, have authority over police services. First Nations and Inuit communities governed by the Indian Act have access to the First Nations and Inuit Policing Program operated by Public Safety Canada and can establish their own police forces, funded entirely by the federal and provincial governments, but most Inuit governments and First Nations that have completed the comprehensive land claims process can only contract police services to a third party police force (although frameworks exist for these Nations to eventually establish their own independent police services). Because of the history of the Canadian reserve system, which operated on the assumption that Indigenous families required less land than settler families and routinely gave away reserve lands to settlers without Indigenous consultation or consent, many reserves are too small to sustain independent police forces, requiring First Nations to form regional police agencies with neighbouring communities or contract with the federal or provincial governments for police services.

=== Background ===
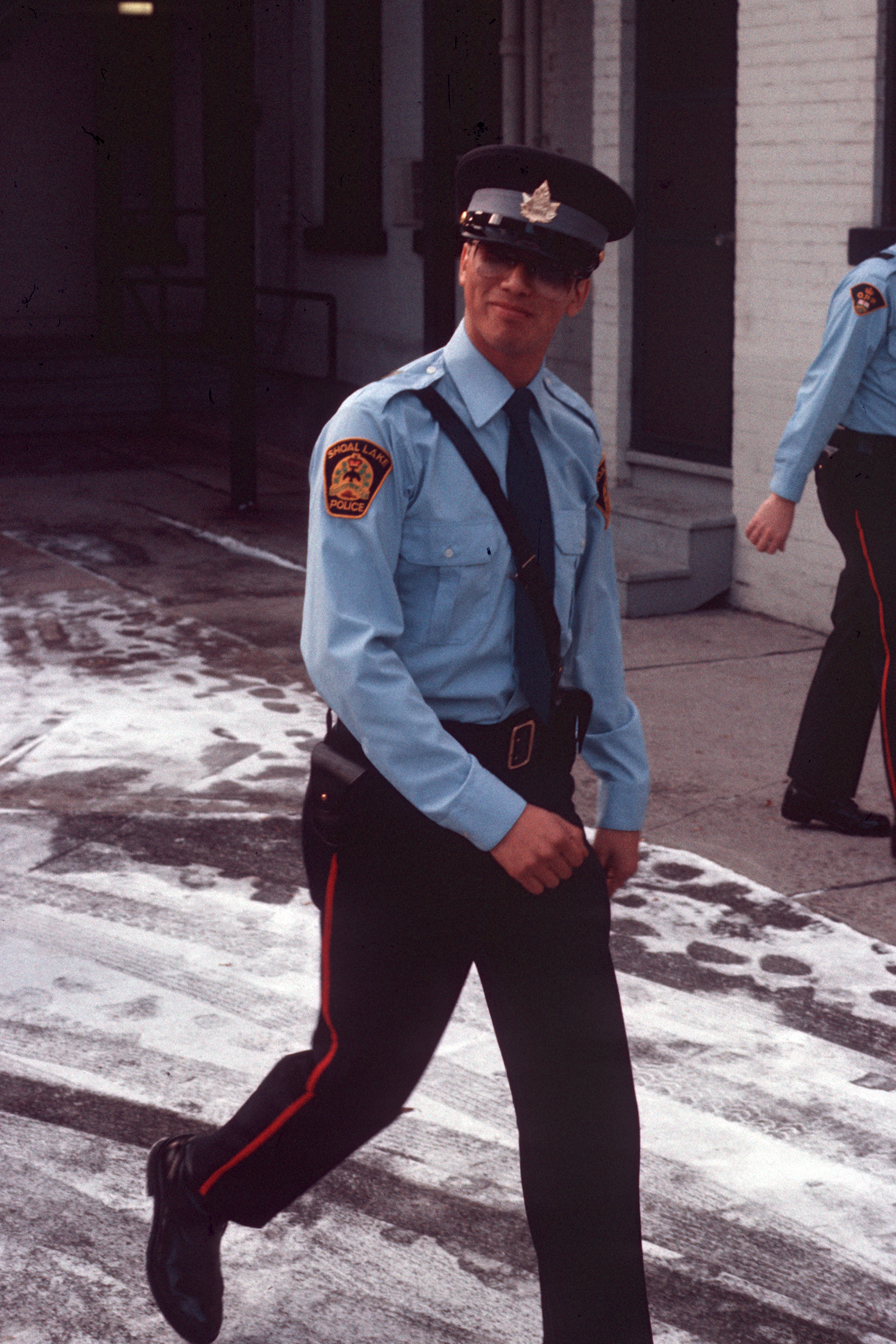
A First Nations constable employed by the Shoal Lake 40 First Nation Police, an OPP-administered First Nations police service. The Shoal Lake Police would later be amalgamated into the Treaty Three Police Service.

The policing of Indigenous communities in Canada has long been fraught with racial tension, inequitable police service delivery, and the enforcement of colonial laws and practices. Beginning in the 1960s, the federal government began to withdraw RCMP officers from reserves in the provinces of Ontario and Quebec in favour of provincial control over First Nations policing. Between 1990 and 1995, there were several high-profile conflicts between Indigenous protesters demanding the return of lands to which they had Aboriginal title and non-Indigenous police forces, resulting in the death of a police officer — Corporal Marcel Lemay of the Sûreté du Québec — and an unarmed Indigenous protester named Dudley George. During the 1995 Gustafsen Lake standoff, an RCMP commander reportedly told a subordinate to kill a prominent Indigenous demonstrator and "smear the prick and everyone with him," and an RCMP media liaison officer was quoted as saying that "smear campaigns are [the RCMP's] specialty."

The federal government created the First Nations and Inuit Policing Program in 1992, which scholars have called the first "comprehensive national policing strategy for [a country's] Aboriginal peoples." The Program was designed to allow First Nations and Inuit communities to create their own police forces that met the provincial standards for non-Indigenous police services, or establish their own RCMP detachment staffed by Indigenous officers, but has been criticized as underfunded and discriminatory by Indigenous groups, police chiefs, and the Canadian Human Rights Tribunal.

=== Police services ===
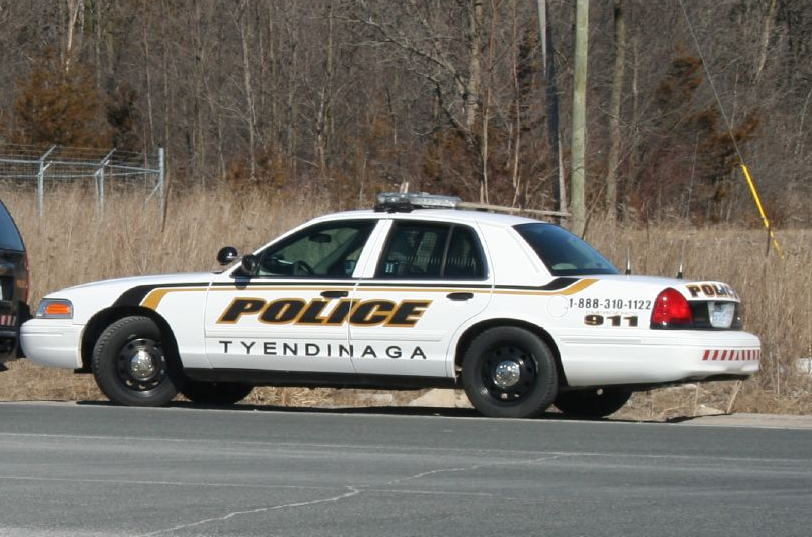
A Tyendinaga Police Service car.

In 2010, there were 38 self-administered First Nation police services in Canada, with one service each in British Columbia, Saskatchewan, and Manitoba; three services in Alberta; nine in Ontario; and 23 in Quebec, although that number had decreased to 22 by 2020. First Nations police services are required to meet different standards in each province. In British Columbia, First Nations police services are considered "designated policing units" and placed in the same category as the Metro Vancouver Transit Police. In Alberta, First Nations police services cannot maintain specialized resources, such as police dogs, and must consult with the RCMP before completing investigations into major crimes. In Quebec, however, First Nations police services have the "same missions, responsibilities, and powers [as non-Indigenous police forces] under Quebec police law." First Nations police services in Ontario are considered programs, not essential services, and are not required to meet standards under that province's Police Services Act unless police leadership decides to apply for an opt-in.

Many First Nations police services face serious funding shortfalls. In January 2006, two Indigenous men burned to death and an officer was seriously injured in a rescue attempt at a Nishnawbe-Aski Police Service detachment that the police force could not afford to bring into compliance with the fire code. (Two years later, the service had only one detachment that met provincial standards.) Other First Nations police services have struggled to pay for officers' wages and benefits or fill frontline positions because of budget shortfalls. In 2022, the Canadian Human Rights Tribunal found that the federal government, which unilaterally sets the budgets for First Nations police forces participating in the First Nations and Inuit Policing Program, engaged in discrimination when it failed to provide adequate funding to the Mashteuiatsh Innu Nation's police force.

In 2022, the British Columbia Special Committee on Reforming the Police Act unanimously recommended that the First Nations and Inuit Policing Program be replaced with a "new legislative and funding framework, consistent with international and domestic policing best practices and standards," and noted that "a truly decolonized lens would see Indigenous police services as an option for neighbouring municipalities or regions." Earlier that same year, the federal government began engaging First Nations about changes to the program and Indigenous police legislation.

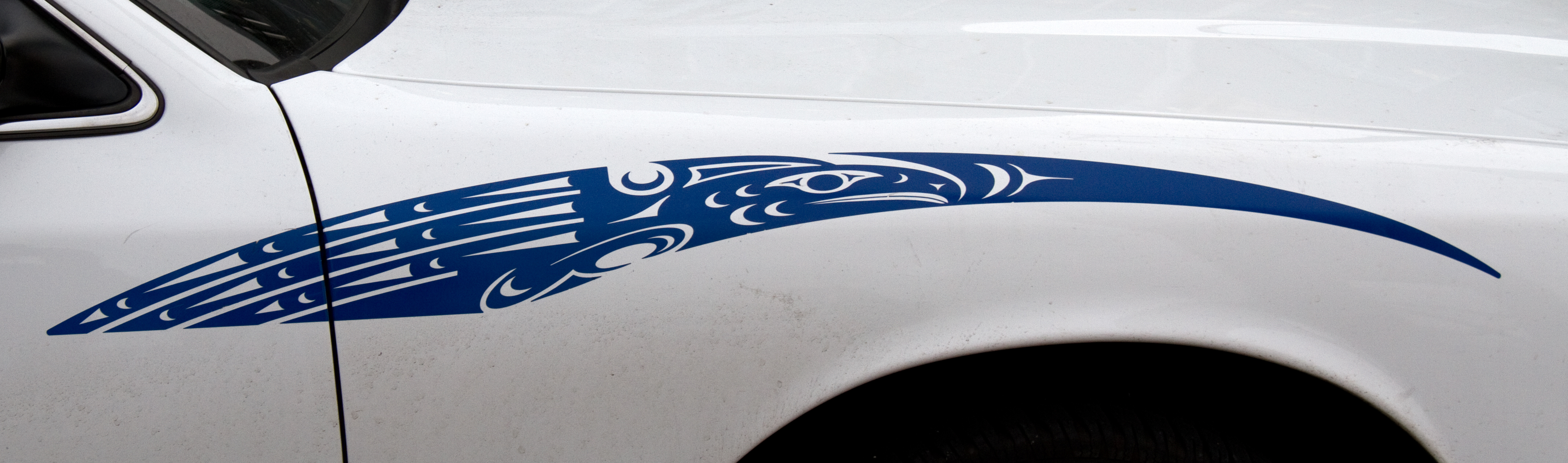
Indigenous art on the fender of a Vancouver police cruiser. The Vancouver Police Department, which provides police services to the Musqueam First Nation, is one of many non-Indigenous government services in British Columbia to have added First Nations art to buildings and vehicles in recent years.

=== Enforcement of Indigenous laws ===
Every form of Indigenous government has the power to enact and enforce by-laws. Métis settlements receive their authority from the Alberta Metis Settlements Act, and First and Inuit nations receive their authority either from the Indian Act or the relevant comprehensive land claim agreement. However, because the Indian Act does not specify whether by-law violations should be prosecuted in federal or provincial and territorial courts, some provincial courts will not prosecute Indigenous laws. The federal government ended a program that allowed Indigenous governments to appoint federal judges to enforce Indigenous laws in specialized courts in 2004, and as of 2022, few Indigenous governments exercise their powers to enact and enforce by-laws.

Several First Nations, such as the Asubpeeschoseewagong First Nation in northern Ontario, rely on police services to enforce by-laws, while others maintain dedicated by-law enforcement agencies. First Nations in Alberta, Saskatchewan, and Manitoba can maintain special constabularies for the enforcement of Indigenous and provincial legislation. Some First Nations police services, citing a lack of legitimacy or prosecutability, will not enforce Indigenous laws.

=== Community safety organizations ===
Several First Nations and Indigenous communities operate special constabularies or other law enforcement agencies with limited law enforcement powers, while others operate community safety agencies with no law enforcement powers. Although similar functions existed pre-colonization, the bulk of these organizations are an evolution of the band constable system introduced in the 1960s. Band constables were peace officers tasked with enforcing First Nation by-laws and assisting local police. The programme was terminated in 2015 and replaced by special constabularies in Alberta, Saskatchewan, and Manitoba, while in New Brunswick, the officers were replaced by locally hired civilian RCMP employees tasked with delivering crime prevention and community engagement programmes. The special constabularies have responsibility over enforcing provincial and First Nation legislation and are generally prohibited from conducting Criminal Code enforcement.

RCMP officers in Red Serge and Royal Newfoundland Constabulary officers marching during a Remembrance Day parade in St. John's, Newfoundland and Labrador.

Other First Nations maintain law enforcement divisions tasked exclusively with enforcing First Nation by-laws. These organizations typically have no authority to enforce provincial or federal legislation. The Musqueam First Nation in British Columbia maintains a Safety and Security Department, responsible for emergency management, community patrols, and "ensur[ing] compliance" with Musqueam by-laws. The Fort McKay First Nation in the Alberta oil sands maintains a Park Ranger Program — staffed by peace officers able to enforce First Nation by-laws but only report violations of provincial or federal law — to patrol the reserve's parks and wilderness and provide assistance and education to band members and visitors. The Fort McKay First Nation also maintains a special constabulary to provide general community safety services.

In Yukon and the Northwest Territories, First Nations can hire "community safety officers", who — unlike community safety officers in Saskatchewan — have no law enforcement or police powers and are instead tasked with patrolling communities, engaging with residents, and responding to emergencies. Many of these agencies are composed mostly or entirely of elders. Some First Nations in Saskatchewan operate "peacekeeper" programs, whose staff do not have law enforcement or police powers, to respond to non-violent calls for service, vehicle accidents, and fires. Similar programmes exist in Winnipeg, Manitoba, where volunteer organizations like the Bear Clan Patrol and the Mama Bear Clan conduct regular patrols of Indigenous neighbourhoods, liaise with Winnipeg Police to search for missing people, and deliver food to unhoused residents.

== Tiered policing ==
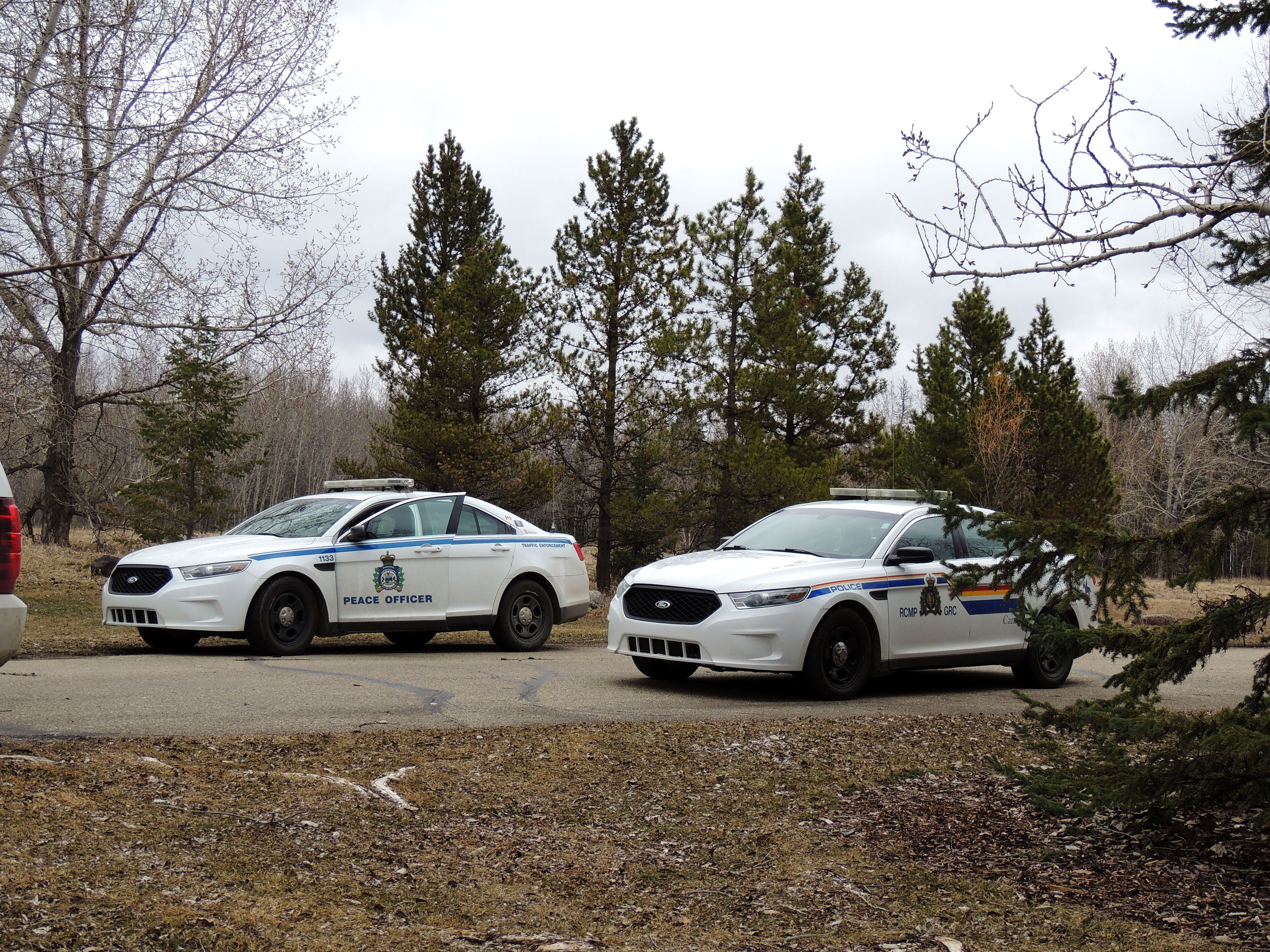
An example of tiered policing in Alberta: a municipal peace officer attending a call for service alongside an officer from a regional RCMP detachment.

Tiered policing is a model of specialization in police service delivery that involves hiring specially trained, non-police employees to assume responsibility over areas of a police service's traditional mandate. In contrast to a generalist police service, where sworn police officers with standardized training provide the bulk of police services — response to emergencies, investigation of crimes, community safety initiatives, and some clerical duties — and are augmented by a handful of non-police specialists in administrative roles; tiered police organizations employ a variety of staff with different training and expertise, as well as sworn police officers, who then specialize in various policing functions or components of those functions, including criminal investigations and frontline police service delivery. In Canada, the use of separate organizations to deliver certain frontline police services is also common, particularly in rural areas or in communities that do not maintain an independent police service. In these communities, independent special constabularies, civil law enforcement agencies, and community safety agencies are tasked with delivering basic frontline policing and community safety duties while police services respond to serious criminal violations. As of 2024, both forms of the model are common across Canada, and tiered policing is practiced in Yukon, the Northwest Territories, British Columbia, Alberta, Saskatchewan, Manitoba, Ontario, Quebec, New Brunswick, and Newfoundland and Labrador.

Literature and research into tiered policing has generally found that tiered delivery models are successful in increasing police efficacy and reducing the cost of policing, but that implementation efforts have been hampered by negative cultural perceptions within police services about non-police specialists and confusion over their role. Some non-police specialists have reported demeaning treatment or exclusion from workplace events, while others have highlighted under-utilization of their expertise or, conversely, expectations to participate in law enforcement activities they are neither trained nor authorized to participate in. Some police services have failed to provide meaningful career advancement or professional development opportunities to non-police staff, and have instead siloed their personnel management strategies between sworn police officers and non-police staff; or they have filled positions intended for non-police specialists with police officers who otherwise would need to be placed on leave for an injury or conduct investigation. Alternatively, police forces like the Royal Canadian Mounted Police have integrated police officers and non-police specialists directly alongside each other, recruiting non-police experts in computer science and accounting to join cyber and financial crime investigation teams. These investigators are fully integrated into the organization, given limited police authority, and are charged with interviewing witnesses and obtaining and executing search warrants, among other duties.

Non-police specialists fall into a variety of categories and are referred to by different titles depending on the individual employer and role. They include sworn special constables and peace officers providing a variety of frontline police services; forensic and crime scene investigators; criminal investigators; clerical administrators; volunteers; and media affairs specialists. Individual police services may refer to non-police specialists as "police staff," "civilian employees," or "professional staff." Special constables and other peace officers employed in enforcement and frontline policing roles operate under a variety of different designations depending on the individual police service and relevant provincial regulation: some police services categorize these officers as civilian or professional staff, while others categorize them as sworn employees in a category distinct from police officers.

=== Tiered police service delivery within a police service ===
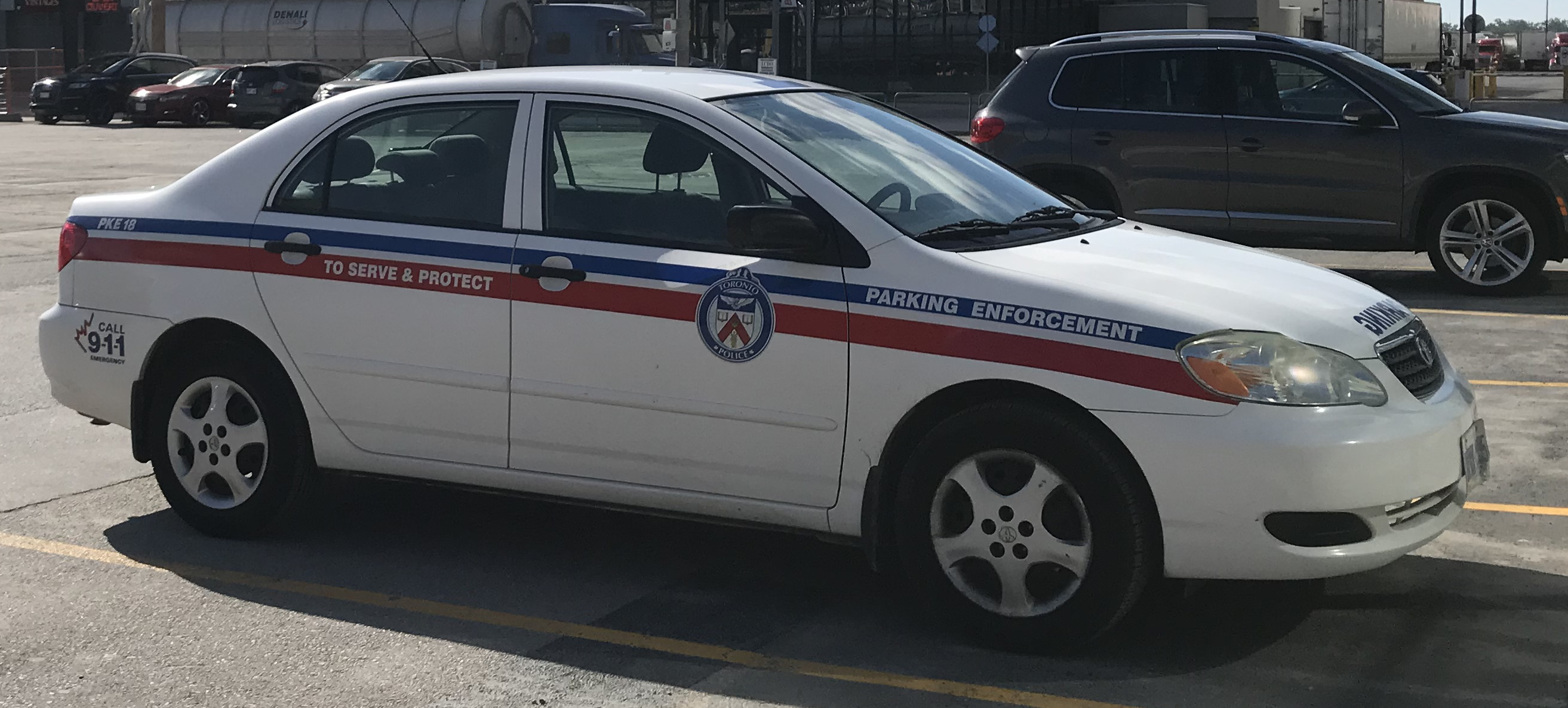
A Toronto Police Service car used by that police service's parking enforcement officers, who are specially-trained peace officers tasked with enforcing municipal by-laws.

The Winnipeg Police Service and Vancouver Police Department both employ special constables to guard crime scenes, respond to some non-violent calls for service, and direct traffic at emergencies. The Saskatoon Police Service employs special constables, referred to as "alternative response officers," to guard crime scenes, direct traffic at emergencies and events, and conduct foot patrols in high-crime areas. The File Hills First Nations Police Service employs special constables to fulfill almost all community policing duties in member reserves, manage police stations and police records, conduct traffic enforcement, and respond to some calls for service. Police services in Ontario have practiced tiered policing since the 1980s, when special constables first began to assume court protection and prisoner transport duties, but several police forces including the Brantford Police Service, Cobourg Police Service, and Toronto Police Service now deploy special constables and volunteer auxiliary constables in frontline policing roles. Since 2021, the Royal Canadian Mounted Police has employed Civilian Criminal Investigators, unarmed peace officers recruited from non-police fields, to assist with technical computer science or financial crimes.

=== Tiered policing through separate organizations ===
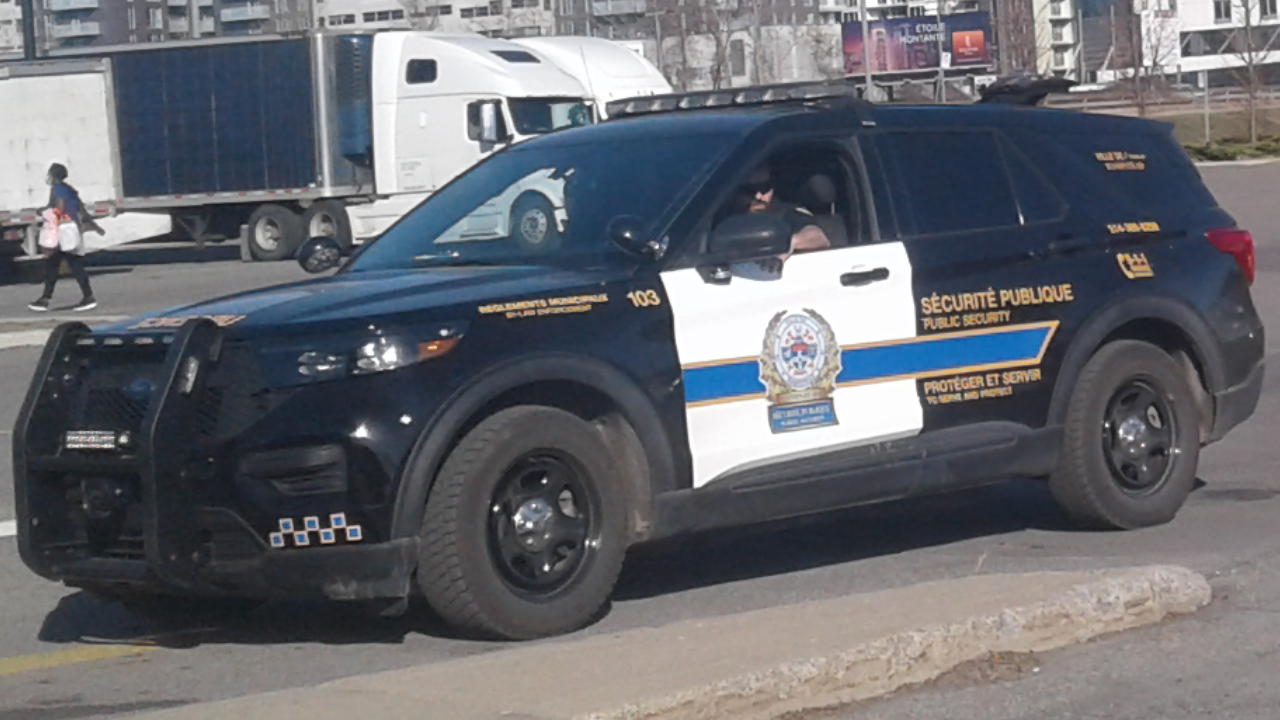
A Ford Police Interceptor Utility of the Hampstead, Quebec Public Security division, one of several similar organizations in the urban agglomeration of Montreal.

Most common in rural areas, first developed as an intentional framework in the 1980s in Alberta In all three territories, Alberta, Saskatchewan, the Urban agglomeration of Montreal, Newfoundland and Labrador, and parts of southern Ontario, tiered police service delivery includes separate special constabularies, which provide police services to municipalities served by regional or contracted police forces and to specific organizations, such as universities or transit systems.

==== Non-police mental health crisis response ====
In 2000, the Toronto Police Service partnered with local hospitals to create the Mobile Crisis Intervention Team, which pairs nurses with frontline police officers to respond to mental health crises. The program is only active in some parts of the City, and only during the afternoon and early evening, although it has gradually expanded since its introduction. Similar programs exist in parts of Ontario; parts of Metro Vancouver and Vancouver Island; Alberta and Saskatchewan, where they are operated by each province's respective provincial health authority; Winnipeg, Manitoba; Saint John, New Brunswick; the Halifax Regional Municipality; Newfoundland and Labrador; and some First Nations. Many of these services operate part-time, restrict their clientele to certain demographics (such as youths), and have only a few teams to cover a large area. There are no mobile mental health crisis response teams in Quebec or Canada's territories, although the Nunavut RCMP began talks with the Nunavut Justice Department in 2020 to implement a unit.

Following the death of Regis Korchinski-Paquet, the Toronto Police Service expanded its Mobile Crisis Intervention Team and began dispatching members of the team through 9-1-1 calls, rather than by back-up requests from other officers. The City of Toronto also launched a new crisis response team, the Community Crisis Service, in 2022. The service, which is composed entirely of unarmed, non-police specialists, operates 24 hours a day, six days a week.

== Organization ==
=== Governance ===
In every province except Quebec and Prince Edward Island, municipalities operating their own police service are required to establish a police commission, also referred to as a police board or police services board, to oversee local policing, prepare budgets, hire the chief of police, and legally employ every police officer at an arms length of the municipal council. These commissions have authority over the policies and procedures of the police service, and while they do not have control over operational matters (i.e. the number of police officers dispatched to a protest or a decision to charge an offender), they can offer advice about and oversee most policing operations.

=== Ranks ===
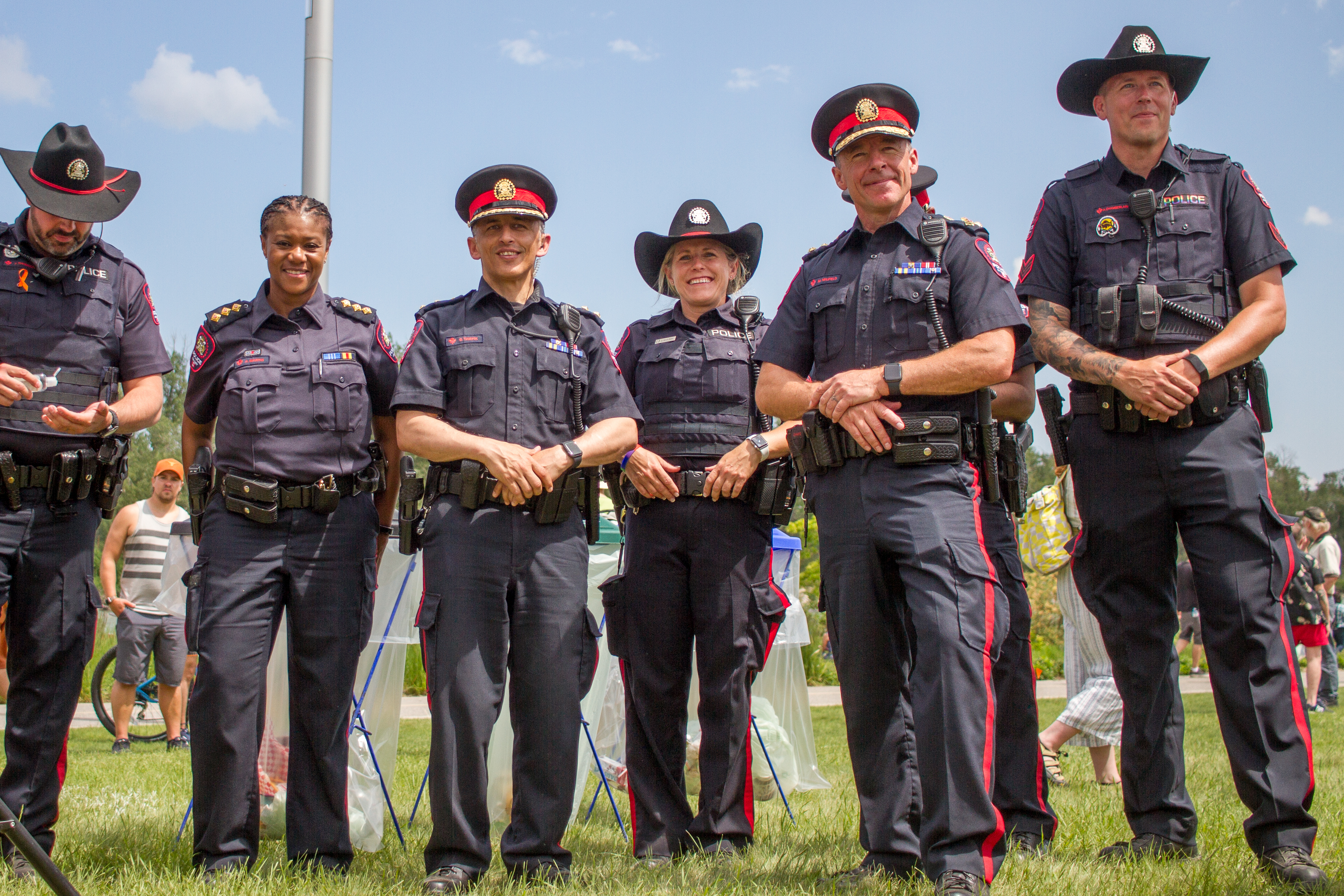
Members of the Calgary Police Service of various ranks. Note the insignia on the epaulettes.

Canadian police ranks are largely consistent with those used by British and Commonwealth police services. Uniquely, Canadian police services use the title "staff" in place of "chief" for certain ranks, such as staff sergeant or staff inspector. Chief of Police is the title of the head of most Canadian police forces, except in British Columbia (where police executives are called Chief Constable or Chief Officer) and Quebec (where police executives are called Directors). In most provinces, police ranks and insignia are regulated by the solicitor general. The Royal Canadian Mounted Police and Ontario Provincial Police both use the title "Commissioner." Special constabularies typically use the same rank structure as police services, while civil law enforcement agencies usually use role-based rank titles, opting for ranks like "supervisor" instead of "sergeant."

== Equipment ==
=== Weapons ===
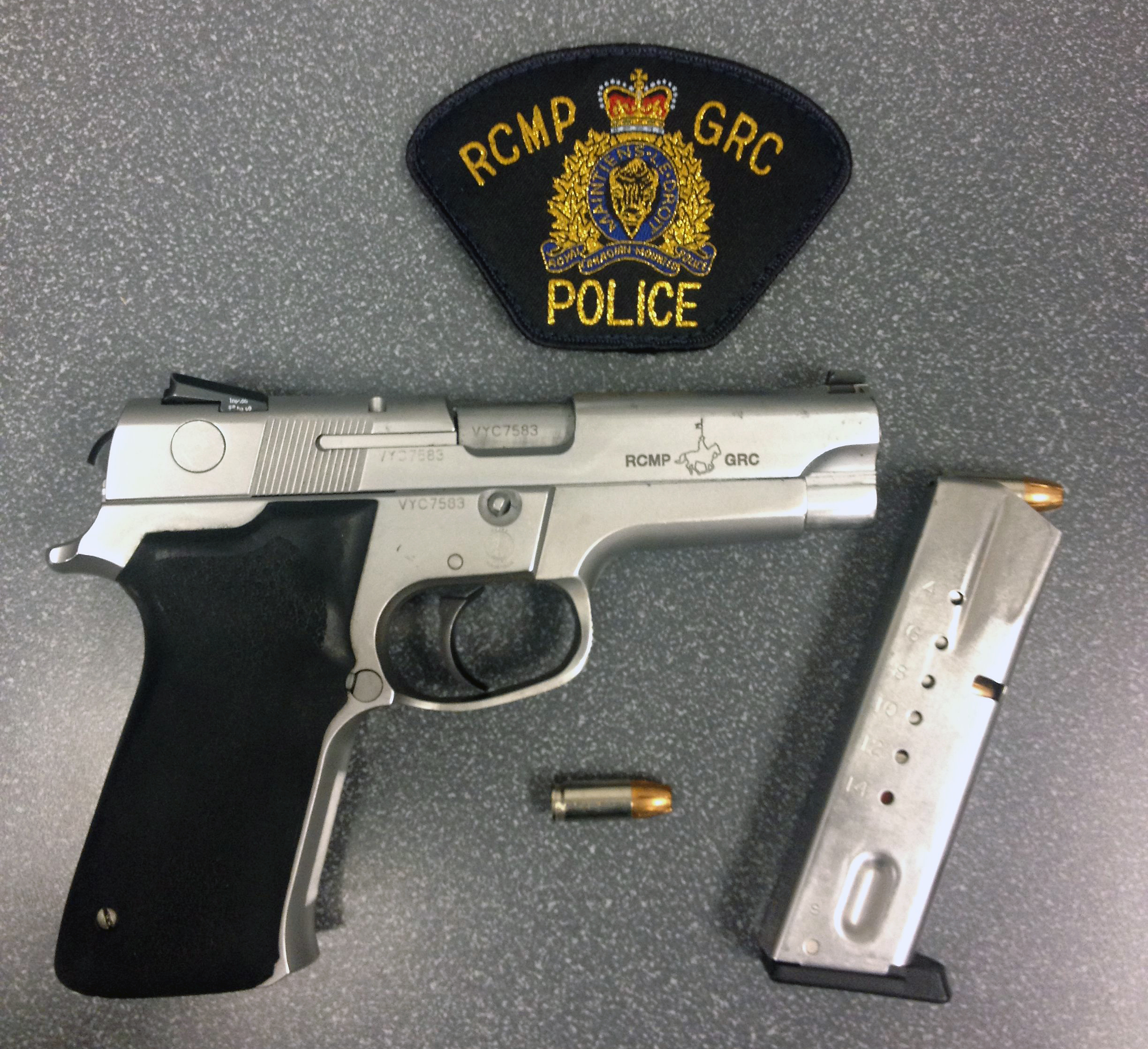
A standard issue Smith & Wesson 5946 semi-automatic pistol is the primary side-arm of choice for the RCMP.

Frontline police officers in Canada are usually equipped with semi-automatic 9mm calibre handguns. Some special constables, most notably those employed by the Niagara Parks Police Service; federal park wardens; and conservation officers also carry handguns. Most police cruisers are equipped with carbine rifles and other long guns designed to fire less-lethal ammunition. Police officers and special constables are also usually equipped with collapsible batons and pepper spray.

Police services have equipped officers with Tasers as early as 2001, but their use has been controversial. In one 2021 incident, a judge stayed all charges against a man who was repeatedly tasered by an Edmonton police officer after a brief foot chase, finding that the officer had tasered him "out of frustration" and violated their police force's Taser policies. In 2007, RCMP officers killed Robert Dziekański, a Polish citizen, with a Taser at the Vancouver International Airport. The incident prompted the Toronto Police Service and Royal Newfoundland Constabulary to put orders for Tasers on hold. (Both forces eventually acquired Tasers.) Taser deployments, and particularly their use against people experiencing mental health crises, continued to attract public scrutiny as of 2022.

=== Body-worn cameras ===
Compared to American police forces, Canadian police and law enforcement agencies have been slow to adopt body-worn cameras. The first police force to acquire body-worn cameras on a permanent basis was the single-officer police service in the Rural Municipality of Cornwallis, Manitoba, in 2016. In the wake of protests following the murder of George Floyd in the U.S, body-worn cameras were adopted by several Canadian police forces, including the Toronto Police Service, Cobourg Police Service, Kentville Police Service, and Saint John Police Force. The RCMP planned to roll body-worn cameras out starting in late 2021, but had not yet awarded a contract for supplying the cameras as of November of that year. However, as of May 2023, the RCMP is starting to roll out body-worn cameras to some detachments

Some special constabularies, such as the Saskatchewan Highway Patrol, also use body-worn cameras. The Happy Valley-Goose Bay Municipal Enforcement Department, a special constabulary in Newfoundland and Labrador, equipped its officers with body-worn cameras briefly in 2021 before the province's privacy commissioner recommended that the Town stop the program because of concerns that video footage was not adequately protected.

=== Uniforms ===
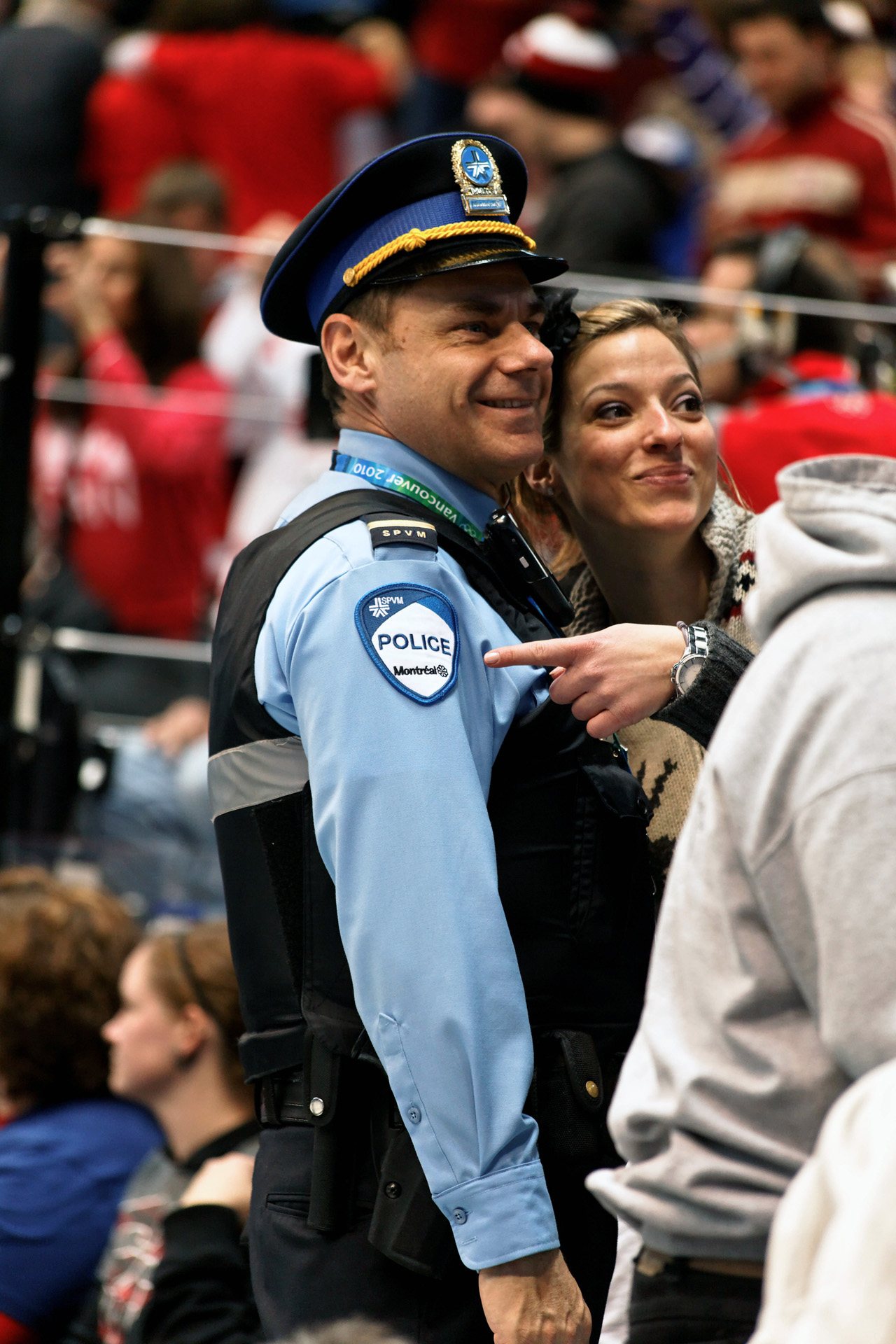
A Service de police de la Ville de Montréal wearing an older baby blue dress shirt during the 2010 Winter Olympics in Vancouver

Each law enforcement agency in Canada has its own uniform and identity, which must meet provincial or territorial regulations that ensure some consistency between different agencies. Although these regulations vary between jurisdictions, there are regional similarities in the Prairies and Atlantic Canada. Nationwide, almost every public safety and law enforcement agency equips their members with bulletproof vests, usually worn over the uniform shirt and with title boards (such as "Community Safety Officer" or "Police") that identify their legal status.

In Alberta, Saskatchewan, Manitoba, and Ontario, and New Brunswick, municipal police officers are required by provincial regulation to wear navy blue dress shirts and navy blue trousers ornamented with red trouser piping. In British Columbia, Prince Edward Island, and Nova Scotia, municipal police officers generally wear royal blue trouser piping instead of red. Blue trouser piping is required by regulation in British Columbia, but in practice, this is rarely implemented. In Quebec, police officers are not required to wear trouser piping.

In British Columbia, Newfoundland and Labrador, and the territories, municipal peace officers generally wear navy blue dress shirts and navy blue trousers with red trouser piping. In Alberta, peace officers and special constables are generally required to wear light grey shirts and navy blue trousers with matching light grey trouser piping. In every other province, there are no consistent regulations for special constables and peace officers except that their uniforms be clearly distinct from those worn by police officers.

Prior to the widespread use of special constables and peace officers in frontline policing roles, public safety and law enforcement officers had generally similar uniforms regardless of their legal status. In the Canadian Prairies, police and peace officers typically wore light grey shirts. The Royal Canadian Mounted Police is the only police service in Canada that still uses light grey dress shirts for frontline police officers, although Parks Canada Park Wardens also wear grey dress shirts with dark green trousers. In most other provinces, police officers typically wore light blue shirts. The adoption of navy blue shirts began in the 1990s and was primarily driven by a desire to make uniforms more professional, as police executives felt that lighter colours showed dirt and sweat too readily.

Historically, police and peace officers in Canada wore their badges on their caps and were generally required to wear their forage caps at all times. In British Columbia, Alberta, and Quebec, this requirement no longer exists, although some police services still require that frontline police officers wear some form of headgear. Beginning in the mid-2010s, an increasing share of police forces in Ontario have allowed frontline officers to wear ballcaps instead of forage caps.

=== Vehicles ===
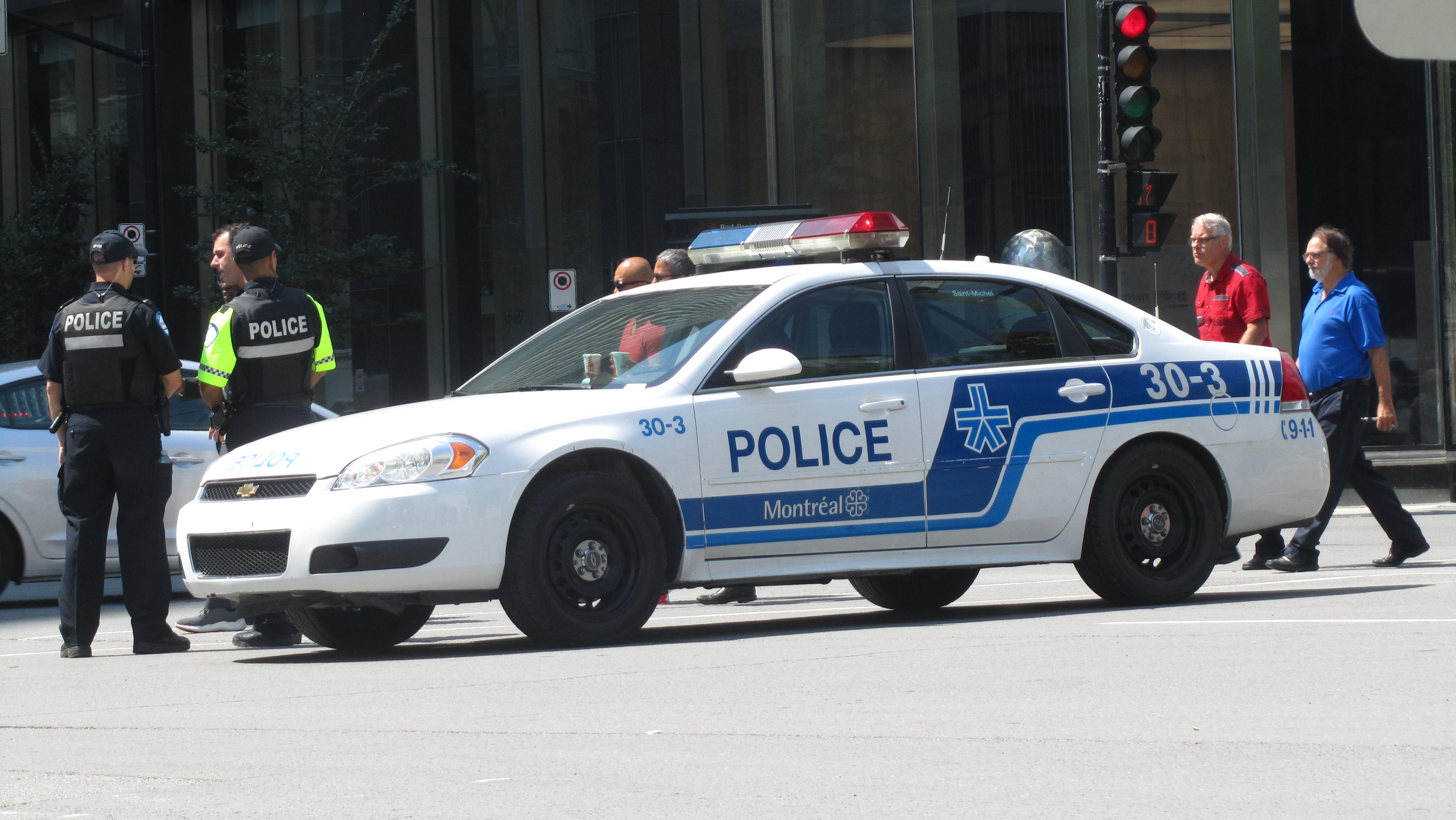
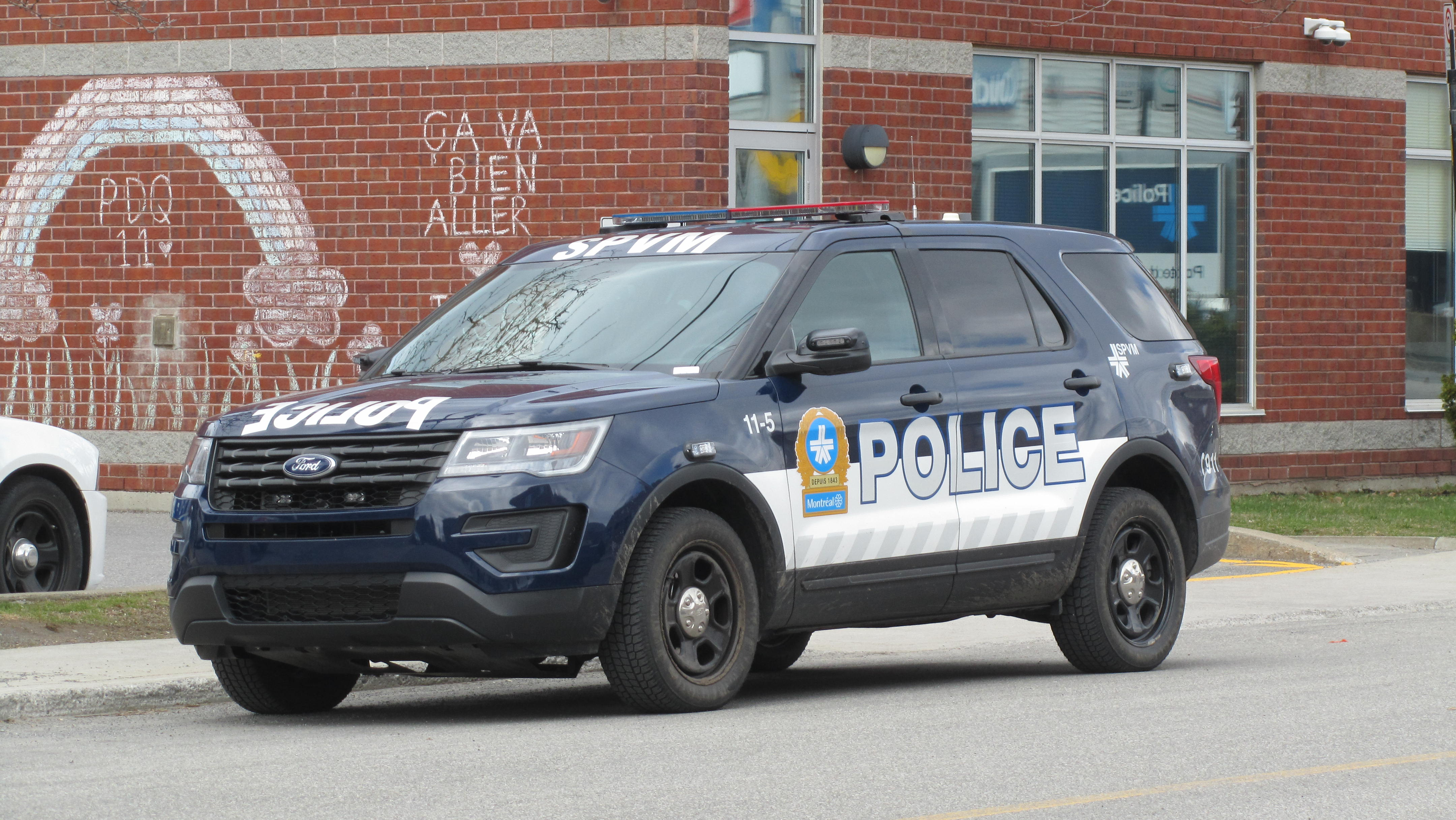
Two Service de police de la Ville de Montréal vehicles. The white design (left), was used in the 2010s, while the navy blue design (right) was introduced in 2018.

As part of their authority to establish, maintain, and regulate law enforcement agencies, some provinces regulate the models of vehicle that can be used by police services for frontline policing. In the late 2010s and early 2020s, many Canadian police services began ordering vehicles painted grey, navy blue, or black to replace white- and silver-coloured cruisers, sparking controversy about their accessibility to the public and visibility in low-light conditions. In every province and territory, police services are entitled to use red and blue lights on marked and unmarked emergency vehicles.

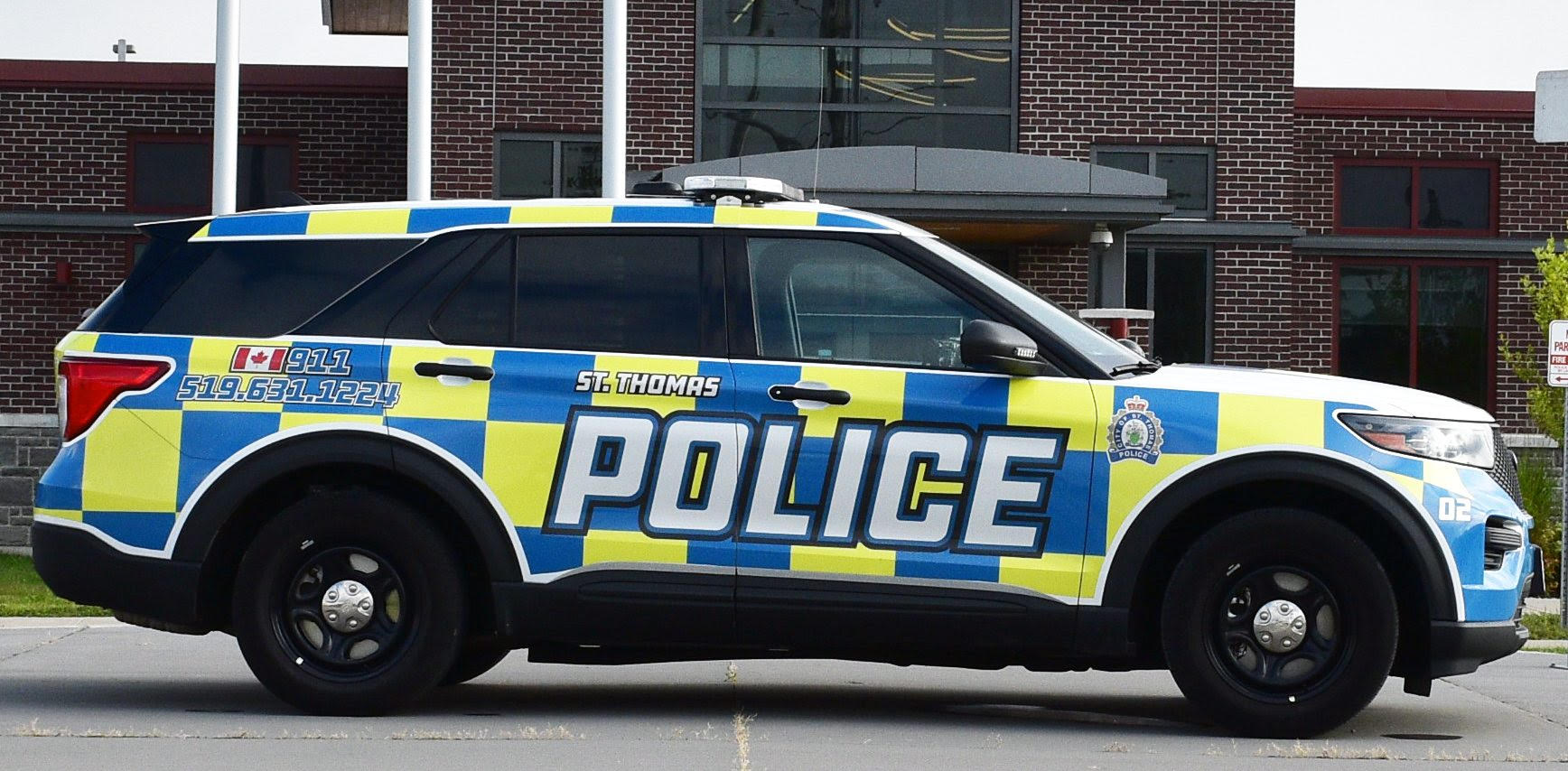
A St. Thomas Police Service cruiser trialling Battenburg markings in 2022.

In the early 2020s, some police services in Ontario began to pilot Battenburg markings. As of 2025, the Barrie Police Service has adopted the high visibility markings for its entire fleet, while the police forces in London and Brantford have adopted the markings for vehicles used by special constables.

Most special constabularies use fleets of marked police-model vehicles, and many are painted in colours that reflect the larger corporate branding scheme of their parent organization. In Alberta and Saskatchewan, vehicles maintained by special constabularies must have two blue reflective stripes, the organization's logo, and text that reads "Peace Officer" (in Alberta) or "Community Safety Officer" (in Saskatchewan) on the bottom of the passenger doors. In Quebec, special constabularies are restricted to using red emergency lights exclusively, and in Ontario, special constables can only use emergency lights or sirens if authorized by the relevant police services board. In every other province and in all three territories, including Alberta and Saskatchewan, special constabularies can use red and blue lights.

Only some civil law enforcement agencies operate marked vehicles, and the exact markings vary significantly based on the role and nature of the agency. Some agencies, which are operated by police services, use vehicles that are painted in variations of the larger police force's livery, while others operated directly by municipalities or provinces may use vehicles from the larger motor pool, marked only with the parent organization's logo. In British Columbia, by-law enforcement officers are authorized to use red lights, and in Ontario, civil law enforcement officers enforcing emissions or commercial vehicle regulations may use red and blue lights and sirens. In every province and territory, civil law enforcement officers employed by conservation officer or commercial vehicle enforcement services can use red and blue lights. Civil law enforcement officers are otherwise restricted to amber lights.

== See also ==
- Canadian Association of Police Governance
- Crime in Canada
- Indigenous police in Canada
- International Criminal Police Organization (Interpol)
- Law enforcement by country
- List of law enforcement agencies
- List of law enforcement agencies in Canada
- List of countries by size of police forces
- Missing and murdered Indigenous women and girls (MMIWG)
- Terrorism in Canada
