= Canadian Association of Police Governance =

The Canadian Association of Police Governance, formerly the Canadian Association of Police Boards, works to improve police governance in Canada and attempt to enhance public safety for all Canadians. CAPG is a Canadian civil society organization representing the interests of civilian governance of municipal police services, and providing services for their members.

== Members ==
In Canada, oversight of the police services typically falls to a civilian body composed of members of municipal councils and sometimes complemented by citizens of the municipality appointed by either the province or municipality. A subset of these police services boards maintain paid membership with CAPG. Provincial and federal governments, educational institutions, and other relevant NGOs may obtain membership as well. The association counted 75 members in 2016.

In 2020, news featured the difficulty in running police services boards, where CAPG was cited as having many police boards without the requisite budget funding to join, leaving them without access to resources that CAPG provides to paying members.

== Functions ==
The association claims many functions within its role, primarily knowledge sharing, deliberation, advocacy, and research on reform.

Its function in advancing research can be found on its website, and include surveys. It has also participated in research, with a CAPG representative writing a report for the government on civilian perspectives of police governance.

Most notably among its work was work in the late 1990's on creation of a report detailing recommended reforms for police services boards across Canada, issues it contends were not resolved by 2005.

Its connecting function caught media attention in 2013, where its theme of policing and mental health for its national conference was commended by another NGO, and received coverage by Global News.

In 2018, the national conference discussed sexual violence complaints, including the issue of women not feeling like they will be believed if they come forward with complaints. This discussion led to media coverage on the adoption of the Philadelphia model, a method by which police departments are required to share records of investigatory processes with external partners to identify trends that lead to ineffective investigation or other problems.
