= Special constable =

Auxiliary or specialised law enforcement officer

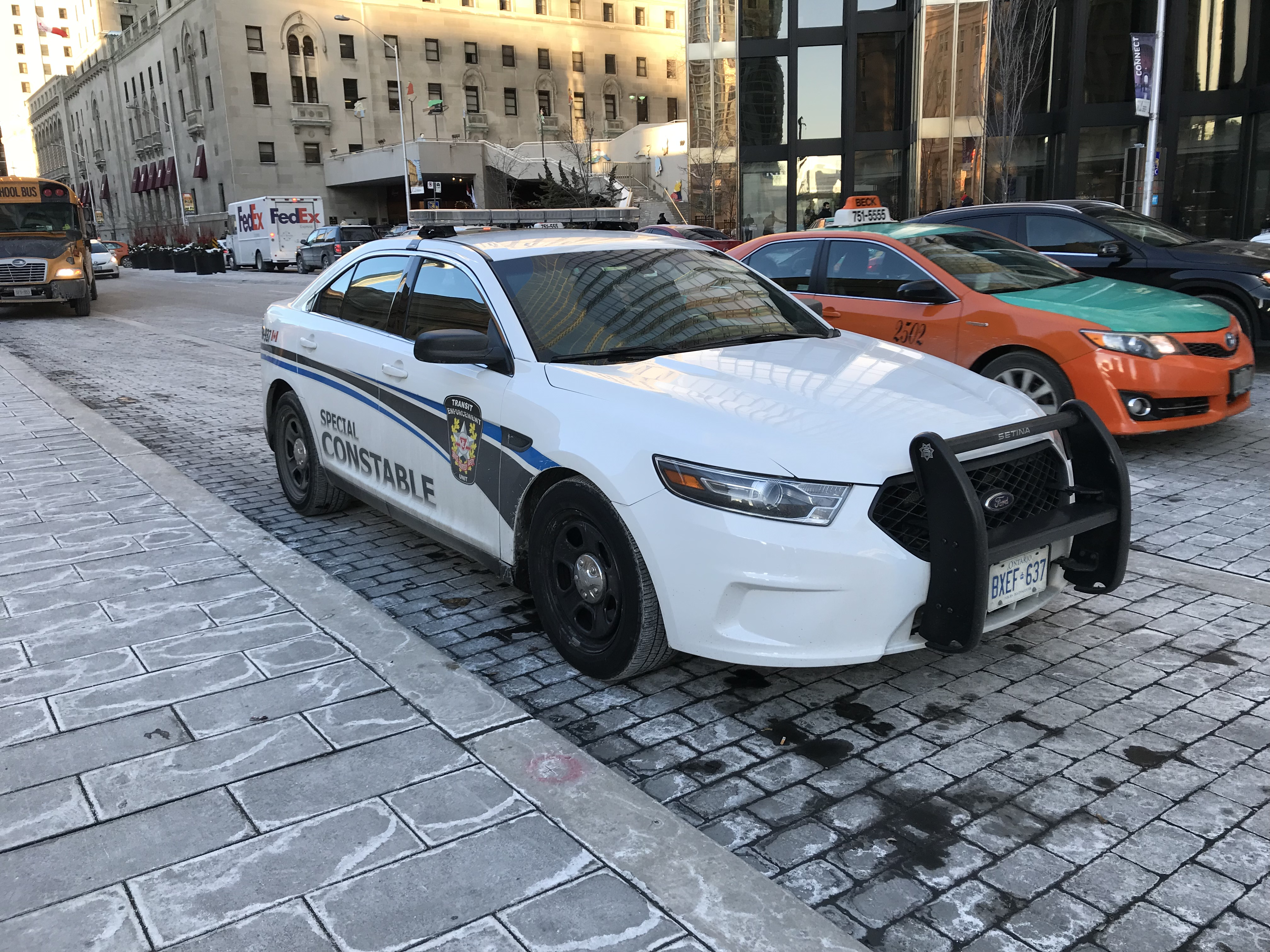
A patrol car of the Toronto Transit Commission's Transit Enforcement Unit, a special constabulary responsible for transit policing

A special constable (SC) or special police constable (SPC) can refer either to an auxiliary or part-time law enforcement officer; or a person who is granted certain (special) police powers.

In some jurisdictions, police forces are complemented by a special constabulary, whose volunteer members have full police powers and hold the office of constable. In other jurisdictions, specifically Canada and parts of Australia, special constables are sworn peace officers granted police powers to enforce specific legislation in a distinct context or geographic area (e.g. universities, public transit, parks, etc.). Historically, and in different contexts, special constables have been paid or volunteer members of an ad-hoc reserve force or a permanent auxiliary, and have ranged from unarmed patrols to armed paramilitaries.

== Australia ==
=== New South Wales ===
In the Australian state of New South Wales, special constables can now only be appointed by the NSW Police Commissioner. Previously, to augment the NSW Police but also to protect the community against abuse or neglect by the NSW Police, Special Constables could be appointed by a magistrate or two justices where "tumult, riot, or serious indictable offence has taken place, or may be reasonably apprehended" and the magistrate or justices believe that "the ordinary constables or officers appointed for preserving the peace are not sufficient for the preservation of the peace, and for the protection of the inhabitants and the security of their property, or for the apprehension of offenders". Special constables were appointed under the Police (Special Provisions) Act 1901 and had the same powers as constables of the NSW Police.

- Inspectors of the Royal Society for the Prevention of Cruelty to Animals may be appointed as special constables.
- Officers of local government councils, Transport for NSW and NSW Health responsible for health and building inspections, vehicle parking, railway laws and to prevent disorder in certain circumstances may be appointed as special constables.
- NSW Police employs special constables as an armed internal security force. This special internal unit provides protective services to government departments such as the Premier's Office, the Independent Commission Against Corruption (ICAC), the Governor of New South Wales and the Director of Public Prosecutions (DPP). They also protect covert police locations and have a mobile rapid deployment team (MIST – Major Incident Security Team) with advanced firearms and defensive tactics training, for special assignments.
- Members of police bands are also appointed as special constables.

=== South Australia ===
In South Australia, community constables are recruited by South Australia Police to serve the Indigenous Australian communities. Working alongside police officers, the Aboriginal Australian or Torres Strait Islander community constable help to run a wide range of programs.

=== Other ===
State police stationed near their state borders are sometimes assigned the status of special constable in the neighbouring state to allow hot pursuit of offenders across state borders and lawful arrest on the other side.

== Canada ==
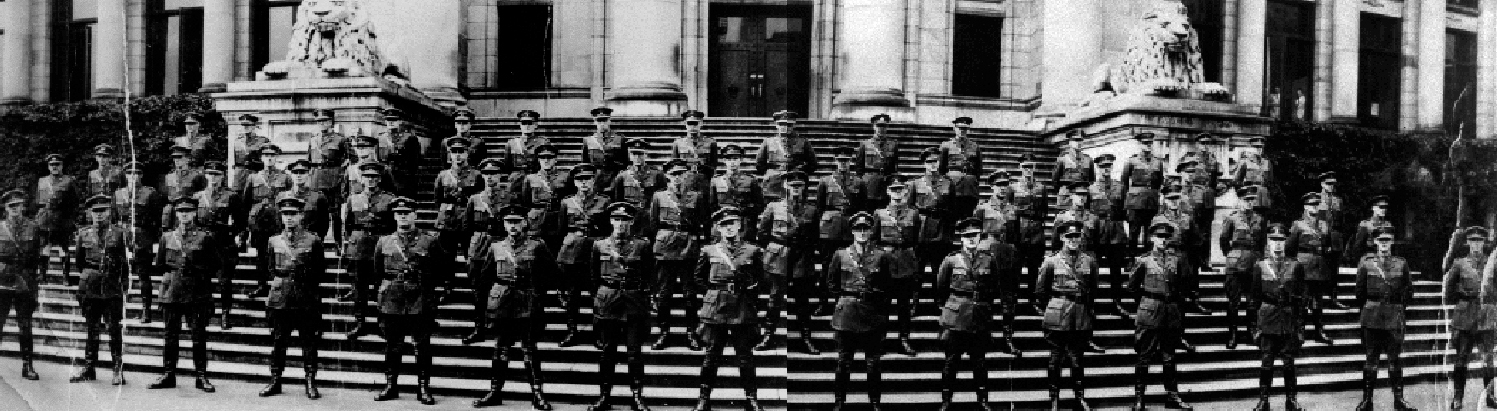
Special constables of the British Columbia Provincial Police during the 1935 waterfront strike.

In Canada, a special constable is a sworn peace officer granted police powers to enforce specific legislation or provide police services to a distinct context or geographic area. They are generally unarmed, and while some special constables possess full police powers while on duty, others have extremely limited authority. Special constables can be employed by universities, government corporations like transit commissions and bridge authorities, police forces, municipalities, First Nations, and humane societies.

Historically, special constables in Canada were used on an ad-hoc basis to serve summons, provide paid temporary augmentation to a police force, or provide specialized security police services. During the Winnipeg General Strike, Winnipeg police officers refused to sign an anti-union pledge and were promptly dismissed, replaced with special constables with the express mission of ending the strike.

Although special constables are increasingly used for routine frontline policing in every province and territory, the regulatory framework for special constables across Canada has generally continued to assume that special constables are used for rare and unusual circumstances. In most of Canada, for example, special constables generally do not need to unilaterally meet the stringent training and service standards that police services do, and outside of Alberta and Manitoba, the regulation of special constabularies and other special constable employers is undertaken on a case-by-case basis by either the provincial government or regional police commissions.

In Alberta, special constables are referred to as peace officers and must meet unilateral regulations similar to those of police services. Although community peace officers in Alberta can be employed by a range of organizations, their powers, appearance, and training are the same provincewide, regardless of their employer or specific mandate.

Volunteers with provincial and municipal police services in Canada are called reserve or auxiliary constables.

=== Federal ===
Special constables employed by the federal government are usually granted limited police powers for the purposes of civil law enforcement, such as investigators for the Competition Bureau and Transport Canada.

Starting in 2016, the Royal Canadian Mounted Police (RCMP) began to hire "community constables," who are armed special constables responsible for carrying out a variety of policing activities in their home community, with an emphasis on crime reduction and prevention through patrols or visits to schools and workplaces. Special constables were also historically employed by the Royal Canadian Mounted Police as interpreters, guides, and aides in Indigenous communities in northern Canada.

Federal police officers or federally-authorized police officers (such as railway police officers) are sometimes cross-appointed as special constables, in addition to their appointment as federal police officers, enabling them to enforce provincial legislation.

=== Alberta ===
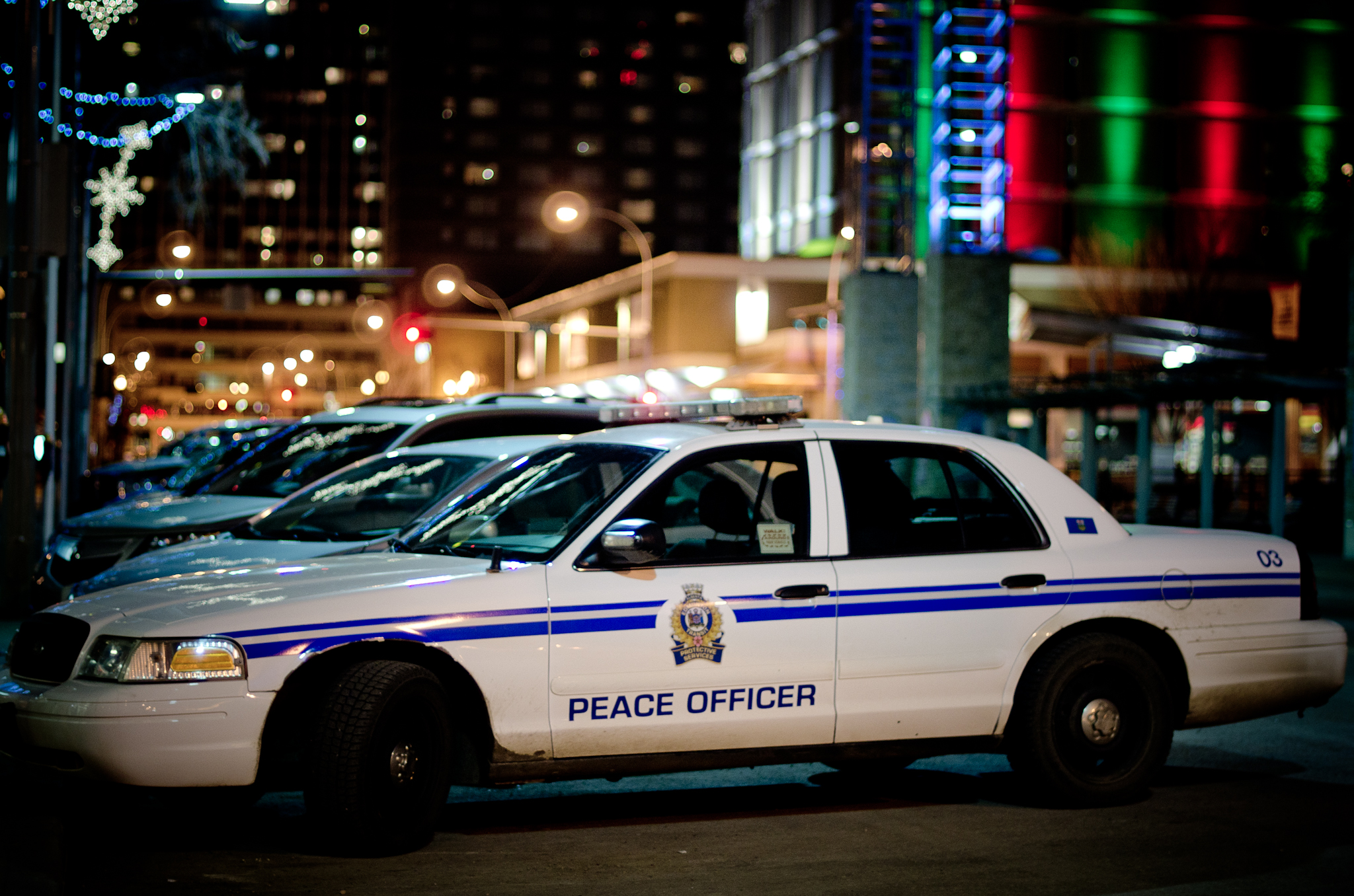
Vehicles used by the Edmonton Transit Service's Protective Services Division, whose members are peace officers.

Special constables in Alberta are referred to as peace officers.

Peace officers are used extensively in Alberta as part of the province's tiered approach to police service delivery. Municipalities can employ community peace officers — who can enforce provincial regulations (such as traffic offences), respond to calls for emergency service, and receive use-of-force equipment and training — or municipal compliance officers, who are limited to the reactive enforcement of municipal or corporate by-laws and generally do not receive use-of-force equipment or training. Universities, transit systems, First Nations, and private animal protection agencies can also employ community peace officers.

Peace officers also compose the Alberta Sheriffs Branch, which is responsible for legislative and courtroom security, prisoner transport, highway safety, wildlife and conservation enforcement, and some criminal investigations. Officers of the Branch have full police powers, including the ability to enforce the Criminal Code, and carry firearms.

=== British Columbia ===
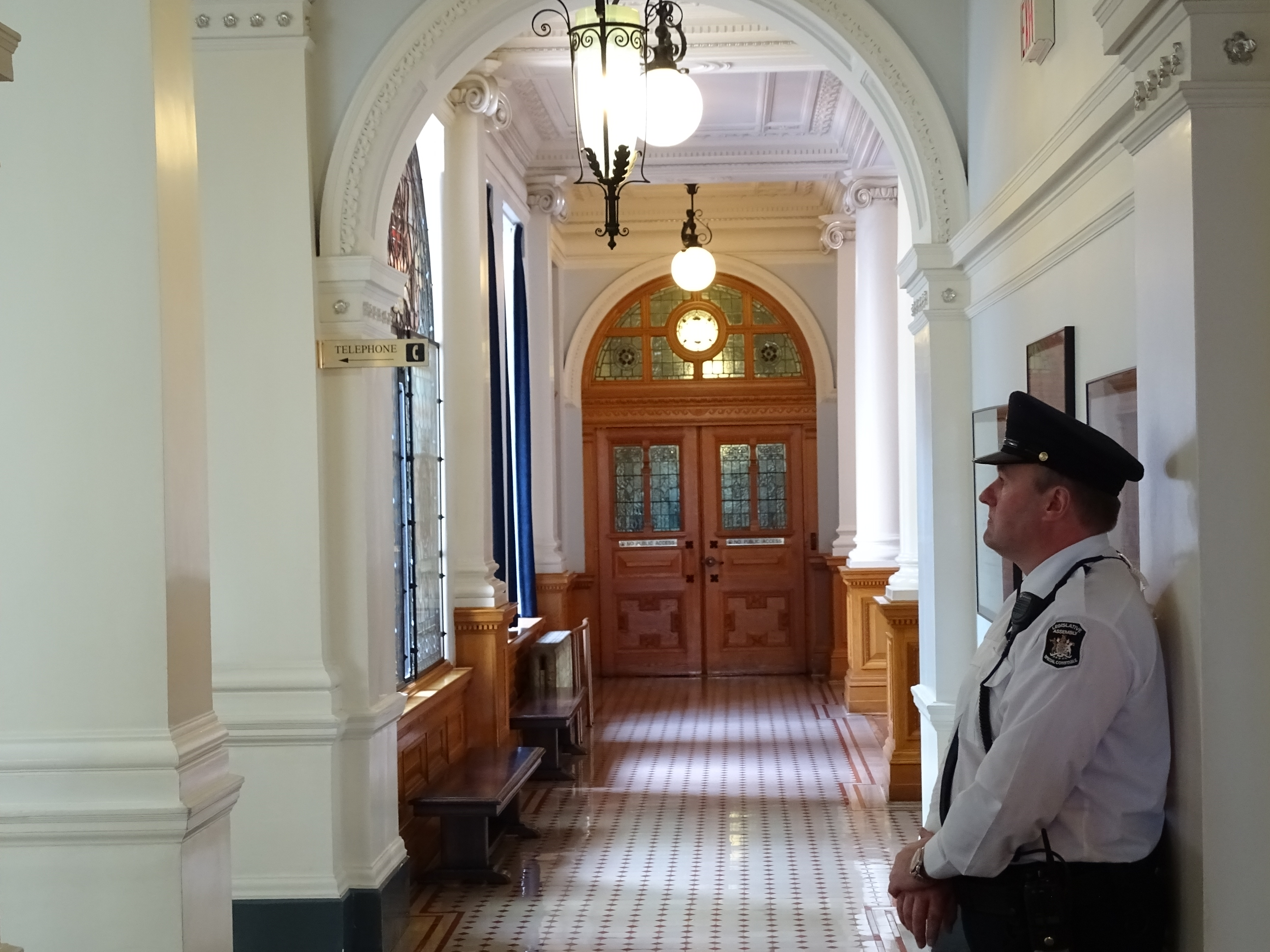
A British Columbia Legislative Assembly Special Constable in uniform.

In the province of British Columbia, members of the Commercial Vehicle Safety and Enforcement Service, Conservation Officer Service, Legislative Security Service, and Sheriff Service are appointed as special constables under the province's Police Act, and are responsible for enforcing specific provincial and federal laws, including certain Criminal Code offences.

Some municipal police forces also employ special constables as part of a tiered police service delivery model. These special constables are typically used for traffic control, crime scene management, and low-risk emergency call response.

In 2014, the Independent Investigations Office, which is responsible for investigating incidents involving police and peace officers that result in serious injury or death, entered into a memorandum of understanding with all of the agencies which use special constables across British Columbia on the scope and proceedings of IIO investigations and the IIO's access to special constabulary records, formalizing the ability of the Office to investigate special constables and special constabularies. (Note: In most other provinces and territories, special constables are investigated by local police services or their employers, not independent bodies.)

=== Quebec ===
In Quebec, special constables are peace officers. Their mission is to maintain peace, order and public security, to prevent and repress crime and, according to the jurisdiction specified in their deeds of appointment, to enforce the law and municipal by-laws, and to apprehend offenders. Special Constables employed by the Ministry of public safety have full police powers and are armed.

=== Ontario ===
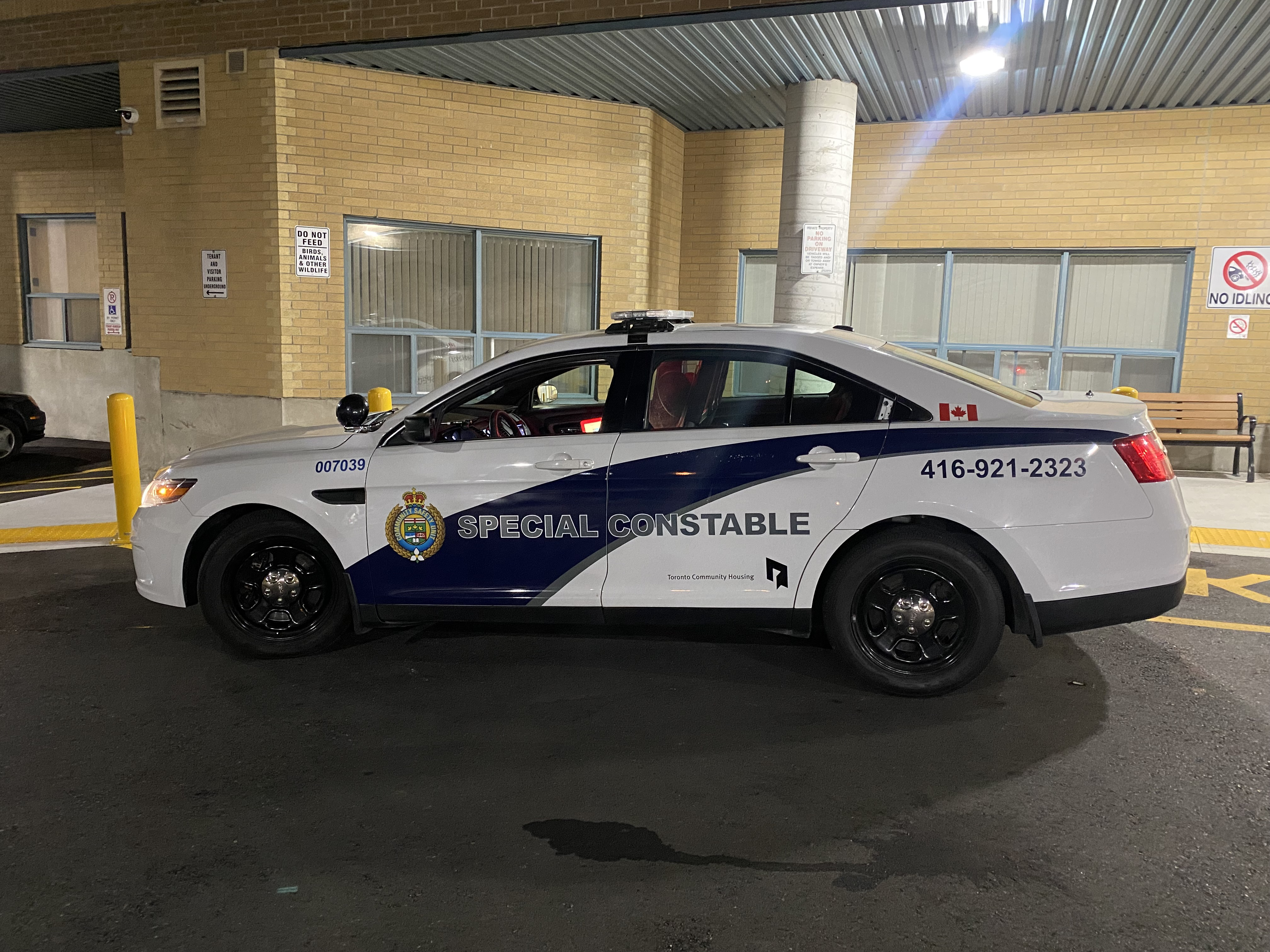
Service vehicle for the Toronto Community Housing's Community Safety Unit, a special constabulary authorized by the Toronto Police Services Board.

In Ontario, special constables generally have full police powers and can be employed by police services, which are maintained by municipalities, or special constabularies, which can be maintained by transit agencies, public housing corporations, parks authorities, and universities.

Special constables employed by police forces are generally tasked with courtroom security, offender transportation, and overseeing holding cells, but since the late 2010s, an increasing number of Ontario police services employ special constables in frontline policing roles. The municipal police force in Brantford, Ontario employs special constables to provide foot patrols in the city's downtown core, while the police service in Cobourg has used special constables for beach patrols, downtown patrols, traffic collision investigations, and other duties since 2018. Other police forces use special constables to investigate traffic collisions, collect evidence, or manage emergency or crime scenes.

In addition to police services, any organization can request authorization from a local police services board — a commission governing police and law enforcement services for each local or regional municipality in the province — to raise a special constabulary for the purposes of providing police services on or in relation to the authorized organization's land or mandate. Organizations which operate across the jurisdictions of several independent police services boards, such as GO Transit, usually receive special constabulary authorization directly from the provincial government. Other organizations, such as the University of Toronto, which maintains three semi-independent campuses across the jurisdiction of two separate police services boards, receive authorization from each individual police services board.

Since 2018, special constabularies in the province have been prohibited from referring to themselves as police services, with the exception of the Niagara Parks Police Service, an armed special constabulary of the Niagara Parks Commission. Previously, special constabularies maintained by universities were usually referred to as campus or community police.

== Hong Kong ==
Hong Kong Police Force and the Hong Kong Auxiliary Police Force are the only two police forces in Hong Kong during peacetime. However, the Chief Executive of Hong Kong can, pursuant to Hong Kong Laws Chapter 245 (Public Order Ordinance), section 40, appoint Special Constables at any time, who will possess any powers given to regular police officers and are subject to the same Code of Conduct.

However, under section 41 (subsection 3) of the same ordinance, Special Constables are not entitled to pay, benefits, or pensions.

== Ireland ==
The Garda Síochána Reserve is the reserve section of the Garda Síochána – the police force of the Republic of Ireland. It was created in 2006 to supplement the work of the permanent Garda force, and assist in performing its functions. A Garda reserve has most of the powers of a permanent Garda, but must be accompanied by a permanent Garda on duty.

== Singapore ==
Since 1975, national service conscripts in Singapore have been used as Special Constables as part of the Singapore Police Force in addition to their role in the Singapore Armed Forces and Singapore Civil Defence Force. These Special Constables undergo training at the Home Team Academy where they study police protocol and the penal code.

After training, they are posted to various specialised police departments, where they may undergo further training. Civilians who contribute to the force on a voluntary basis belong to an organisation known as the Volunteer Special Constabulary, which is a department in the Singapore Police Force.

== United Kingdom ==
The term 'special constable' used to refer to any constable not sworn into a territorial police force as a regular constable.

There have been examples in history of paid special constables who were not volunteer police officers. The United Kingdom Atomic Energy Authority Constabulary were sworn in as special constables under the Special Constables Act 1923. However, the passage of the Energy Act 2004 created a new police force – the Civil Nuclear Constabulary – with specifically defined powers and the officers lost their status as special constables. The Yeomen Warders of the Tower of London were first sworn in as special constables in the 1960s, but this stopped in 1991.

There are still a few paid special constables – Port Police are sworn in under Section 79 of the Harbours, Docks, and Piers Clauses Act 1847 and the Epping Forest Keepers are also sworn in as special constables for both the Metropolitan and Essex police districts under the Epping Forest Act 1878.

=== England and Wales ===
English special constables have manifested as various legal entities since 1662, but the modern-day Special Constabulary traces its roots to the Special Constables Act 1831 (1 & 2 Will. 4. c. 41) which was passed as a response to industrial violence.

The role of special constables was redefined into its present incarnation during the First World War when a large force was recruited both to compensate for the loss of regular members who joined the war effort and to add an extra layer of protection during wartime. Special constables were also an important component of the state's response to the British police strikes in 1918 and 1919 and the UK General Strike of 1926.

Special constables have all the legal powers of their regular counterparts both on and off duty and, as of 1 April 2007, can use their powers throughout England and Wales. Prior to this date, special constables' powers only applied within the areas of their own and neighbouring forces. They are generally unpaid, but may receive reimbursement for mileage and other expenses incurred.

Special constables are awarded the Special Constabulary Long Service Medal on the completion of nine years' service with a minimum of fifty tours of duty each year. A bar is added to the medal for each subsequent five years of service. Special constables in England and Wales became eligible for the award of the King's Police Medal (KPM) since 2022, whilst Special Constables in Scotland were already eligible.

=== Northern Ireland ===
In Northern Ireland, the Royal Ulster Constabulary GC (RUC) employed both full-time and part-time reserve constables, the difference being that in addition to carrying out the same duties as the regular force, a number of full-time reserve officers were deployed to carry out static security duty at the homes of VIPs and at vulnerable buildings and police stations. Part-time reserve constables carried out similar duties to their special constabulary counterparts elsewhere in the UK; however, like the full-time reserve, many part-timers also carried out a more security-based role.

With the transformation of the RUC into the Police Service of Northern Ireland (PSNI), 171 part-time constables were appointed in Banbridge, Newtownabbey, Coleraine and Lisburn District Command Units (DCUs). Existing part-time reserve constables were offered training to meet new standards of the PSNI.

Unlike their counterparts in Great Britain, part-time constables, like their predecessors in the RUC and PSNI Reserve, are paid.

The Ulster Special Constabulary (see Ireland below) continued to exist until 1970, when its members were assimilated into the RUC as Auxiliary Constables or the Ulster Defence Regiment.

The Ministry of Defence employs civilian security officers for its Northern Ireland Security Guard Service; these have Special Constable Status. The NISGS is an unionised, non-industrial, civilian, armed, guard service under the authority of the general officer commanding (Northern Ireland), who holds ultimate responsibility for the operation of the organisation.

A civilian security officer (CSO) is attested by a resident magistrate as a special constable whilst on duty within MoD property. They hold similar powers to that of a police constable based on the Emergency Laws (Miscellaneous Provisions) Act 1947. A CSO has the powers of arrest under the Police and Criminal Evidence (Northern Ireland) Order 1989 (PACE).

=== Scotland ===
Special Constables in Scotland were defined as "Members of a Police Force" under terms of the Police (Scotland) Act 1967 and in the subsequent Police and Fire Reform (Scotland) Act 2012. They have identical powers to regular (full-time) constables. By default, they are non-contributing members of the Scottish Police Federation, which is the staff association established by statute for police officers in Scotland from the rank of Constable up to and including that of Chief Inspector, because police officers are forbidden by law to be members of a trade union. Special Constables can elect to pay a monthly membership subscription to the Federation in order to provide them with the same membership rights and protections as regular officers. Membership of the Association of Special Constabulary Officers is also open to all warranted Special Constables in Police Scotland.

Special Constables receive some travel expenses and allowances from the police service, plus a £1100 "recognition award" for all officers completing the required 180 hours of service every year. There is a half-year award scheme which offers £500 at the end of the financial year for completing 90 hours. This is mainly for the benefit of Special Constables sworn in part way through the financial year; Special Constables who were sworn in after the start of the 180-hour recognition award scheme cannot opt for the 180-hour scheme. Their work is otherwise voluntary and unpaid.

Most Scottish Special Constables work alongside regular Constables, and their uniform is the same except that their 4-digit shoulder number begins with "7". Special Constables do not have a separate administrative/rank/grade structure. Daily supervision is carried out in line with regular team sergeants/inspectors, and strategic management and training is provided by the Divisional Training Department and a dedicated National Liaison Officer (Inspector).

Special Constables in Scotland can be deployed in a wide range of police duties over and above standard "beat duties". These include Roads Policing, Public Order, Specialist Response, Wildlife Crime and Community Support. Their primary focus, however, remains to provide a highly visible police presence, and a link with local communities across Scotland.

=== Ireland (before creation of Northern Ireland) ===
The Royal Irish Constabulary began recruiting special constables in the 1920s, largely as a reaction to the Irish Republican Army (IRA). In the south and west of Ireland were the Black and Tans, officially the Royal Irish Constabulary Special Reserve, and the Auxiliary Division. The Ulster Special Constabulary (USC) operated in the northeast and were the main bulwark against IRA activity.

The USC was divided into three armed sections: A Specials (full-time and paid); B Specials (part-time and paid an allowance); and C Specials (unpaid and non-uniformed reservists).

== See also ==
- Canadian Auxiliary Constable
- Auxiliary Division
- Auxiliary police
- Black and Tans
- Legion of Frontiersmen
- National Service in Singapore
- Honorary Police
- Parish constable
- Police Support Volunteer
- Security police (US)
- Special police
- Special police force
- Ulster Special Constabulary
- Volunteer Special Constabulary
