= Arkansas Highway Police =

State highway in Arkansas, United States

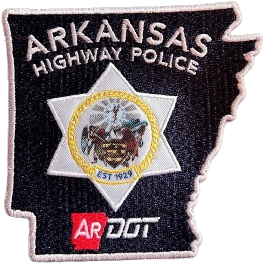
- Patch

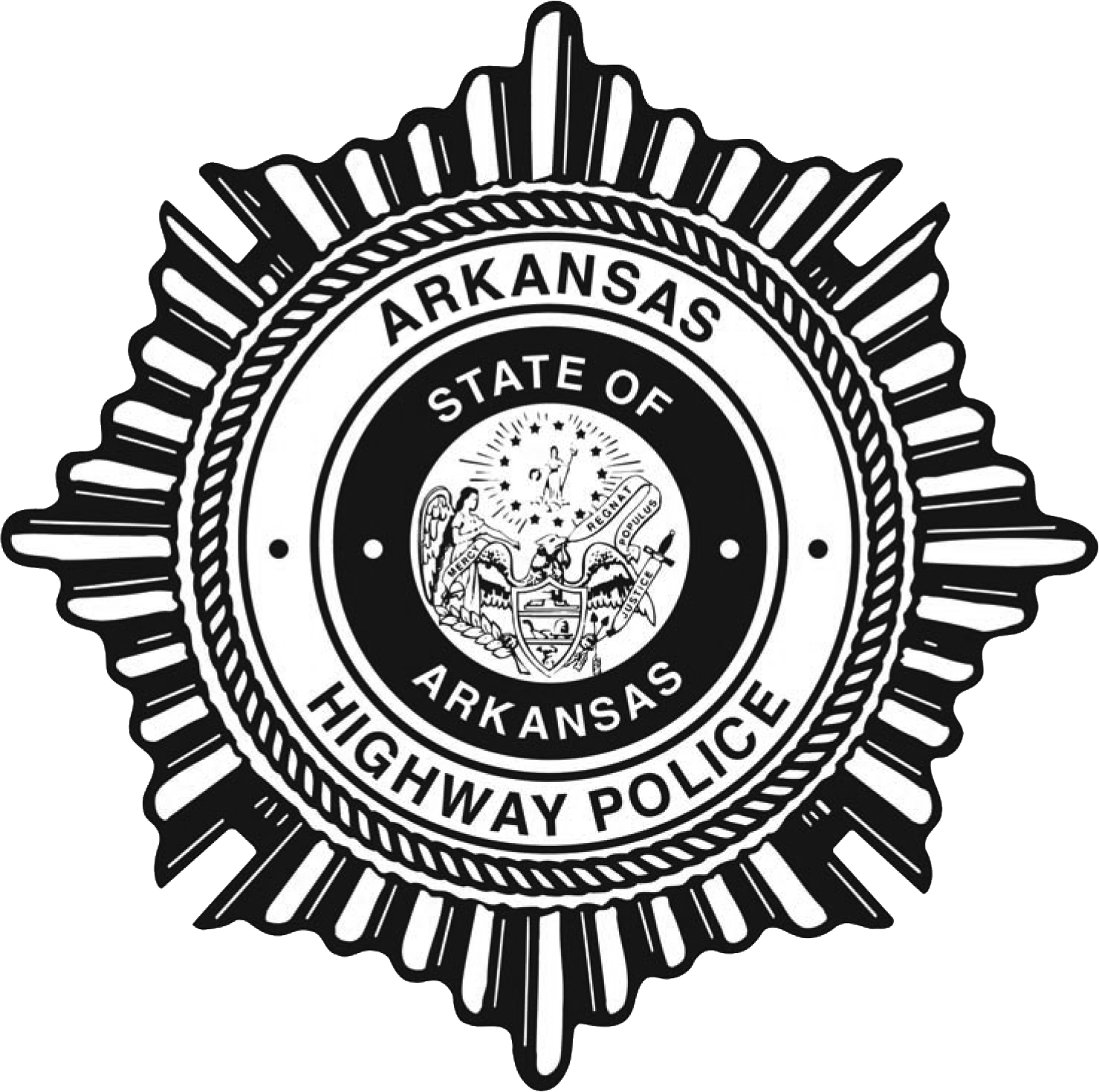
- Badge
- Common name: State Highway Police
- Abbreviation: AHP

Agency overview
- Formed: 1929; 97 years ago
- Annual budget: $4.9 Million
- Legal personality: Governmental: Government agency

Jurisdictional structure
- Operations jurisdiction: Arkansas, USA
- Area: 53,179 square miles (137,730 km^{2})
- Population: 2,834,797 (2007 est.)
- Legal jurisdiction: Arkansas
- Governing body: Government of Arkansas
- General nature: Local civilian police

Operational structure
- Headquarters: Little Rock, Arkansas
- Officers: 210
- Agency executive: Jeff Holmes, Chief
- Parent agency: Arkansas Department of Transportation

Website
- Arkansas Highway Police

Arkansas Highway Police is a state police division of the Arkansas Department of Transportation. The Arkansas Highway Police is responsible for enforcing motor vehicle laws, traffic laws, and commercial vehicle enforcement. It is the second-largest state law enforcement agency in Arkansas after the Arkansas State Police. It was founded in 1929 and is the oldest law enforcement agency in Arkansas.

== History ==
In the 1929 regular session, the Arkansas General Assembly passed Act 299, which was later entitled the State Road Patrol Act. The result of the act was the assignment of administrative oversight of the Arkansas Road Patrol to the Arkansas Highway Department. The men appointed to fill the twenty allocated positions for the patrol became the first enforcement officers in Arkansas to be officially commissioned by state law. The badges issued to the officers were inscribed with, "Arkansas State Highway Police".

Through the years following the creation of the Patrol, the unit was transferred between various agencies, never for more than 15 years. For a time, the agency was a part of the Arkansas Revenue Department, creating a working relationship that transcended all subsequent relocations of the enforcement group. Today, all Highway Police Officers carry a commission as an Agent of the Commissioner of Revenues.

In 1963, the enforcement effort that began as the State Road Patrol, once again became a part of the Arkansas Highway Department. In 1979, the Division's name was changed to the Arkansas Highway Police. In 1989, the powers and duties of the Transportation Safety Agency were transferred to the Highway Police and officers began to include enforcement of the Federal Motor Carrier Safety Administration regulations.

Today, the Arkansas Highway Police is a nationally recognized police force in the fields of drug interdiction, motor carrier safety and hazardous materials enforcement, and training. Highway Police officers serve as instructors for the Criminal Justice Institute, National Training Center, Transportation Safety Institute, and the Drug Interdiction Assistance Program.

== Authority of AHP officers ==
When enforcing commercial vehicle size, weight, and safety laws, AHP officers are authorized by Arkansas Law to stop and inspect commercial vehicles in Arkansas without establishing probable cause or reasonable suspicion.

By statute, AHP is the only police agency in Arkansas that can conduct safety inspections of commercial motor vehicles and is the only agency that can cite drivers and companies for violations of commercial vehicle safety regulations. However any law enforcement officer can stop, cite, and/or arrest commercial operators in Arkansas with a violation of state traffic or criminal statutes.

All officers of the Arkansas Highway Police, regardless of assignment, are also vested with full and complete law enforcement powers of arrest for all crimes both on and off the highways of Arkansas. In addition, officers share concurrent jurisdiction with both the Arkansas State Police and all county Sheriff's Offices in the state.

== Line of duty deaths ==
As of 2025, two Arkansas Highway Police officers have been killed in the line of duty.

== Organization ==
AHP is organizationally divided into five Districts, operating 11 weigh stations and roughly 80 mobile patrol units. Both fixed weigh station facilities and patrol units are dispersed geographically around the state to ensure maximum coverage of major commercial transportation highway routes.

Prior to the 1990s, Arkansas had 20 weigh stations throughout the state. Due to consolidation and a shift in enforcement focus to mobile units, Arkansas current network of 11 Weigh Stations in Arkansas are all located near the borders of the state, and only on major traffic corridors. All patrol units operated by AHP are equipped to weigh, measure, and inspect commercial vehicles without being near a weigh station.

The Arkansas Department of Transportation maintains over 200 roadside pads for AHP Officers on Secondary highways throughout the state. These pads are not fixed weigh stations but extended portions of roadways that give AHP officers room to safely weigh and inspect trucks on highways not provided with weigh stations.

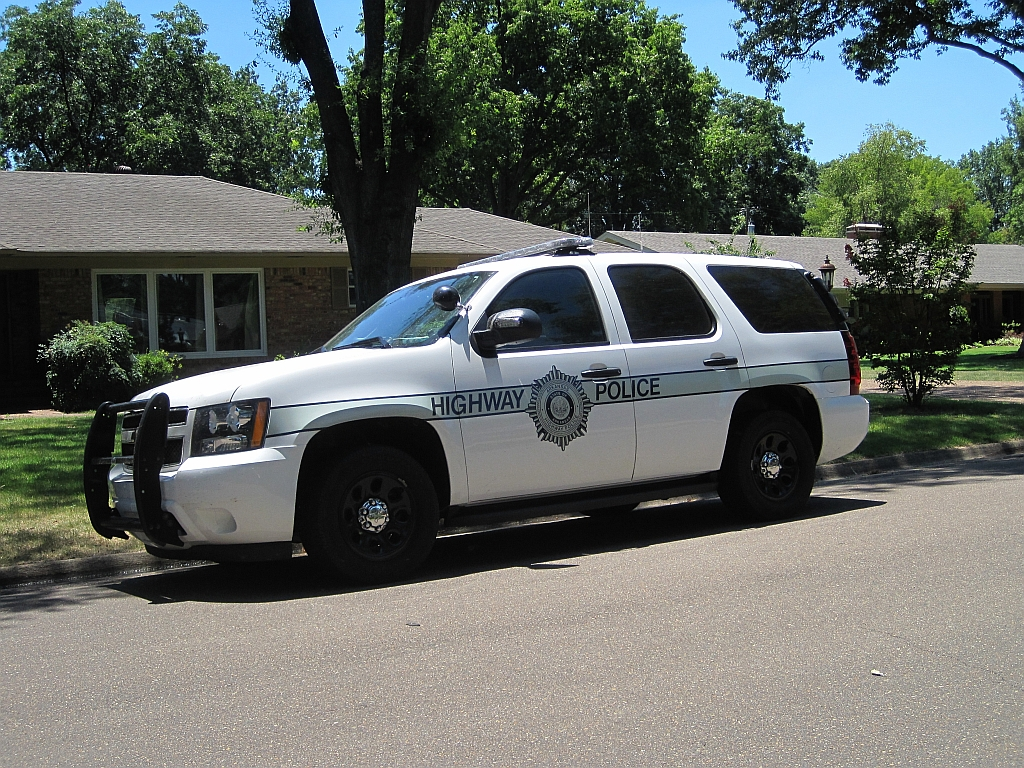
Arkansas Highway Police Sport Utility Vehicle in West Memphis

Locations of current Arkansas weigh-stations
| Traffic route | Closest Arkansas city | Mile marker | Direction | Notes | Closest state border |
|---|---|---|---|---|---|
| US-71/US-59 | Ashdown | .01 | Northbound and Southbound | At the Arkansas bank of the Red River | Texas |
| I-30 | Hope | 26 | Eastbound | | Texas |
| I-30 | Hope | 27 | Westbound | | Texas |
| I-40 | Alma | 9 | Eastbound | | Oklahoma |
| I-40 | Alma | 9 | Westbound | | Oklahoma |
| I-40 | West Memphis | 282 | Westbound | At the Arkansas bank of the Mississippi River | Tennessee |
| I-40 | Lehi | 274 | Eastbound | | Tennessee |
| I-49 | Springdale | 72.2 | Northbound | | Missouri |
| I-49 | Springdale | 70.7 | Southbound | | Missouri |
| I-55 | West Memphis | 1 | Northbound | At the Arkansas bank of the Mississippi River | Tennessee |
| I-55 | Marion | 9 | Southbound | | Tennessee |

== See also ==
- List of law enforcement agencies in Arkansas
- British Columbia Commercial Vehicle Safety and Enforcement
- Saskatchewan Highway Patrol
