= Niagara Regional Police Service =

- Motto: Unity, Loyalty, Responsibility

Agency overview
- Formed: January 1, 1971
- Employees: 1100

Jurisdictional structure
- Operations jurisdiction: Regional Municipality of Niagara, Ontario, Canada
- Area: 1 852.82 sq km
- Population: 477 941
- Governing body: Niagara Regional Police Services Board
- Constituting instrument: Community Safety and Policing Act, 2019 (S.O. 2019, c. 1, Sched. 1)
- General nature: Local civilian police

Operational structure
- Headquarters: Niagara Falls, Ontario
- Sworn members: 774
- Non-sworn members: 326
- Elected officer responsible: The Honourable Michael Kerzner, Solicitor General of Ontario
- Agency executives: Bill Fordy, Chief of Police; Luigi Greco, Deputy Chief of Police; Todd Waselovich, Deputy Chief of Police

Facilities
- Districts: 6

Website
- Official website

The Niagara Regional Police Service (NRPS) is a regional police service maintained by the Regional Municipality of Niagara in the province of Ontario. As of 2021, the force employed 774 sworn police officers and 326 non-sworn support staff members.

The NRPS was established on January 1, 1971, and was the second police service to serve a regional municipality after the Metropolitan Toronto Police Force. Its headquarters is located in Niagara Falls, Ontario.

== History ==
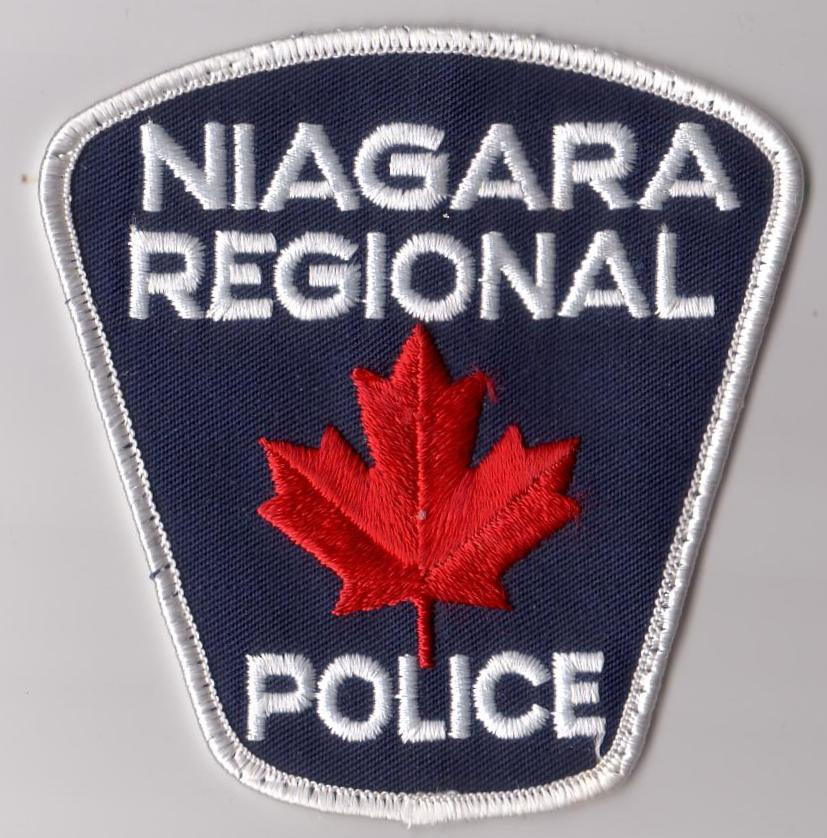
The original shoulder flash of the Niagara Regional Police, used when the force was established in 1971.

The Regional Municipality of Niagara was created on January 1, 1970 through the amalgamation of Welland and Lincoln Counties and the re-organization of the 26 villages, towns, townships, and cities into 12 municipalities. As a part of the reorganization, the municipal police commissions were amalgamated into one regional board, and three deputy chiefs from the region's municipal police forces were appointed to oversee the process of creating a regional police force. One year later, on January 1, 1971, the Niagara Regional Police Force took over policing for the regional municipality, with 398 sworn officers and 42 non-sworn support staff. On February 5, 2025, Constable Joseph Arsenault became the longest-serving member in Niagara Regional Police history, completing 52 years, 6 months, and 4 days of service.

In 2016, the Service opened a new headquarters in Niagara Falls, the first in the force's history that wasn't located in St. Catharines. The new headquarters was designed to replace both the previous headquarters and the Niagara Falls district station. The St. Catharines district station, which had previously also served as the headquarters for the Service, was replaced in 2021.

=== Effingham St Incident ===
On November 29, 2018, Constable Nathan Parker was shot nine times by Detective Sergeant Shane Donovan while the officers investigated a traffic collision in the rural town of Pelham, Ontario. Donovan was leading the collision reconstruction team, while Parker was a district officer assigned to keep the road closed while investigators worked the collision. While Donovan left to refuel his vehicle and pick up food for the investigators, Parker allegedly also left his post without informing any other officers, thus re-opening part of the road. When Donovan confronted him, Parker allegedly became irate, pushing, punching, and then drawing his baton on Det. Sgt. Donovan, to which Donovan responded by attempting to arrest Parker, drawing his firearm in the process. Parker then drew his gun, and Donovan shot Cst. Parker until he fell to the ground. Donovan then radioed for an ambulance, saying "PC Parker attacked me, shots fired" and "he did pull a gun on me, but I shot him." Parker survived the shooting with serious injuries.

Immediately after the shooting, the SIU invoked its mandate to investigate the shooting, and the chief of the Niagara Regional Police Service requested the OPP conduct a parallel investigation to "determine if there was any criminal culpability outside of the SIU’s scope."

Parker had a history of misconduct, facing four different disciplinary board hearings, three of which were for violent behaviour. At the time of the shooting, Parker had been docked a cumulative 326 hours of pay for incidents that included excessive force used against prisoners, arresting a cyclist without cause, and opening his investigation into a supervisor who had already been cleared of wrongdoing. His reputation was so poor that one Niagara officer told the Toronto Sun that "nobody feels sorry for [Parker]," prompting questions about why Parker had been employed by the force before the shooting.

In March 2019, the SIU charged Det. Sgt. Donovan was charged with attempted murder, aggravated assault, and assault with a weapon. Those charges were dropped by the Crown months later, citing a lack of reasonable prospect of conviction. The OPP, meanwhile, charged Cst. Parker with assaulting a peace officer, assault with intent to resist arrest, and assault with a weapon. The charges against Parker were also dropped after a brief trial after it was revealed that Donovan had inappropriately accessed case evidence — evidence he had from when he had been a defendant on the SIU charges. Donovan was subsequently charged with perjury in 2022.

That same year, Cst. Parker was charged with mischief under $5000 and assault by the Halton Regional Police Service in an unrelated road rage incident that occurred while Parker had been off-duty.

=== Police chiefs ===
Chief	Tenure
Albert E. Shennan	1971-1977
Donald Harris	1977-1984
James A. Gayder	1984-1987
John E. Shoveller	1987-1993
J. Grant Waddell	1993-2000
Gary E. Nicholls	2000-2005
Wendy E. Southhall	2005-2012
Jeffrey McGuire	2012-2017
Bryan MacCulloch	2017-2024
Bill Fordy	2024-

=== Line of duty deaths ===
Since the Service's incorporation in 1971, five Regional Police officers have died in the line of duty.

Name	Date	Cause of death
Constable Luciano DeSimone	May 2, 1974	Automobile accident
Constable Stephen Peazel	January 25, 1988	Pulmonary embolism (complications from workplace injury)
Constable Jeffrey Paolozzi	February 6, 1993	Accidental gunfire
Constable Daniel Rathonyi	September 15, 2005	Heart failure
Constable Joan VanBreda	May 22, 2020	Medical complications from the 1986 workplace injury

== Organization ==
The NRPS provides all general policing duties in the region, including patrol of municipal and regional roads and waterways within the region, including the Welland Canal, the Niagara River, and lakes Erie and Ontario. Patrol of provincial highways in the region, such as the Queen Elizabeth Way, is handled by the Ontario Provincial Police, while patrol services on Niagara Parks Commission property are handled by the Niagara Parks Police Service. However, this police service is mandated to investigate all major crimes in the region, including those that occur on provincial highways or NPC property.

=== Police services board ===
Like all municipalities in Ontario, the Regional Municipality of Niagara maintains a police services board, responsible for overseeing policing services in the Region. The board approves the police budget, hires the chief and deputy chiefs of police directly, and is the legal employer of every Niagara Regional Police employee. Although the board sets overall service policy and direction, it has no operational control over the service or its officers, and day-to-day policing decisions are the exclusive jurisdiction of the police chief.

The Board has 2 full-time employees, an executive director, and an executive assistant, and consists of seven members: the regional chair (or their designate); two regional councillors; one member of the public appointed by the regional council; and three members of the public appointed by the province. As of 2023, its members are:

Name	Position	Appointed by
Jen Lawson	Chair	Province
David Eke	Vice-chair	Province
Tara McKendrick	Member	Province
Pat Chiocchio	Councillor	Niagara Regional Council
Laura Ip	Councillor	Niagara Regional Council
Bill Steele	Councillor	Niagara Regional Council
Nyarayi Kapisavanhu	Member	Niagara Regional Council

==== Special constabularies ====
In addition to maintaining the Niagara Regional Police Service, the Board is responsible for approving and overseeing special constabularies that operate in the regional municipality. Currently, there are two special constabularies under the Board's jurisdiction, the Niagara Parks Police Service and the Brock University Campus Safety Services division. The Parks Police Service is unique among special constabularies in Ontario in that its members carry firearms and are trained alongside police officers at the Ontario Police College.

=== Rank structure ===
Rank	Chief of police	Deputy chief	Superintendent	Inspector	Staff sergeant	Sergeant	Constable
Insignia (Slip-on)							
Insignia (Shoulder board)					Shoulder boards not used for these ranks		

=== Districts ===
The Niagara Regional Police Service is divided into six districts, numbered 1-3, 5-6, and 8:

Name	Address	Communities served
1 District	198 Welland Avenue	St. Catharines, Thorold
2 District	5700 Valley Way	Niagara Falls, Niagara-on-the-Lake
3 District	5 Lincoln Street West	Welland, Pelham
5 District	650 Gilmore Road	Fort Erie
6 District	501 Fielden Avenue	Port Colborne, Wainfleet
8 District	45 Clarke Street	Grimsby, Lincoln, West Lincoln

Headquarters and administrative offices are located at 5700 Valley Way, Niagara Falls, Ontario.

Support services are located on Welland Canals Parkway in St. Catharines.

2 District is also referred to as the Casino District.

=== Services ===
Emergency Services	Executive Services	Investigative Support Services	Special Investigative Services	Special Victims Unit
Marine Unit	Community Oriented Response & Engagement (CORE)	Special Investigative Services	Drugs & Morality	Child Abuse Unit (CAU)
Underwater Search and Recovery Unit	Corporate Analysis	Special Victims Units	Intelligence	Domestic Violence Unit (DVU)
Canine Unit	Corporate Communications	Major Crime	Joint Forces Operation	Human Trafficking Unit (HTU)
Emergency Task Unit	Labour Relations		Provincial Anti Violence Intervention Strategy (PAVIS)	Internet Child Exploitation Unit (ICE)
Explosive Disposal Unit	Member Support Unit			Offender Management Unit (OMU)
Crisis Negotiators	Policy and Risk Management			Sexual Assault Unit (SAU)
Collision Reconstruction Unit	Professional Development			Technological Crime Unit (Tech Crimes)
Traffic Enforcement Unit	Professional Standards			Computer Cyber Crime Unit (C3)
	Video Unit OPVTA			

==== Pipes and Drums Band ====
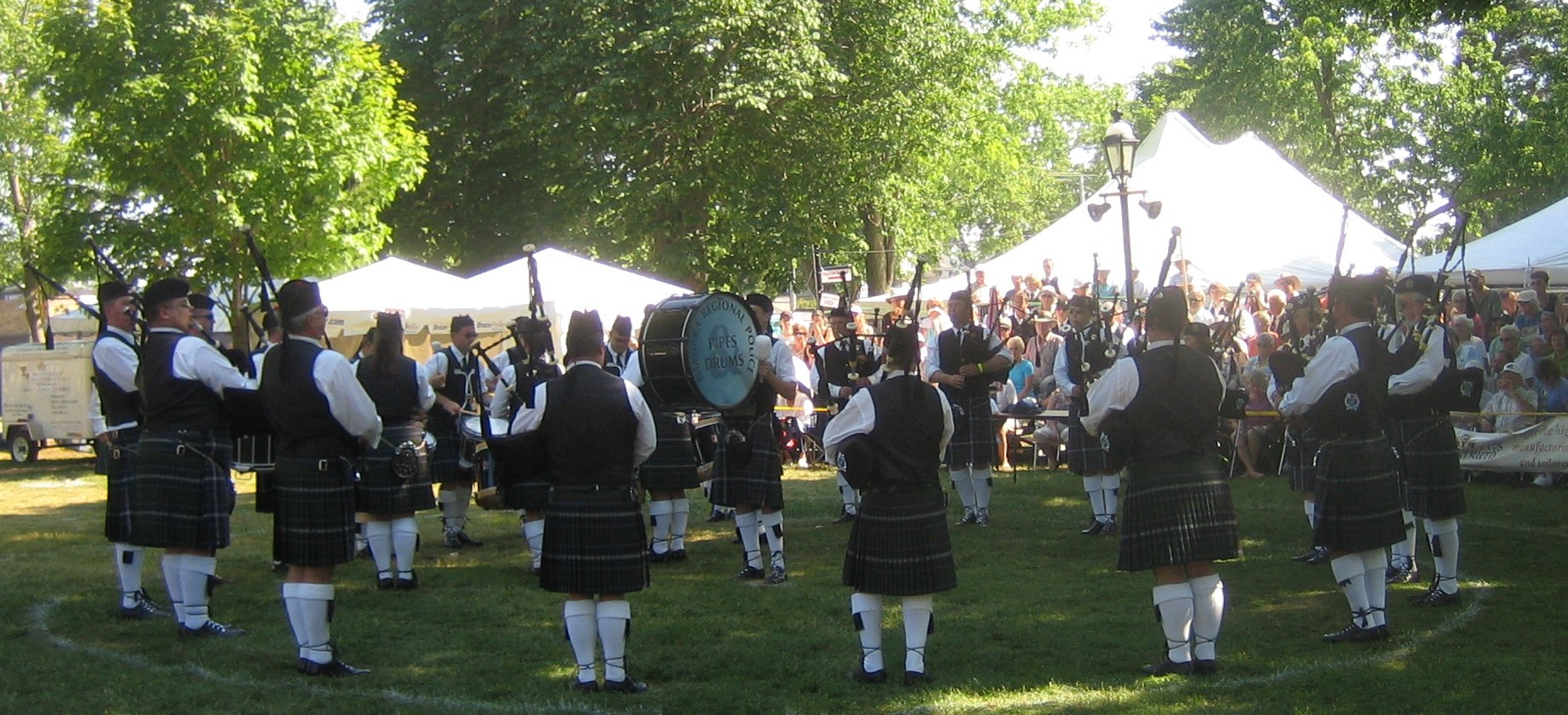
Members of the Niagara Regional Police Service's Pipes and Drums band participate in the 2007 Kincardine Scottish Festival.

The Niagara Regional Police Pipe Band is a grade three pipe band based in Niagara Falls.

The band's pipe major is Alick Feller.

There was a grade 2 pipe band in existence until the end of the 2009 season, led by Dave Goodall (pipe major) and Graham Kirkwood (drum sergeant), however, that group dissolved in the fall of 2009.

==== Mounted Unit ====
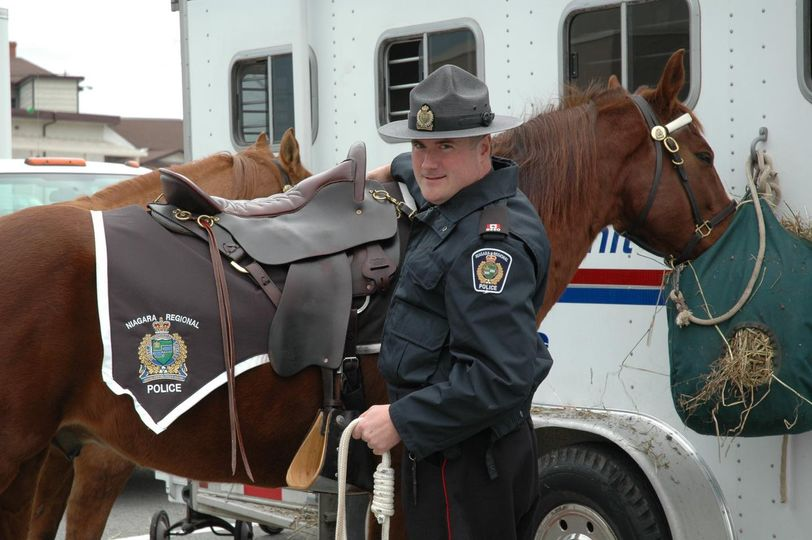
Mounted Unit

Members of the mounted unit are part of the force's colour guard. There are three horses in the unit, with the other three horses retired. Two of the three horses are owned by the Niagara Regional Police Service. On November 25, 2010, the Niagara Regional Police Services Mounted Unit was disbanded for budgetary reasons. The annual budget of $30,000.00 used to care for the horses was redistributed elsewhere.

==== Marine Unit ====
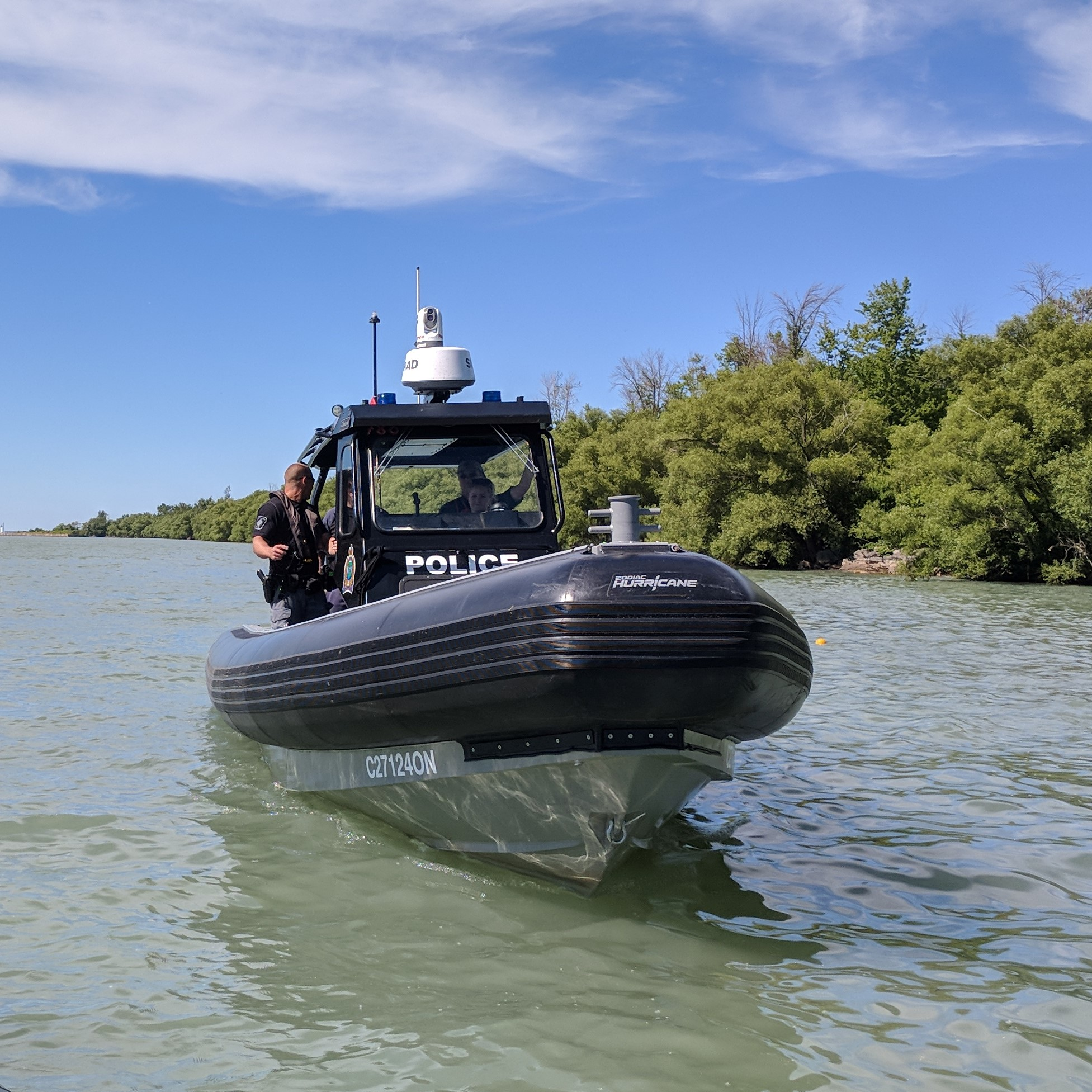
Zodiac 940

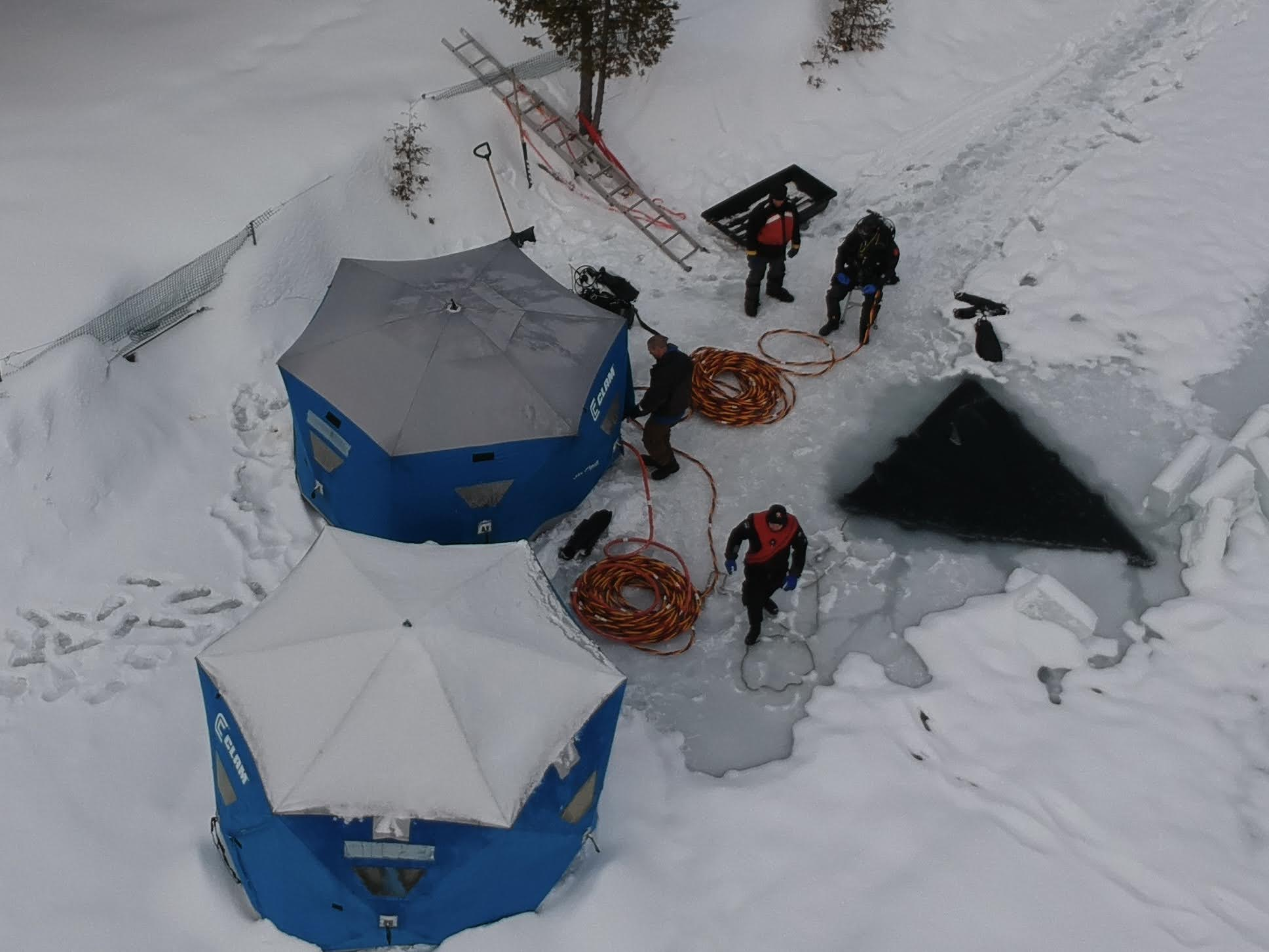
Subice Diving

Because crime and the need for assistance aren't limited to land, the Niagara Regional Police Service's Marine Unit enforces laws on the lakes and waterways of the Niagara Region. They conduct general patrol duties at Lake Erie, Lake Ontario, the Niagara River, and other water sanctuaries within the Canada-United States international boundary line. Officers in this unit enforce the Criminal Code, Narcotics, and Liquor Licence Act offenses in addition to marine and navigation laws. The Marine Unit also assists in search, rescue, and recovery operations whenever required. In doing so, they collaborate with other units within the Niagara Regional Police Service, as well as with other police services and law enforcement agencies related to the judicial process.

==== Underwater Search and Recovery Unit ====
The mandate of the Underwater Search & Recovery Unit Diver Unit (USRU) is to extend the police function underwater with a cost-effective, highly trained, and equipped underwater forensic response that meets the needs of the service, the citizens of Niagara, and our contracted partners. The underwater capability must be as forensically and professionally reliable as police duties that are executed on land, and meet the legislated competency requirements prescribed by CSA Z275.4-02 Competency Standard for Diving Operations.

All USRU members must be sworn police officers and certified divers before they can apply to the team. Candidates are put through a challenging Phase I: Diver Selection week where they complete a variety of tests, including basic diving knowledge, watermanship and stamina, claustrophobia, and skills assessments. This selection program ensures all the applicants have the aptitude to take part in this unique form of commercial diving. Successful candidates then complete six weeks of qualification training based on CSA Standards to develop the requisite knowledge, skills, and experience to eventually challenge a formal external audit process prescribed by the Diver Certification Board of Canada (DCBC). The USRU assists in the forensic recovery of human remains, SCUBA fatalities, sunken vehicles, sunken vessels, air crash investigations, and weapons recovery. All members are certified in harbour clearing, hull searching, and explosives recognition. They are also trained in underwater explosives disposal and improvised explosive device render safe. Since 1998, Niagara’s eight-person USRU has provided search, rescue, and recovery services for the Waterloo Regional Police on a 24/7 contract basis. Officers are also trained in ice rescue and swift water rescue.

== Fleet ==
=== Vehicle Fleet ===
- Ford Police Interceptor Utility (Traffic Enforcement Unit unmarked, marked, supervisor, duty officer, canine unit)
- Ford Police Interceptor Sedan
- Chevrolet Suburban (Emergency Task Force, unmarked)
- Ford Transit 150 (Forensic Services)
- Ford F250 (Emergency Task Force, unmarked)
- 2021 Chevrolet Tahoe PPV (Traffic Enforcement Unit unmarked)
- Ford F150 (Traffic Enforcement Unit unmarked)
- Terradyne Armored Vehicles Gurkha (Emergency Task Force)
- Ford F350 (Marine Unit)
- Dodge Grand Caravan (Recruiting Unit marked)
- Dodge Durango

=== Vessel Fleet ===
Make	Origin	In-service Retired
Protector	New Zealand	Retired
Seadoo GTX	Canada	Retired
Titan Boats	Canada	In-Service
Zodiac 940	United States	In-Service
Zodiac 940	United States	In-Service
Zodiac Inflatable	United States	In-Service
Yamaha Waverunner	United States	In-Service

Following changes to the Ontario Highway Traffic Act in August 2007, the Niagara Regional Police Service began replacing red and white "Street Hawk" emergency lights on police vehicles with new blue and red LED lights. Older-style light bars were gradually phased out through attrition.

Niagara Regional Police Service marked patrol vehicles have historically been white. In the late 1980s to the early 1990s, they were distinguished with royal blue hoods and a single blue stripe on the sides of the vehicle. In the mid-1990s, the service adopted the crest used today, switching to blue and green stripes on the sides of patrol vehicles, and abandoning the traditional blue hoods. This striping change was relatively short-lived, with the service soon adopting red and blue striping more commonly seen on police vehicles in Ontario. In 2013, the Niagara Regional Police Service commenced a rebranding of marked patrol vehicles, adopting a black and white colour scheme, with silver and red graphics, which is being phased in as vehicles are replaced through attrition.

== See also ==
- Integrated Security Unit
- Niagara Parks Police Service
- Regional police services in Canada
- Regional Municipality of Niagara
