= Arkansas Highways =

- Editor: David Nilles
- Former editors: Randy Ort
- Frequency: bimonthly
- First issue: 1925
- Company: Arkansas Department of Transportation
- Country: United States
- Based in: Little Rock, Arkansas
- Language: English
- Website: www.arkansashighways.com/magazine.aspx
- ISSN: 0004-1521
- OCLC: 567651874

Arkansas Highways is a magazine that contains updates and information, as well as artistic photographs related to the state of Arkansas and the Arkansas Highway System. It is published bimonthly in Little Rock, Arkansas by the Public Information Office of the Arkansas Department of Transportation (ARDOT).

== Description ==
The magazine began in 1924 by the Arkansas State Highway Commission (now the ARDOT) as an engineering journal dedicated to road construction and maintenance within Arkansas. The publication also featured interviews with staff engineers and commissioners as well as projections for future state highway projects. Updates from each division, department-wide events, and honors for retiring staff are also included. Cartoons and a joke section were formerly part of each magazine.

The magazine began as a monthly publication, but ceased publication from 1933-1952. Volumes were renumbered following resumption in 1953. Publication became quarterly for one year in 1971, was published irregularly through 1974, and became bimonthly from 1975-1999. Arkansas Highways became biannual from 2000-2012, though only one issue was published per year from 2007-2009. In 2013, the magazine resumed bimonthly publication, which continues today. The magazine is given to all staff members and is provided free to the public for no charge upon request.
