= British Columbia Commercial Vehicle Safety and Enforcement =

Commercial Vehicle Safety & Enforcement
- Current shoulder patch of the CVSE

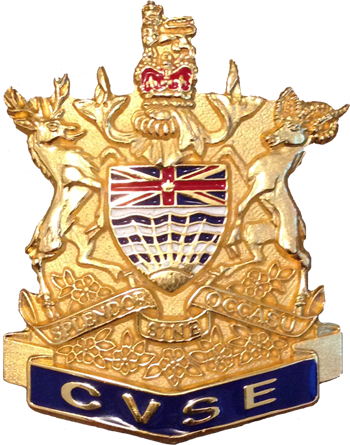
- Badge cap of the CVSE

- Wallet badge of the CVSE
- Common name: CVSE officer
- Abbreviation: CVSE
- Motto: Splendor Sine Occasu; Splendor Without Diminishment

Agency overview
- Formed: 1958
- Employees: 286

Jurisdictional structure
- Operations jurisdiction: British Columbia, Canada
- Area: 944,735 km2
- Population: 4,622,000
- Legal jurisdiction: Province of British Columbia
- Governing body: British Columbia Ministry of Transportation
- Constituting instrument: Motor Vehicle Act, Inspectors Authorization Regulation and Transport of Dangerous Good Act

Operational structure
- Headquarters: Victoria, BC
- Elected officer responsible: The Honourable Rob Fleming, Minister of Transportation & Infrastructure
- Agency executive: Samantha Eburne, Director

Facilities
- Stations: 24
- Patrol car models: Ford F-Series, Ford Interceptor, Chevrolet Tahoe, Chevrolet Silverado, Chevrolet Impala, Dodge Ram, Dodge Charger, Dodge Durango, GMC Sierra
- Marked patrol cars: Yes
- Unmarked patrol cars: Yes

Website
- Commercial Vehicle Safety & Enforcement

British Columbia Commercial Vehicle Safety & Enforcement (BC CVSE) is a provincial law enforcement agency that is responsible for the compliance and enforcement of the commercial transport sector, protection of the environment and transportation infrastructure of British Columbia, increasing road safety and protecting the motoring public.

CVSE officers are provincial peace officers who are empowered by the Motor Vehicle Act, Inspectors Authorization Regulation and Transport of Dangerous Goods Act to enforce provincial and select pieces of federal legislation. These acts are the Motor Vehicle Act, Commercial Transport Act, Transportation Act, Passenger Transportation Act, Transport of Dangerous Goods Act, Motor Fuel Tax Act and the federal Transportation of Dangerous Goods Act regulations.

CVSE is headquartered out of Victoria, the provincial capital of British Columbia and operates out of 24 inspection stations throughout the province. Areas with converted self-weigh scales and decommissioned inspection stations are actively patrolled by vehicle.

== History ==
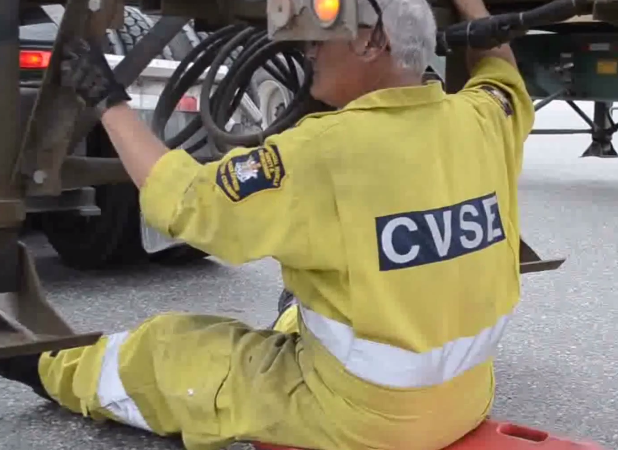
CVSE officer performing a CVSA Level 1 Inspection

CVSE was conceived in 1958 as the British Columbia Department of Commercial Transport. Upon conception, CVSE became responsible for 15 fixed scale locations and 6 portable scale patrol vehicles operated by weighmasters throughout the province. The purpose of these facilities and patrol vehicles was to protect the transportation network and infrastructure from overweight vehicles. In the 1980s, the agency expanded its mandate to include physical vehicle inspections (included in this expansion were the certified red seal mechanics that were already government inspectors working at inspection facilities that had been in place in the Lower Mainland of BC since at least the 1940s), cargo securement, document checks and driver checks to ensure that drivers, vehicles, and cargo were safe to traverse the roadway. In 1988 the agency also absorbed the BC Highways Patrol officers, which had been in existence as well in BC since 1958. This expanding mandate and broadening focus on public safety led the former weighmasters, highway patrol officers and government vehicle inspectors into becoming commercial transport inspectors and portable inspectors. In 2005, to further focus on traffic safety and vehicle inspection duties, CVSE granted the authority to their peace officers to perform traffic enforcement duties on moving violations and off-loaded the responsibility of writing permits onto the newly created Provincial Permit Centre. Currently, CVSE performs undercover plainclothes operations, assists partner law enforcement agencies in commercial transport related investigations, takes part in multi-agency traffic enforcement blitzes and is responsible for the inspection and enforcement of the National Safety Code, transportation of dangerous goods and vehicle inspection standards of hundreds of thousands of commercial vehicles.

Since CVSE's conception, it has changed hands many times. From 1958 until 1998, CVSE was administered through the Motor Vehicle Branch of the Ministry of Transportation. In 1998, CVSE was transferred to the Insurance Corporation of British Columbia (ICBC). In 2003, CVSE was then transferred to the Ministry of Justice and the solicitor general. Today, CVSE is a firm part of the BC Ministry of Transportation and Infrastructure and has been since its return to the ministry in 2005. Currently, a new livery featuring battenburg markings is being phased in for new CVSE patrol vehicles.

British Columbia is a founding member of the Commercial Vehicle Safety Alliance (CVSA). All CVSE officers and some police officers from various police departments in British Columbia are certified to perform vehicle inspections through the CVSA. CVSA is a North American inspection and safety standard encompassing the countries of Canada, the United States and Mexico.

== Officer roles ==
Currently, within CVSE there are six distinct roles that officers fulfill. These six roles are described in the following.

Commercial transport enforcement officers (CTEOs) are the most visible of the six roles. CTEOs are responsible for enforcing and ensuring compliance with the acts and regulations that govern the road transportation industry through vehicle, driver and document inspections, protecting the road network and infrastructure and providing road safety through traffic enforcement and safety checks. CTEOs are a combination of two legacy roles - portable inspector (PI) and commercial transport inspector (CTI) - and as such, CTEOs operate both the stationary vehicle inspection stations and mobile patrol vehicles for more traditional highway patrol and traffic enforcement purposes. CTEOs can issue warnings, appearance notices, violation tickets, out-of-service declarations, order mechanical inspections, driver license suspensions, vehicle impounds and may delay or detain vehicles and drivers.

Area vehicle inspectors (AVIs) work independently and generally tend to have a very high workload. AVIs have the authority to inspect all vehicles in the province, private motor vehicles included. AVIs are responsible for investigating fatal accidents involving commercial vehicles when asked to do so by local police, viewing and assessing facility applications for Designated Inspection Facility (DIF) status, performing facility audits on DIFs and inspecting vehicles. This position primarily focuses on monitoring both private and government carriers to ensure passenger transport vehicles meet and comply with provincial safety standards. Similar to the CTEO, AVIs can issue warnings, appearance notices, violation tickets, out-of-service declarations, order mechanical inspections, driver license suspensions, vehicle impounds and may delay or detain vehicles and drivers. AVIs primarily work out of their respective regional office buildings or a vehicle only and are trained and certified red seal mechanics.

Carrier safety inspectors (CSIs) are independent investigators whose primary purpose is monitoring drivers and carriers for National Safety Code program compliance. As part of the monitoring process, CSIs conduct investigations, interviews, inspections and quantifiable audits of driver and carrier documents, records and paperwork in accordance with national standards, and also provide training and seminars to industry and partner agencies. CSIs have the authority to issue carrier safety demerits and to cancel or suspend a carrier's NSC required for business operations. CSIs can issue warnings, appearance notices, violation tickets, out-of-service declarations, order mechanical inspections, driver license suspensions, vehicle impounds and may delay or detain vehicles and drivers. CSIs primarily work out of their respective regional office buildings or a vehicle only and are ISO trained and certified.

Dangerous goods inspectors (DGIs) are specialized independent enforcement officers that primarily spend most of their time in a vehicle on patrol. DGIs are responsible for providing education to drivers and carriers, seeking compliance with and enforcing the Transportation of Dangerous Good Regulations of Canada and are empowered by the Transport of Dangerous Goods Act of British Columbia. DGIs regularly liaise with Transport Canada and may assist Transport Canada with investigations into non-compliant carriers or facilities. DGIs have a thorough understanding of the federal regulations and all of its parts relating to road transport including parts 1 to 9, schedules 1 to 3 and equivalent level of safety certificates. Much like CTEOs and AVIs, DGIs can issue warnings, appearance notices, violation tickets, out-of-service declarations, order mechanical inspections, driver license suspensions, vehicle impounds, and may delay or detain vehicles and drivers. DGIs often have years of prior experience in a previous role such a CTI or CTEO and are trained and certified in the transportation of dangerous goods prior to becoming DGIs.

Commercial transport inspectors (CTIs) are responsible for solely operating the stationary vehicle inspections stations and do not operate mobile patrol vehicles or perform any kind of traffic enforcement. CTIs are responsible for enforcing and ensuring compliance with all applicable acts and regulations that govern the road transportation industry through vehicle, driver and document inspections. CTIs can issue warnings, appearance notices, violation tickets, out-of-service declarations, order mechanical inspections, driver license suspensions, vehicle impounds and may delay or detain vehicles and drivers.

Portable inspectors (PIs) are responsible for operating mobile patrol vehicles for traffic enforcement and vehicles inspection duties and are restricted from operating stationary inspection stations. PIs are responsible for enforcing and ensuring compliance with all applicable acts and regulations that govern the road transportation industry through roadside vehicle, driver and document inspections as well as providing road safety through traffic enforcement and safety checks. PIs can issue warnings, appearance notices, violation tickets, out-of-service declarations, order mechanical inspections, driver license suspensions, vehicle impounds and may delay or detain vehicles and drivers.

== Selection and recruitment ==
CVSE officers of all roles are hand selected through a multi-step recruitment process which is handled by regional CVSE managers and the BC Public Service Agency. When a posting is open, an applicant must apply online and if selected must attend and pass the following: one or more aptitude tests involving all applicable legislation and the history, vision, and goals of the CVSE, a physical test involving work based scenarios and a driving assessment with an experienced CVSE officer. Upon successful completion, an applicant is then invited to a panel interview involving various members of the agency. An applicant will then go through a reference check and a security clearance involving a criminal record check and a background investigation through the Office of the Solicitor General and the Ministry of Justice.

== Training ==
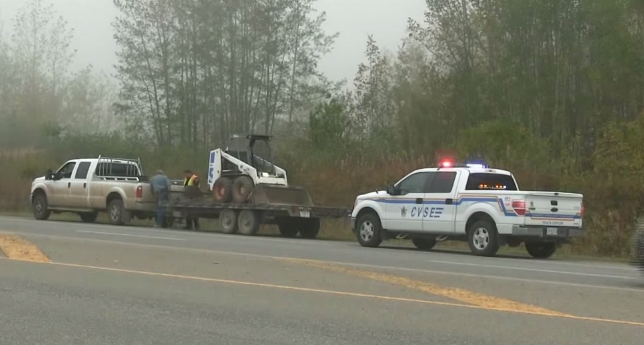
CVSE patrol car with lights activated at a traffic stop.

CVSE officers receive a large variety of training that is delivered through local police forces, in-house instruction, on-the-job training and the Justice Institute of British Columbia. Training programs delivered to CVSE officers encompass criminal justice system, investigative skills and processes, criminal law, report writing, administrative law, enhanced investigation interviewing, tactical communication, testifying in legal proceedings, incident command, weights and dimensions, airbrake enforcement, transportation of dangerous goods, cargo securement, CVSA inspection certification, emergency vehicle operations, P-Tec total control driving, mobile patrol operations, conventional radar and LIDAR. Marching, dress and deportment is reserved for ceremonial unit members only. CVSE officers may receive training on additional topics or equipment once deployed dependent upon district focus.

Throughout the course of a CVSE officer's duties, an officer may be subjected to abusive language, aggressive and assaultive behaviour, violence and may be exposed to both organized and unorganized crime. As a result, CVSE officers are provided with basic use of force and officer safety training.

CVSE officers receive incident command training from the Justice Institute of British Columbia under the Incident Command System and can be deployed during emergencies to assist local law enforcement bodies with public safety.

== Ceremonial unit ==
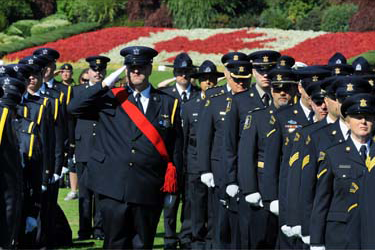
A ceremonial unit standing at attention at the Peace Officers Memorial Day ceremony.

Inaugurated in 2015, the CVSE Ceremonial Unit (CU) is composed of volunteer members from various parts of the province. Training for the unit involves rigorous training in marching, dress, deportment and ceremonial protocol. The unit meets multiple times a year to train and is headed and trained by a departmental sergeant major.

Members of the ceremonial unit conform to the provincial standard for peace officer ceremonial wear. This standard consists of a dark blue tunic with dark blue wool pants, CVSE shoulder flashes, a gold lanyard, white gloves, gold belt and belt buckle, a brimmed forage cap and polished dress shoes. The departmental sergeant major's dress also includes a red sash and a gold brimmed forage cap. If a member has medals from previous service, they are also permitted to be worn.

The goals of the CVSE Ceremonial Unit are:

- To preserve law enforcement tradition and enhance the agency's profile within the law enforcement community
- To attend and represent the CVSE at national and provincial events and ceremonies such the Peace Officers Memorial Day, National Day of Mourning, Remembrance Day, Canada Day, etc.
- To provide a formalized presence on specific occasions such as service and regimental funerals of the CVSE and other agencies
- To provide ambassadors on other authorized occasions

== Rank structure ==
- Departmental sergeant major (CU only)
- Troop sergeant (CU only)

No traditional ranking system outside of the ceremonial unit is in place.

== See also ==
- British Columbia Ministry of Transportation
- List of law enforcement agencies in British Columbia
- Traffic stops
- Saskatchewan Highway Patrol
- Arkansas Highway Police
