= Arkansas Department of Transportation =

Government agency in Arkansas, United States

- Seal

- Logo

Agency overview
- Formed: 1913; 113 years ago
- Jurisdiction: Arkansas Highway System
- Headquarters: 10324 Interstate 30, Little Rock, Arkansas; 34°40′15.8″N 92°22′57.8″W
- Employees: 3,693 (Note: As of December 31, 2016)
- Annual budget: ▲US$1,212,817,331 (Note: Fiscal Year 2016, includes Interstate Rehabilitation Program projects authorized by a November 2011 vote funded with bond proceeds and Connecting Arkansas Program projects authorized by a half-cent sales tax increase in 2012.)
- Agency executives: Jared Wiley, Director; Jessie Jones, Chief Engineer for Preconstruction; Rex Vines, Chief Engineer for Operations; Kevin Thornton, Chief of Administration
- Parent agency: Arkansas State Highway Commission
- Child agency: Arkansas Highway Police
- Website: ardot.gov

The Arkansas Department of Transportation (ARDOT), formerly the Arkansas Highway and Transportation Department, is a government department in the U.S. state of Arkansas. Its mission is to provide a safe, efficient, aesthetically pleasing and environmentally sound intermodal transportation system for the user. The department is responsible for implementing policy made by the Arkansas State Highway Commission, a board of officials appointed by the Governor of Arkansas to direct transportation policy in the state. The department's director is appointed by the commission to hire staff and manage construction and maintenance on Arkansas's highways.

The primary duty of ARDOT is the maintenance and management of the over 16,000-mile (26,000 km) Arkansas Highway System. The department also conducts planning, public transportation, the State Aid County Road Program, the Arkansas Highway Police, and Federal-Aid project administration. Its headquarters are in Little Rock.

== History ==
Central control of highway transportation in Arkansas began with the creation of the State Highway Commission by Act 302 of the 39th Arkansas General Assembly in 1913. The commission was made up of the Arkansas Commissioner of State Lands and two other governor-appointed members. The commission was tasked with coordination roadway construction standards and route planning among the state's myriad county agencies and road improvement districts, and had little power or funding. The situation was bad enough that the federal government, who had become involved in standardizing road construction, stopped sending federal highway dollars to Arkansas in 1923. An emergency session of the 44th Arkansas General Assembly enacted the Harrelson Road Law to meet federal requirements to receive funding. The act also reformed the Highway Commission into four members appointed from the state's agricultural districts by the governor, plus the Commissioner of State Lands (elected statewide) serving as chairman. The Highway Commission had purview over any road projects in the state meeting their standards. Given the ability to control where federal highway dollars were spent, the Highway Commission became very powerful, and subject to political and provincial interests. This Commission became so powerful, the Commissioner of State Lands was unofficially referred to as the Highway Commissioner almost everywhere except official state documents.

=== Naming ===
The "Highway" in AHTD's name was largely required by the Arkansas Constitution which created the Arkansas Highway Commission as its governing body; the Constitution still calls it the "State Highway Department", but the legislature added "and Transportation" to its name in 1977. Many people in Arkansas continue to call it the "Highway Department" to this day.

On June 8, 2017, the AHTD announced that it would change its name and logo to the Arkansas Department of Transportation (ARDOT) effective July 31, 2017.

== Administration ==
For administrative purposes, ARDOT divided the state of Arkansas into 10 districts supervised by district offices along with 75 county area maintenance headquarters and 31 resident engineer offices located across the state. Most districts covered multiple counties. As a state agency, its central offices are located in Little Rock, which is covered by District 6.

Name	Office	Region
District 1	Wynne	Arkansas Delta
District 2	Pine Bluff	Southeast Arkansas
District 3	Hope	Southwest Arkansas
District 4	Barling	Western Arkansas
District 5	Batesville	Eastern Ozarks
District 6	Little Rock	Central Arkansas
District 7	Camden	South Arkansas
District 8	Russellville	Arkansas River Valley
District 9	Bellefonte	Western Ozarks
District 10	Paragould	Northeast Arkansas

== Divisions ==
The ARDOT currently is divided into 27 divisions. Several of these divisions are administrative: Computer Services, Equipment and Procurement, Fiscal Services, Human Resources, Internal Audit, Legal, Maintenance, and Retirement. Others lead various aspects of highway construction design, construction, financing, planning or coordination. Divisions are further subdivided into Sections.

=== Bridges ===
The Bridge Division contains six Sections: four of bridge design engineers, the Structural Inventory and Rating Section for existing bridges, and the Concrete & Steel Fabrication Section. Many of Arkansas's highway bridges are designed in-house by the relevant sections, with more complex or specialized bridges sometimes being bid out to consulting engineering firms.

=== Arkansas Highway Police ===
The oldest state law enforcement agency in Arkansas, the Arkansas Highway Police, is the Law Enforcement branch of ARDOT. Today, the Arkansas Highway Police is tasked with preserving and protecting the State and Federal Highways of Arkansas. The Highway Police is the second largest statewide law enforcement agency in Arkansas, behind only the Arkansas State Police, with whom they share concurrent jurisdiction. The main focuses of the Highway Police is Size and weight regulation, Motor Carrier Enforcement, Hazardous Material enforcement, and lately, drug interdiction. The Arkansas Highway Police also regulates and permits all oversize loads coming through Arkansas. The Highway Police operates a fleet of patrol units as well as a network of Weigh Stations positioned on major highways through the state.

== See also ==
- Arkansas Highways
- Arkansas Transit Association
- List of state highways in Arkansas
- United States Department of Transportation
