= Niagara Parks Police Service =

Police service for the Niagara Parks Commission in Canada

- Motto: Unity, Loyalty, Responsibility

Agency overview
- Formed: 1887

Jurisdictional structure
- Operations jurisdiction: Regional Municipality of Niagara, Ontario, Canada
- Governing body: Niagara Regional Police Services Board
- Constituting instrument: Community Safety and Policing Act, 2019 (S.O. 2019, c. 1, Sched. 1)
- General nature: Local civilian police

Operational structure
- Headquarters: 6075 Niagara Parkway, Niagara Falls, Ontario
- Special constables: 21
- Non-sworn members: 6-46
- Elected officer responsible: The Honourable Michael Kerzner, Solicitor General of Ontario
- Agency executive: Paul Forcier, Chief of Police
- Parent agency: Niagara Parks Commission

Website
- www.niagaraparks.com/aboutus/police.php

The Niagara Parks Police Service is a special constabulary maintained by the Niagara Parks Commission in Niagara Falls, Niagara-on-the-Lake and Fort Erie, Ontario, Canada. Established in 1887, the Niagara Parks Police Service has a unique status among Ontario special constabularies in that its members are armed and trained at the Ontario Police College. As special constables, Parks Police officers only have authority on or in relation to property owned by the Niagara Parks Commission, in contrast to municipal or provincial police officers, who have authority province-wide.

The Service is funded entirely by the Niagara Parks Commission, an agency of the provincial government, and operates with an annual budget of approximately $3.6 million.

Niagara Parks Police officers fall under the mandate of the Special Investigations Unit.

== History ==
The Niagara Parks Commission was established in 1885 and charged with maintaining the land and buildings immediately surrounding the Canadian side of the Horseshoe Falls. The Parks Police Service was established three years later, and initially consisted of two police officers. The Parks Police Service was originally incorporated and authorized as a police force, but at some point during the mid-20th century, it was reorganized as a special constabulary.

In 2010, the provincial government and Niagara Regional Police Services Board considered discontinuing the Parks Police Service, citing concerns about a lack of accountability for special constables. At the time, special constables were not under the jurisdiction of the province's Special Investigations Unit (SIU), meaning that Parks Police officers who fired their guns or were involved in interactions that ended in the death or serious injury of a suspect would be investigated by another police force rather than the civilian watchdog.

In 2019, the authority of the SIU was expanded to include "special constables employed by the Niagara Parks Commission."

Also in 2019, the Parks Commission fired then-Police Chief Mark McMullen after an internal HR investigation into a traffic stop the previous summer. Inspector Paul Forcier was subsequently appointed as his replacement.

In 2022, a Parks Police officer shot and killed a man armed with bear spray and an edged weapon. The subsequent SIU investigation found that the officer had acted in self-defence, and no charges were laid.

=== Police chiefs ===
There have been 15 chiefs of police throughout the Service's history. Paul Forcier is the present Chief of the Niagara Parks Police Service.

Chief	Tenure
William Bowman	1887–1904
James Wilcox	1904-1908
Joseph Vandersluys	1908-1913
J. Harrison Plow	1913-1920
John Jackson	1920-1924
Charles Atcherly	1924-1940
Cyril Bratley	1940-1957
Edwin Rehfeld	1957-1967
Wilfred J. Derbyshire	1967-1993
Raymond G. Vassallo	1993-2003
Timothy Berndt	2003-2008
Douglas Kane	2008-2013
Carl Scott	2013–2017
Mark McMullen	2017-2019
Paul Forcier	2019-

== Organization ==
=== Authority ===
Officers of Niagara Parks Police Service are appointed as special constables and have the full powers of a police officer to enforce the Criminal Code, the Niagara Parks Act, the Highway Traffic Act, the Controlled Drugs and Substances Act, the Trespass to Property Act, and the Liquor License Act on or in relation to the approximately 3274 acres of parkland and 56 kilometers of highway owned and operated by the Niagara Parks Commission. The Niagara Regional Police Service maintains jurisdictional authority over the entirety of the Niagara Region, including the Commission lands patrolled by the Parks Police. The special constables are appointed by the Niagara Regional Police Services Board with the approval of the Ministry of the Solicitor General, and the appointments must be renewed every five years.

=== Ranks ===
Title	Number	Type
Chief of Police	1	Special Constable
Inspector	1	Special Constable
Sergeant	4	Special Constable
Constable	21	Special Constable
Communications Officer	4 full-time	Dispatcher
Provincial Offences Officer	2 full-time, up to 40 seasonal	Provincial Offences Officer

=== Headquarters ===
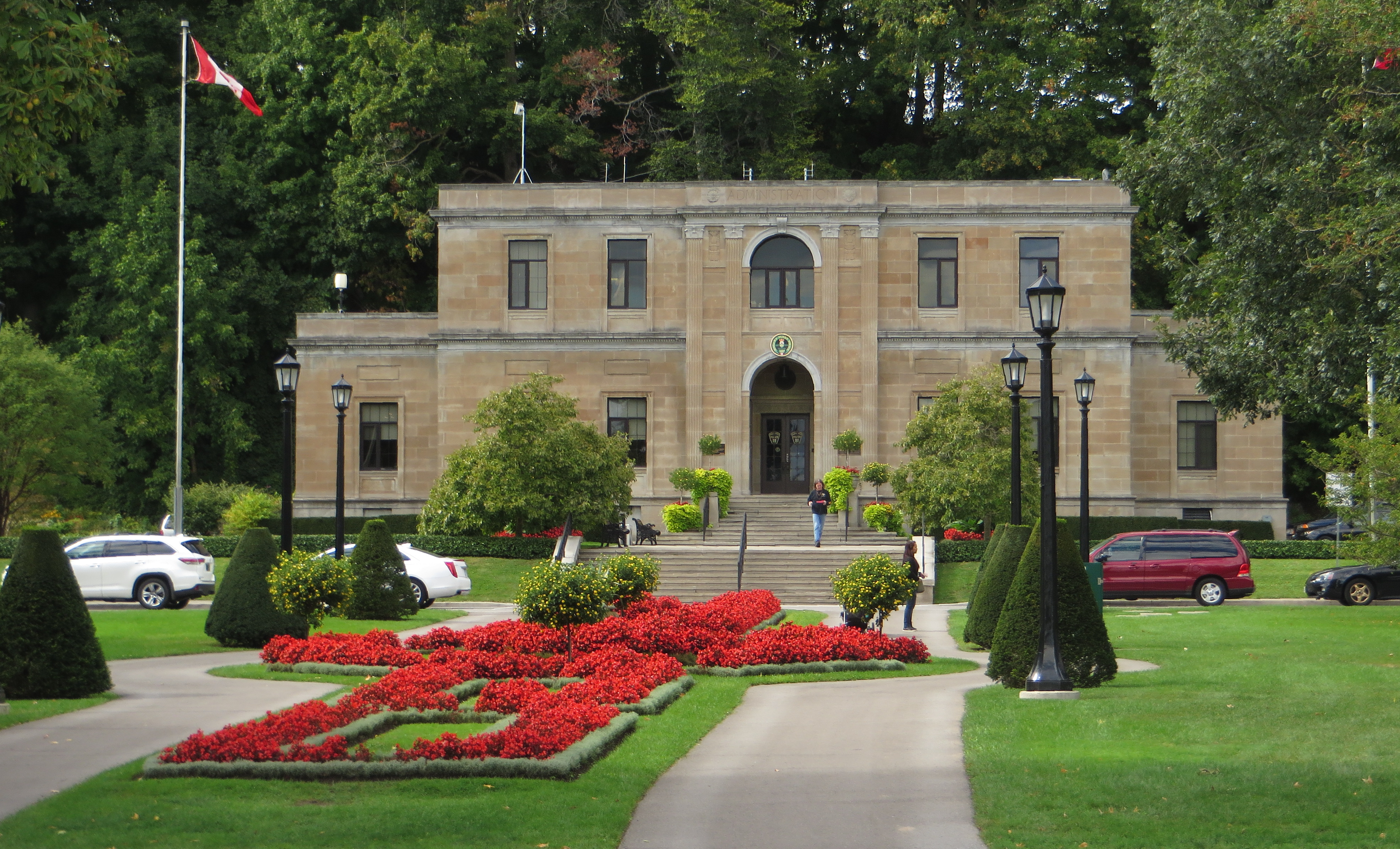
Niagara Parks Police headquarters.

The Niagara Parks Police Headquarters is located at 6075 Niagara Parkway, Niagara Falls, Ontario, directly across from the American Falls in the former Administrative Building of the Niagara Parks Commission.

=== Specialized units ===
The Niagara Parks Police Service employs three specialized units: the High Angle River Team (HART), a part-time unit which consists of officers specially trained in high angle rescue techniques; the Marine Unit, which patrols both the upper and lower Niagara Rivers alongside the Niagara Regional Police; and a Canine Unit consisting of one handler and a dog trained in search and rescue and explosives detection.

During the peak tourist season, nearly 40 students are employed as provincial offense officers and they are responsible for the orderly flow of traffic and parking offenses. These officers supplement 2 full-time provincial offenses officers who are employed year-round.

== Equipment ==
=== Uniforms ===
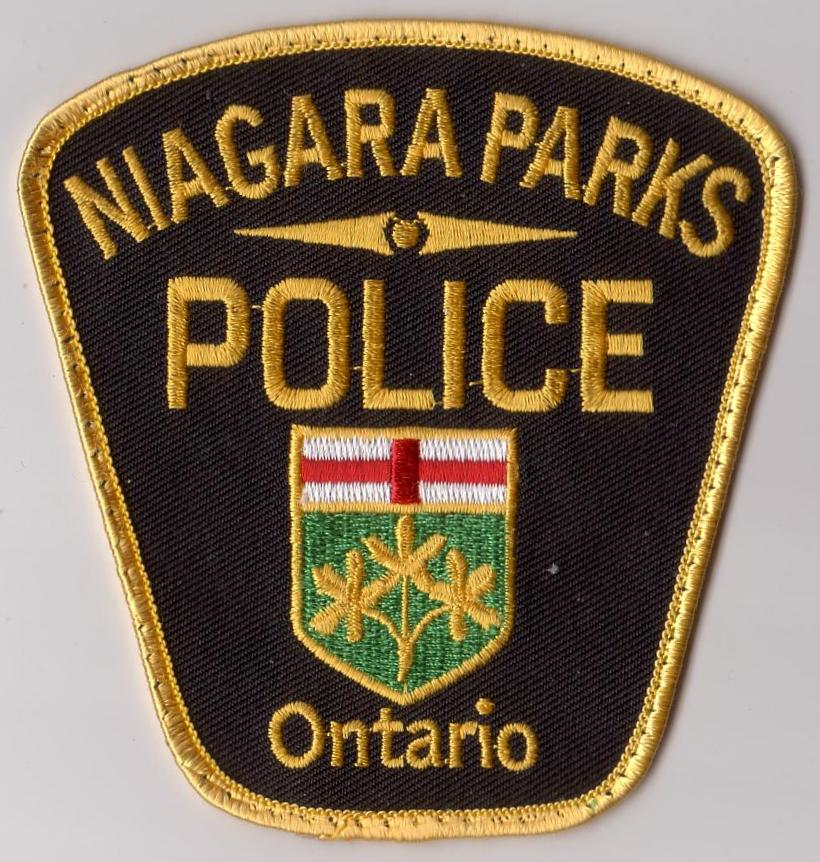
Niagara Parks Police Service shoulder flash worn by special constables.

Parks Police officers wear traditional police navy blue uniform shirts and cargo pants with red trouser piping, while provincial offenses officers wear baby blue uniform shirts. Special constables have the option to wear a peaked forage cap with a yellow band, and all members have ballcaps with the Service's crest. Members wear gold shoulder flashes that read "Parks Police," "Provincial Offences Officer," or "Communication Officer" based on their role.

=== Weapons ===
Despite their special constable status, Parks Police officers have the unique authority to carry firearms, pepper spray, and tasers. In addition to this equipment, officers carry handcuffs and telescopic batons. Seasonal provincial offenses officers are not trained or authorized to carry any form of weapon.

=== Fleet ===
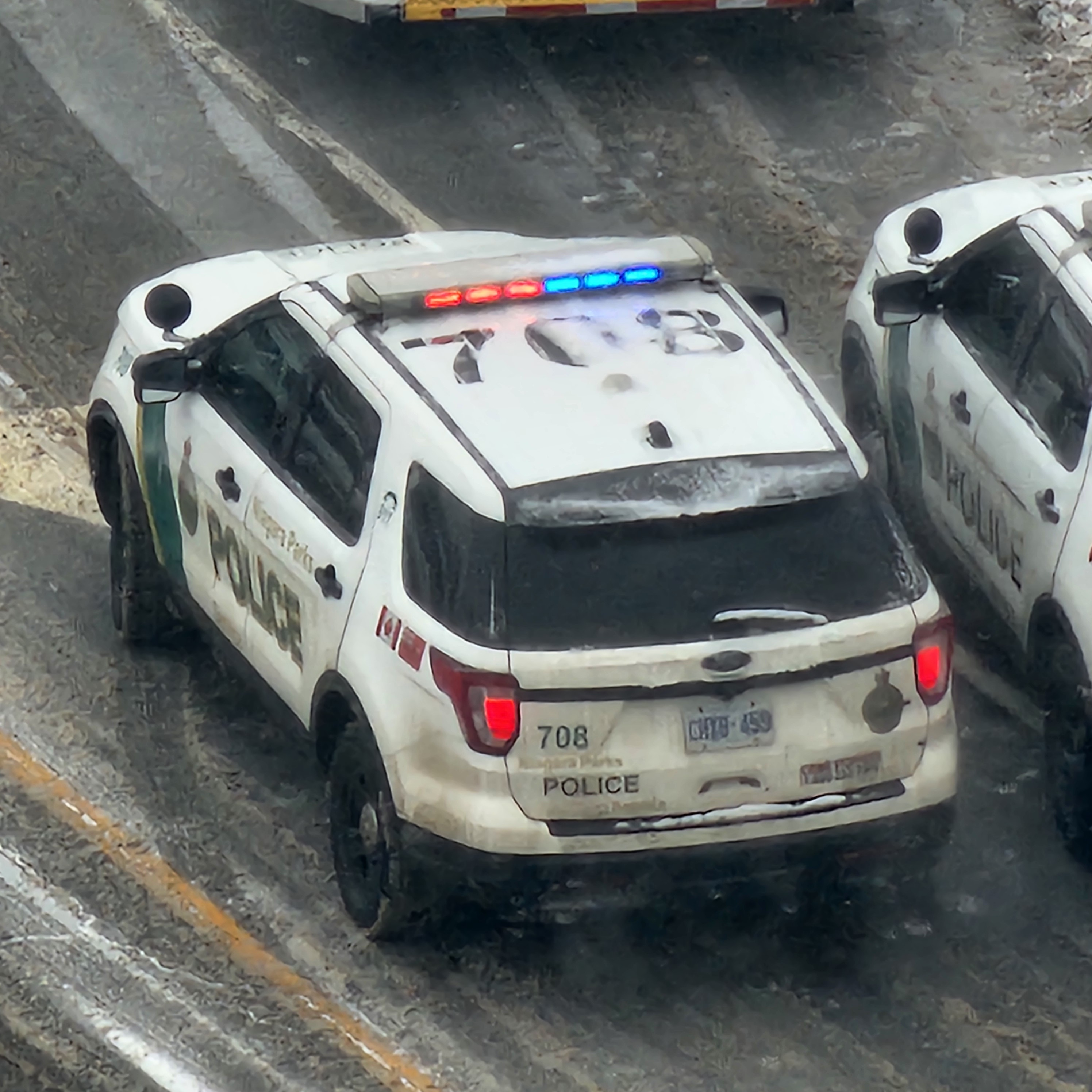
A Niagara Parks Police Interceptor.

The Niagara Parks Police Service uses the Ford Police Interceptor Utility as a primary patrol vehicle. The Service also has a fleet of Giant bicycles, a Chevy Silverado pickup truck used by the High Angle Rescue Team, and a Ford F150 pickup truck used by the Canine Unit.

== See also ==
- Niagara Regional Police Service
- New York State Park Police Niagara Region / Region 13
- Park police
- Special constabularies in Canada
