= Industrial violence =

Aspect of industrial relations

Industrial violence refers to acts of violence which occur within the context of industrial relations. These disputes can involve employers and employees, unions, employer organisations and the state. There is not a singular theory which can explain the conditions under which industrial conflicts become violent. However, there are a variety of partial explanations provided by theoretical frameworks on collective violence, social conflict and labor protest and militancy.

Violent industrial disputes have pre-dated the Industrial Revolution, and include multiple modern day examples, like the UK Miners Strike (1984–85). These disputes predominantly occur in the form of violent strikes opposing employers, and have had varying results in terms of subsequent legal change. Violent action taken against labor unions is also a form of industrial violence and multiple instances of this have occurred.

== Pre–Industrial Revolution ==
=== Ireland ===
In late 18th century Dublin, violent disputes often occurred between masters and journeymen. At this time, Dublin was the centre of economic growth for Ireland, which likely resulted in the high rate of crime (between 1708 and 1786, 173 homicides were reported). Laws against combinations had begun in the 16th century. By the 18th century they had become more numerous with increasingly severe punishments. 'Combinations' are almost equivalent to modern day strikes. However, they were generally more violent and usually resulted in physical injury or damage to property. In 1729 the first general law, 3 Geo. 2. c. 14 (I), against combinations passed, but proved to be ineffectual. By 1772, at least seven more had passed, reflecting both the futility of these laws and the rising organisational strength of artisans, journeymen and servants.

Three more anti-combination acts were passed in Ireland 1780, the Obstruction of Trade Act 1779 (19 & 20 Geo. 3. c. 19 (I)), as well as 19 & 20 Geo. 3. c. 20 (I) and 19 & 20 Geo. 3. c. 36 (I). Collectively, this is known as the Combination Act 1780. This law extended the death penalty to violent attacks on workshops, materials and tools. This legislation was in response to the crime and violence within the workplace due to the issue of labour supply. In attempting to reduce the supply of labour, combinators utilised several tactics. This included setting fire to factories, outright physical violence against apprentices, masters and innocent citizens, as well as posting anonymous letters including threats to masters. In June 1780, three tape and garter master's homes were attacked by a group of journeymen. Their windows were broken and shots were fired at their house. In April 1781, a sugar refinery on Hanbury Lane was set alight.

Industrial violence also arose from the military, police and an independent group known as The Volunteers which all supported the masters. This was an independent force seeking reforms within Ireland during the American War of Independence, but once they had acquired firearms some factions cooperated with the masters in upholding anti-combination laws.

== During the Industrial Revolution ==
=== Europe ===
Industrial violence often occurred during this period of industrialisation. David Snyder and William R. Kelly utilised Italian records of labour shortages to reveal over 6,000 labour disputes occurred between 1878 and 1903, with over 11% of these disputes being violent. This data includes violence which did not involve a collective like that of a strike, but rather instances like damage to a person of property which involved two to three workers. Whilst France offers a less comprehensive record, forty-five violent strikes were reported between 1890 and 1914.

A notable instance of industrial violence within this period was the Great Labour Unrest, which occurred between 1911 and 1914. The violence occurred both on behalf of the protesters and the states, and included riots, damage to property and infantrymen opening fire. Both the Liverpool General Transport Strike of 1911 and the Dublin Lockout 1913 are notable examples of the conflicts within this period. The Liverpool General Transport Strike centred around the strike of transport workers, which froze Liverpool commerce. On August 13, a crowd of 18,000 people rallied, and were subsequently baton charged by police, unprovoked. This was known as ‘Bloody Sunday’. Troops were deployed in support of the police, and a gunboat was stationed in the River Mersey. Hundreds were hospitalised, and two days later troops opened fire at the docks within the city, resulting in the death of two men and the injury of 13. However, these were not the only fatalities which occurred during this period of widespread industrial conflict. Four days following Bloody Sunday, two striking railwaymen were shot in South Wales by troops.

The Dublin Lockout resulted from the government at Westminster supporting Dublin employers attempts to dismantle the Irish Transport and General Workers Union (ITGWU). In response to William Martin Murphy, owner of the Independent Newspaper group and the Dublin United Tramway Company, victimising the ITGWU, the union called out its tram workers. However, Murphy had guaranteed support from the Liberal Government. This resulted in industrial violence when over 30th to the 31st of August, police clubbed workers off the streets. The charge began at Beresford Place, the headquarters of the ITGWU. According to the front-page report by Justice, the crowd which formed there retaliated by throwing stones, but incurred many casualties. This violence continued the following day, when Larkin, leader of the ITGWU, held a meeting (which had been banned). The paper stated 440 people received hospital treatment over the weekend. This display of support of employers by authorities led to Murphy and other employers locking out their employees, including those who were not a part of the union.

=== United States ===
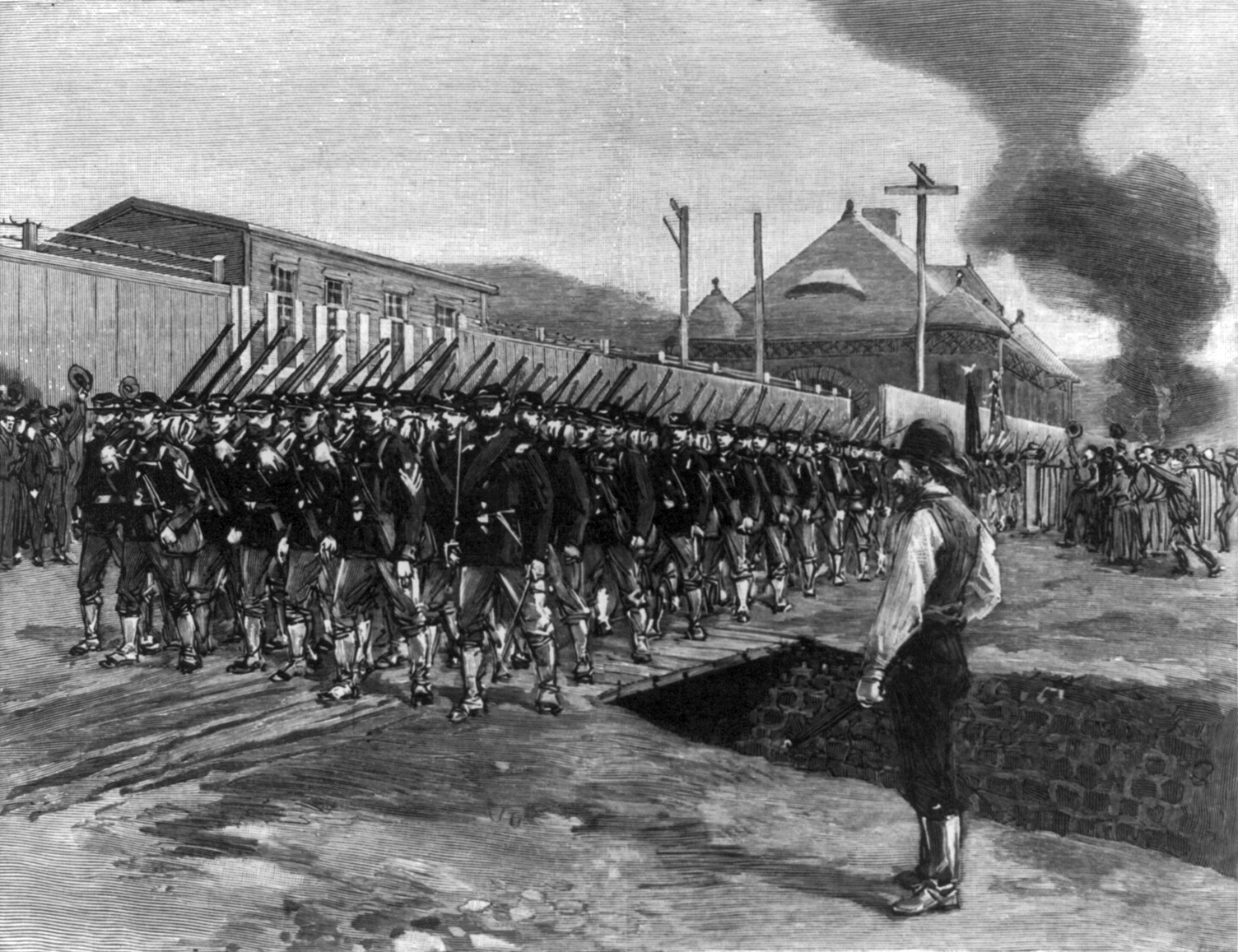
An illustration of troops arriving during the Homestead Strike

Between 1890 and 1914, there is a record of fifty violent strikes occurring within the U.S., twenty-two of which occurred between 1910 and 1913. One of the largest strikes of this era was the 1909–1910 Philadelphia General strike. The rights of workers to unionise was neither granted nor protected by statutory law prior to WWI. However, in common law labor organisations ceased to be viewed as illegal conspiracies as early as 1842, although some prosecutions were made as late as 1890. The Homestead Strike (1892) is one of the largest and most violent strikes which occurred within this era.

H.M Gitelman's research found labor violence was usually associated with issues other than union recognition. Before the legalisation of unionisation in 1933, the majority of worker initiated strike violence was against strikebreakers, and took the form of physical assault. This rarely went beyond roughhousing, asides from the violence which occurred within the mining industry. Shootings occurred most frequently in conjunction with mining, one of the most extreme examples being the events of the Herrin Massacre 1922.

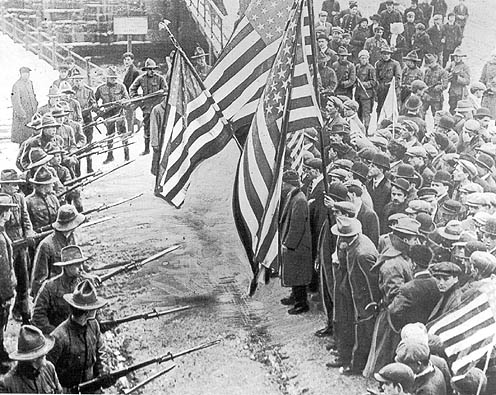
Militia facing bayonnets towards unarmed peaceful strikers during the Lawrence Textile strike, 1912

Armed forces were sometimes present at labor strikes, causing violence from provocation in some instances. However, in some cases police or other forms of armed forces assaulted civilians without provocation. This occurred at the Lawrence Textile Strike (1912) and at the Memorial Day massacre (1937). Although, Gitelman found the role and character of violence of state police and national guardsmen generally varied depending on the control elected officials enacted. On multiple occasions state troopers entered strikes as violent partisans of employers, like the events of the Ludlow Massacre 1914, which occurred during the Colorado Coalfield War, and the Bethlehem Steel Strike 1910. The strike against the wages and working conditions at Bethlehem Steel began on February 4, and lasted 108 days. The state police were called in response, and on February 24, they arrived at the mill. They used riot sticks and fired warning shots to disperse the strikers, and a striker was wounded in the leg. As the crowd entered the barroom for the Majestic Hotel to avoid the troopers, two shots were fired into the bar by Pennsylvania state constable John Moughan. One fatally wounded Joseph Szambo, and the other went through both cheeks of a man drinking a beer.

During WWI, unionisation was to be legalised through the Wilson administration’s wartime powers, but sanction was withdrawn by the end of the war. It wasn’t reinstated until the National Industry Recovery Act 1933.

=== Colonial India ===
Widespread unionisation occurred between 1918 and 1920 within India, although industrial violence persisted before and after this period. One large example of this is the South Indian Railway Strike 1928. This strike began with non-violent tactics, but the subsequent rioting ultimately led to multiple casualties and fatalities. In the 10 days of strike, railroad management reported 78 cases of obstruction and sabotage.

In 1862, the villagers of Urappanur in the Madurai district of the Madras protested against the diversion of water from a channel which irrigated their fields. When police attempted to bodily remove the workers from their sit-in, they began to pelt the police with stones. Moreover, there are multiple occasions where workers participated in food riots. For example, in 1876, railroad labourers' pay was in arrears, and grain prices were high. As traders refused to extend the workers by credit, the workers looted the bazaars in Cuddalore, South Arcot. In 1918, food riots and looting began in the rice growing areas of Krishna and Godavari rivers in May and reached the working class areas North of Madras City by September. During the looting and rioting that followed, cotton mill and rail workshop workers were major participants. However, after 1920 no major outbreaks of grain rioting occurred.

As there was a large population of workers in the railroad industry during the Madras presidency, multiple forms of violence and violent strikes occurred within the industry. "Train wrecking" was used before and after the prominence of organised unions throughout India. Generally it was either in an attempt to place pressure on management, or due to feelings of wrongful dismissal. In 1913, workers from the Madras and Southern Mahratta’s Railway Perambur workshops rioted in opposition to administrative changes. A new clocking in procedure was introduced, which shortened rest breaks and introduced lateness fines. Workmen refused to follow the procedure, and attacks on the European supervisory staff ensued. Those in the carpentry shops began to throw their mallets, bricks, nuts, bolts and iron bars at the staff. Some workers used sledgehammer handles to chase the Europeans, and proceeded to break windows and smash office furniture.

== After World War II ==
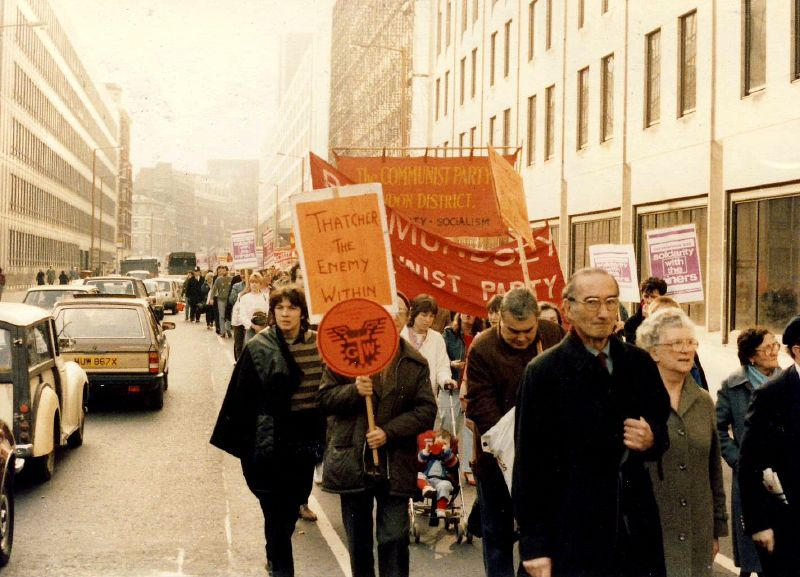
A Miners strike rally in London, 1984

=== United Kingdom ===
The Grunwick dispute saw frequent clashes between police and the mostly female, immigrant, East African Asian striking workers of the Grunwick Film Processing Laboratories. Police reportedly "kicked and punched the women who gathered, dragging some women by the hair as they were arrested" with a total of 550 arrests made.

The biggest industrial dispute in Post-War Britain was the UK Miners’ Strike (1984-1985), with 187,000 participants. Reports of the strike in Nottinghamshire involved throwing bricks and violent clashes with the police.

=== India ===
In February 1980, 3 workers were killed and 13 were injured in a conflict at Pramod Rubber Industries in Taloja. The poor wages led the workers to join the Maharashtra General Kamgar Union, and in October 1979 they issued the management a notice demanding an increase in wages and minimum statutory benefits. In response, an employee who had joined the union was dismissed and others were intimidated. Agitation and confrontations ensued between management and the employees, until the workers went on a strike. As 14 day notice had not been given, the management stated it was an illegal strike, and as the Commissioner of Labor agreed, the strikers tried to come back to work. However, the owner of the factory had hired new workers, and the old workers claim these recruits threatened, abused and stoned them. The workers had a temporary shelter erected outside the factory which was burnt down, whilst the products of the factory were escorted by police. On January 14, when two workers returning from a meeting passed the factory, they refused to tell the owner the events of the meeting. Consequently, one worker was fatally shot by the owner of a factory. As police refused to respond, protest ensued the following day, January 15. At this protest, the owner drove by and shot into the crowd, fatally wounding a worker in the crowd. A fire within the factory started afterwards. The two owners and 32 workers from the crowd were arrested.

In 2012, workers protested at Maruti Suzuki India in Manesar due to the suspension of a worker. These protests became violent; the human resources general manager Awanish Kumar died in the conflict, and several other managerial staff sustained injuries. Part of the factory was set on fire.
