= Saskatchewan Highway Patrol =

Canadian law enforcement agency

- Official SHP logo.
- Abbreviation: SHP

Agency overview
- Formed: 1 July 2018; (8 years, 311 days)
- Preceding agencies: Regional Logistics-Commercial Vehicle Enforcement (2011–18); Highway Transport Patrol (1982–2007)
- Annual budget: CAD$6,204,000 (2021–22)

Jurisdictional structure
- Operations jurisdiction: Saskatchewan, Canada
- Legal jurisdiction: Saskatchewan
- Governing body: Ministry of Corrections, Policing and Public Safety
- Constituting instrument: The Police Act, 1990
- General nature: Civilian police

Operational structure
- Headquarters: 2nd Floor, 1630 Park Street, Regina, SK, S4N 2G1
- Ministers responsible: Tim McLeod, minister; Denise Macza, deputy minister

The Saskatchewan Highway Patrol (SHP) is the highway patrol unit of the province of Saskatchewan, Canada. It regulates highway operations in compliance with the Commercial Vehicle Safety Alliance and the Canadian Council Motor Transport Administrators, and enforces federal, provincial and municipal statutes in relation to Saskatchewan's highways, including responding to 911 calls, accidents and events when a person commits an offence.

The SHP was previously known as the Highway Transport Patrol and Commercial Vehicle Enforcement until 1 July 2018.

== History ==
The SHP started in 1928 when the Public Utilities Board (PUB) was created by the Government of Saskatchewan. By 1934, the PUB had changed its name to the Highway Traffic Board (HTB). The first HTB investigators were hired by the provincial government in 1977. By 1982, the HTB was moved to the Department of Highways and Transportation, which led to the creation of the Highway Transport Patrol (HTP). In April 2011, the Ministry of Highways and Infrastructure (MHI) moved the HTP and the Investigations Unit (IU) into the Regional Services Division. The Transport Compliance Branch was renamed to the Regional Logistics-Commercial Vehicle Enforcement (CVE). In 2016, the functions of the CVE were centralized, with the HTP and the IU merged into it. In 2017, CVE officers were being recruited into the Protection and Response Team (PRT), which was completed by 2018.

On July 1, 2018, the CVE officially became the Saskatchewan Highway Patrol (SHP), transitioning into an armed law enforcement service with special constable powers; 40 officers from the CVE transferred to join the SHP. New officers received body cameras and firearms and defense tactics with training to tackle de-escalation, diversity awareness and mental health, and domestic violence. The Federation of Sovereign Indigenous Nations (FSIN) felt that having more officers being armed was excessive and would not help stable relations between the government and the Indigenous people in Saskatchewan. Six further recruits graduated in December 2018 and joined the SHP the following month; a further five graduated in November 2019. By December, the SHP had access to soft body armour and was seeking hard body armour for protection against rifle fire.

In June 2020, Saskatchewan provincial auditor Judy Ferguson released the results of an audit conducted in 2019. The report found that the agency had spent CAD$700,000 purchasing numerous firearms including three 9mm pistols, two fully automatic rifles, an AR-10 carbine, and 12 suppressors, all of which the SHP were not allowed to use under the Municipal Police Equipment Regulations. (Note: According to the audit report, the Municipal Police Equipment Regulations states that the following are allowed to be used by law enforcement agencies in Sasakatchewan: 40 S&W pistols, semi-automatic and AR-15-based carbines with factory loaded ammunition.) They had also bought them using a purchase card, a method which could not be used for purchases above CAD$10,000 under Treasury Board policies, and had locked them up as they could not be used. Other items purchased with the firearms include drug test kits, a high-powered riflescope, and one drone. Ferguson also found that the MHI did not sufficiently track items in their inventory or assign staff to account for the items purchased. For purchasing the firearms, the SHP's chief had been placed on administrative leave in July 2019 and fired that October; he sued in December for wrongful dismissal. In May 2021, the SHP was told that they would need to get permission from the MCPPS to purchase police equipment in the future on oversight grounds.

In April 2022, the Provincial Protective Services (PPS) was established, putting the SHP with Conservation Officer Service, Safer Communities and Neighbourhoods officers, Prisoner Transport and Court Security Deputy Sheriffs, and Wascana Park community safety officers. By the time of the MHI's Annual Report for 2022-23, the SHP had transferred to the Ministry of Corrections, Policing and Public Safety (MCPPS). In the latter's Business Plan for 2024-25, the ministry reported that around CAD$197,000 will be allocated for the SHP to create a Canine Unit to detect and seize contraband, including unstamped tobacco and/or controlled substances. The ministry subsequently announced a border security plan in January 2025 that would involve the PPS in securing the US-Canadian land border, which will involve SHP officers in patrols and public safety campaigns in interprovincial borders and parts of the land border.

== Organization ==
The SHP is a member of the PRT responsible for reducing rural crime throughout the province. (Note: The PRT, consisting of 258 officers, includes the SHP, Sakatchewan-based RCMP and municipal police services and Ministry of Environment Conservation Officers.) Any complaints launched against the SHP will be examined by the Public Complaints Commission (PCC).

=== Chiefs of SHP ===
Number	Name	Tenure	Note	Reference
1	Robin Litzenberger	2018-2019	Became chief of SHP after transitioning from CVE as the last director.	
2	Andrew Landers	2020-2022	Replaced Litzenberger after he was fired from his post.	

=== Chief Superintendents of SHP ===
Number	Name	Tenure	Note	Reference
1	Brendan Tuchscherer			

== See also ==
- British Columbia Commercial Vehicle Safety and Enforcement
