= Transportation of Dangerous Goods Act, 1992 =

Canadian goods regulation law

Parliament of Canada
- Long title: An Act to promote public safety in the transportation of dangerous goods
- Citation: S.C. 1992, c. 34
- Royal assent: June 23, 1992
- Status: In force

The Transportation of Dangerous Goods Act, 1992 (French: Loi de 1992 sur le transport des marchandises dangereuses) is a Canadian federal statute. Introduced in the 34th Canadian Parliament, and receiving royal assent on June 23, 1992, the act regulates the transportation of dangerous goods in the country.

The TGDA has an "Offences and Punishments" passage in which are detailed liabilities "on indictment to imprisonment for a term not exceeding two years", and that "Proceedings by way of summary conviction may be instituted at any time within, but not later than, five years after the day on which the subject matter of the proceedings arose." The TGDA falls under the control of the Minister of Transport.

The Hazardous Waste Manifest form is mandated by the TDGA.

== Dangerous Goods Safety Marks ==
=== Class 1, Explosives ===
Class 1 placards all have an orange background.

Class 1.1, 1.2, 1.3

Class 1.4

Class 1.5

Class 1.6

All placards under Class 1 have a placeholder for the product's compatibility group letter.

Class 1.1, 1.2, and 1.3 bear a black exploding bomb symbol and have placeholders for the product's division.

=== Class 2, Gases ===
Class 2 placards all bear various symbols and background colours.

Class 2.1

Class 2.2

Class 2.3

Oxidizing gases

Class 2.1, Flammable Gases, bears a black or white flame symbol on a red background.

Class 2.2, Non-flammable and Non-toxic Gases, bears a black or white gas cylinder symbol on a green background.

Class 2.3, Toxic Gases, bears a black skull and crossbones symbol on a white background.

When anhydrous ammonia (UN 1005) is transported, the container must display (in addition to the existing Class 2.3 placard and UN number) a special placard with the product name and the words "inhalation hazard" (French: dangereux par inhalation).

If a product is an oxidizing gas, a yellow placard with black text and a flaming 'O' symbol must be displayed.

=== Class 3, Flammable liquids ===
The Class 3 placard bears a black or white flame symbol on a red background.

Class 3

=== Class 4, Flammable solids ===
Class 4 placards all bear flame symbols with various backgrounds.

Class 4.1

Class 4.2

Class 4.3

Class 4.1, Flammable Solids, has a black symbol with a vertically striped red and white background.

Class 4.2, Substances Liable to Spontaneous Combustion, has a black symbol with the upper half of the placard having a white background and the lower half with a red background.

Class 4.3, Water-reactive Substances, has a black or white symbol with a blue background.

=== Class 5, Oxidizing substances and organic peroxides ===
Class 5 placards all bear various symbols and background colours.

Class 5.1

Class 5.2

Class 5.1, Oxidizing Substances, bears a black flaming 'O' symbol on a yellow background.

Class 5.2, Organic Peroxides, bears a black or white flame symbol with the upper half of the placard having a red background and the lower half with a yellow background.

=== Class 6, Toxic and infectious substances ===
Class 6 placards all bear various symbols on a white background.

Class 6.1

Class 6.2 placard

Class 6.2 label

=== Class 7, Radioactive materials ===
Class 7 placard

Class 7 label

Class 7, Category I

Class 7, Category II

Class 7, Category III

=== Class 8, Corrosives ===
Class 8

=== Class 9, Miscellaneous products ===
Class 9

Lithium batteries

=== Other placards & signs ===
Danger placard

Fumigation sign
