= Provost marshal =

Title for a leader of military police

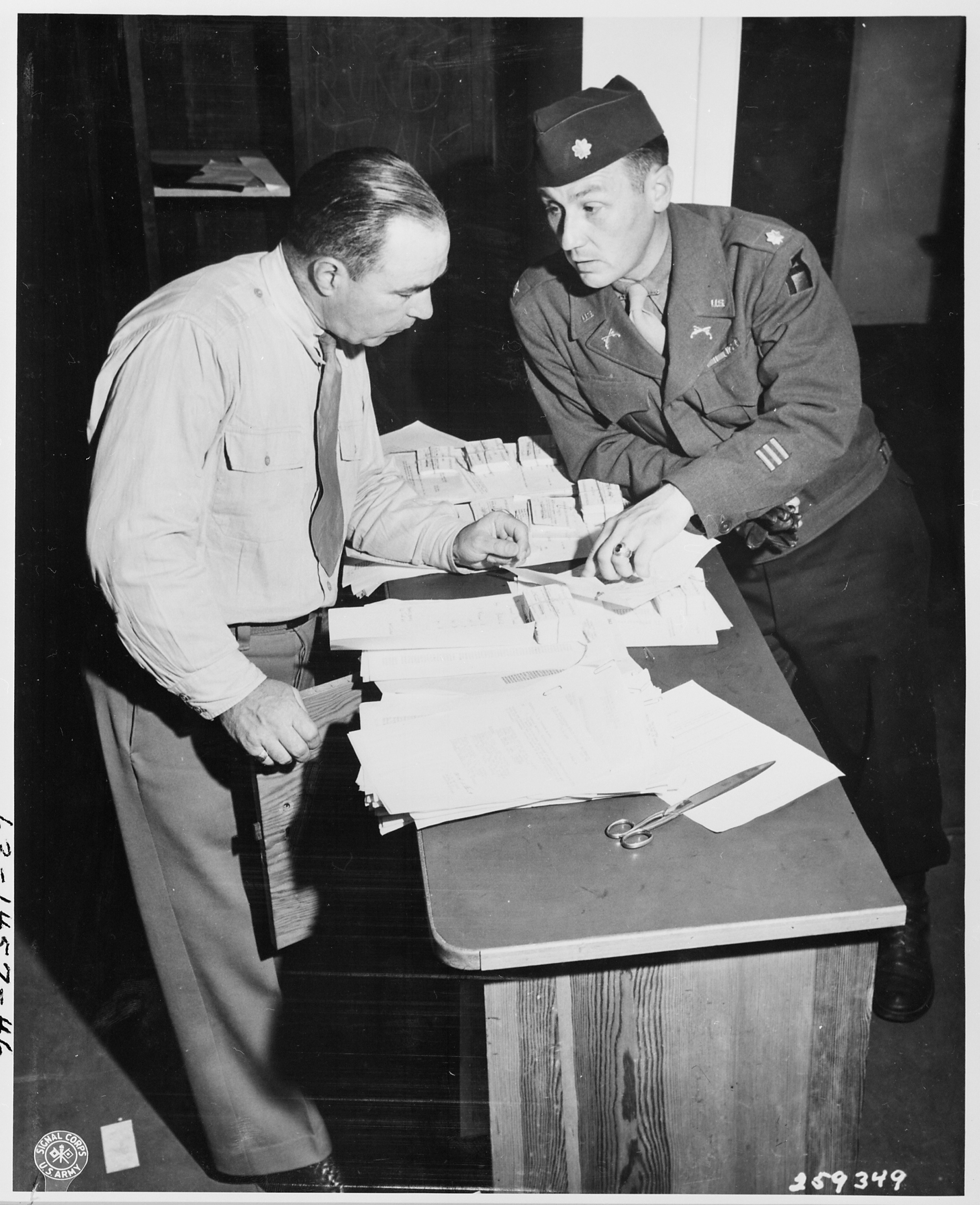
Lieutenant Colonel James P. Smith, Jr., provost marshal of the Berlin District, left, and Major William J. E. Keish, commanding officer, 713th Military Police Battalion, check pass-lists for the Potsdam Conference area in Potsdam, Germany on July 14, 1945

A provost marshal (/ˌproʊvoʊ ˈmɑːʃl/) commands a group of military police (MPs). The title originated with an older term for MPs, provosts, from the Old French prévost (Modern French prévôt), meaning "person placed in charge" (literally "positioned at the front"). While a provost marshal is now usually a senior commissioned officer, the title can apply to a person of any rank who commands any number of MPs; historically, civilian officials could become provost mashalls, especially under conditions of martial law, or when a military force had day-to-day responsibility for some or all aspects of civilian law-enforcement (such as in some British colonies). A provost marshal may also oversee security services, imprisonment, fire/emergency services and ambulances.

== British Armed Forces ==
In the British Armed Forces, the provost marshal is the head of the military police of each service, with the senior military police officers at lower levels being titled deputy or assistant provost marshals. In many cases the provost marshal is in charge of discipline. Provost Marshal is the oldest extant appointment in the British Army. It dates back to early Tudor times but the office was probably in existence in the 12th century. By the end of the 17th Century each regiment had its own provost marshal under the Provost Marshal General. Currently, the provost marshal (army) is also the commander of the 1st Military Police Brigade.

== Canadian Armed Forces ==
The Canadian Forces Provost Marshal (CFPM) is the branch advisor for the Canadian Forces Military Police Branch, and also the Commander of the Canadian Forces Military Police Group (CF MP Gp). The CFPM is headquartered in Ottawa and has five sections, each under the command of a Deputy Provost Marshal (DPM): DPM Police, DPM Resource Management, DPM Individual Training and Education, DPM Security, and DPM Professional Standards.

The CF MP Gp is composed of the Canadian Forces National Investigation Service (CFNIS), Military Police Security Services (MPSS), Canadian Forces Service Prison and Detention Barracks (CFSPDB), and Canadian Forces Military Police Academy (CFMPA).

== German Armed Forces ==
The chief of the German Military Police (Feldjäger) is called General der Feldjägertruppe (equivalent to provost marshal general). The German Armed Forces (Bundeswehr) do not have a specific title for military police officers so in most tactical units and especially in multinational deployments, they will use the English term "provost marshal".

== New Zealand Defence Force ==
The provost marshal of the Joint Military Police Unit holds a senior commissioned rank. Currently a colonel holds the provost marshal position for the NZDF.

The provost marshal is responsible for all three military police units from the Navy, Army and Air Force.

== United States Armed Forces ==
In the United States Army and United States Marine Corps (USMC), the senior-most military law enforcement officer is the Provost Marshal General (PMG) (Army) or provost marshal (USMC). The US Army PMG is a post that was reinstated in 2003, having been abolished 29 years earlier. The PMG is a general in charge of the United States Army Military Police Corps, U.S. Army Criminal Investigation Division (CID) and United States Army Corrections Command (ACC) policy and procedures from the Office of the Provost Marshal General (OPMG) at The Pentagon.

The senior MP officer at the theater, corps, division, and brigade level and for each garrison is known as a provost marshal. In many US Army garrisons, a provost marshal is at times also responsible for the provision of fire and physical security as well as law enforcement services and thus is also referred to as the Director of Emergency Services (DES).

== Other uses ==
The British far-right group Britain First also use the rank, presumably as head of their paramilitary wing 'Britain First Defence Force', with provision for two "provosts marshal" in their official group constitution.

== In popular culture ==
- In the 1988 film The Presidio, Sean Connery portrays Lt. Colonel Alan Caldwell, the base provost marshal.

== See also ==
- Provost (civil)
- Provost Sergeant
