= CFPM =

CFPM is an abbreviation which can refer to:

- Canadian Forces Provost Marshal
- cubic foot per minute - cubic foot flow rate
