= Canadian Forces Military Police =

Branch of the Canadian Armed Forces

Canadian Forces Military Police Police militaire des Forces canadiennes
- Cap badge of the CFMP

- Operational patrol dress shoulder patch
- Abbreviation: CFMP / MP
- Motto: Disciplinare per exemplum (Latin for 'To discipline by example')

Agency overview
- Formed: 1917 (original); February 1, 1968 (current CFMP)
- Employees: 2,231 (including Reserve members)

Jurisdictional structure
- Federal agency (Operations jurisdiction): Canada
- Operations jurisdiction: Canada
- Legal jurisdiction: Department of National Defence establishments; property and personnel subject to the Code of Service Discipline (regardless of geographical location); and anyone, anything and anywhere if a military nexus exists
- Constituting instruments: Canadian Forces Military Police Group Orders; National Defence Act; King's Regulations and Orders for the Canadian Forces; Criminal Code
- General nature: Federal law enforcement; Military provost

Operational structure
- Headquarters: Ottawa, Ontario
- Elected officer responsible: David McGuinty, Minister of National Defence
- Agency executive: BGen Vanessa Hanrahan, Canadian Forces Provost Marshal
- Parent agency: Canadian Armed Forces and Department of National Defence
- Official branch march: "Thunderbird"

The Canadian Forces Military Police Group (CFMP; French: Groupe de la Police militaire des Forces canadiennes) provides police, security and operational support services to the Canadian Armed Forces (CAF) and the Department of National Defence (DND) worldwide.

== About ==
CFMP serves the Canadian Armed Forces (CAF) community, which includes Regular and Reserve Force members, DND civilian employees, cadets, and family members residing on military establishments in Canada and abroad. Whether at home on CAF bases or abroad on international missions, CFMP, in conjunction with civilian and allied military police forces, protect and support all components of the CAF. As of 2024-2025, the CFMP has an actual trained strength of approximately 1,121 Regular Force and 335 Primary Reserve members.

The international scope of the CAF requires that CFMP provide services in Canada and around the world. All Canadian citizens are entitled to the same rights, privileges and protection under Canadian law, and CFMP are qualified to provide these services to the same standard as every other Canadian police service. CFMP routinely function within the civilian criminal and military justice systems.

CFMP are classified as Peace Officers in the Criminal Code, which gives them the same powers as civilian law enforcement personnel to enforce Acts of Parliament anywhere. They have the power to arrest anyone who is subject to the Code of Service Discipline (CSD), regardless of position or rank under the National Defence Act (NDA). CFMP have the power to arrest and charge non-CSD bound civilians only in cases where a crime is committed on or in relation to DND property or assets, or at the request of the Minister of Public Safety, Commissioner of the Correctional Service of Canada or Commissioner of the Royal Canadian Mounted Police (RCMP). Although CFMP jurisdiction is only on DND property across Canada and throughout the world, any civilian accessing these areas falls under CFMP jurisdiction and is dealt with in the same manner as by any civilian policing agency. If in fact a crime is committed on or in relation to DND property or assets, CFMP have the power to arrest and charge the offender, military or civilian, under the Criminal Code. The purpose of the CFMP is not to replace the job of a civilian police officer, but rather to support the CF through security and policing services. CFMP also have the power to enforce the Provincial Highway Traffic Act on all military bases in Canada pursuant to the Government Property Traffic Regulations (GPTR).

== History ==
The Canadian Military Police Branch can trace its roots to the formation of the Canadian Military Police Corps (CMPC), which was authorized on September 15, 1917, by Militia General Orders 93 & 94. The initial establishment was set at 30 officers and 820 warrant officers and NCOs within 13 detachments, designated No. 1 through No. 13.

Only trained soldiers were to be selected, and they were required to serve a one-month probationary period before being transferred. Applicants were required to have exemplary service records. The CMPC School was formed at CFB Rockcliffe near Ottawa in June 1918. The first commanding officer of the school was Major Baron Osborne. The basic course was of three weeks duration. Upon successful completion of the course, privates were promoted to lance corporal. The CMPC was disbanded on June 30, 1920. The Canadian Provost Corps (C Pro C) was formed on June 15, 1940, under the authority of Privy Council Order 67/3030. It originally consisted of No.1 Company (RCMP) and No. 2 Provost Company which was formed in early 1940 as part of the 2nd Canadian Infantry Division.

The Royal Air Force, Canada (RAFC) was formed in 1918 and an assistant provost marshal was appointed in Toronto on February 1 of that year. Initially, there were approximately 30 Royal Air Force NCOs and airmen on his staff. This number was soon increased to 50, and two officers were appointed as deputy assistant provost marshals. The Royal Canadian Air Force Police had its beginnings in March 1940 when Group Captain M.M. Sisley was appointed as the first provost marshal of the RCAF. Originally called the Guards and Discipline Branch, the name was changed a year later to the Directorate of Provost and Security Services (DPSS). The DPSS was subdivided into two branches: Police and Security. These branches supplied gate and perimeter security for airfields and installations, and conducted disciplinary patrols. During the Second World War, RCAF Police were known as RCAF Service Police (SP).

After World War II, but before the unification of the Royal Canadian Navy (RCN), the Canadian Army and the Royal Canadian Air Force (RCAF), the security and police functions were conducted quite differently by the three services. The army divided the responsibility for security and security incidents between the Canadian Intelligence Corps (C Int C) and C Pro C, and field inquiries were conducted by the Security Sections of the C Int C. The police functions of the C Pro C involved the provision and supervision of guards, the operation of service detention barracks and investigation of service and criminal offences. The Air Force Police (AFP) had the dual responsibility of performing both police and security duties and were under the command of the base on which they served.

Security in the RCN was the responsibility of the assistant director naval intelligence who reported to the director of naval headquarters. With the exception of a very small group of professionals policing Canada's military, since 1917 security officers, naval security officers were primarily intelligence officers or officers assigned security duties as a secondary responsibility. The navy had no police organization comparable to the C Pro C or the AFP but relied upon dockyard police, the Corps of Commissionaires, local civil police and shore patrols to maintain security of establishments and maintenance of discipline. Field inquiries in support of the security program were conducted by the RCMP.

The initial amalgamation of all police and security elements of the CF was first effected in October 1964 by the formation of the Directorate of Security at Canadian Forces Headquarters. With the introduction of the forces' functional command structure in April 1966, the security staffs and PMs in existing single-service command organizations were eliminated, the command and base security officers were appointed at the newly formed HQs, and the various investigative elements of the services were amalgamated into a single organization called the Special Investigation Unit (SIU). To achieve a common approach throughout the forces, security and police functions were regrouped into three main categories: (1) personnel security, (2) police and custody, and (3) security of information and materiel. A single trade of Military Police was created which replaced five trades that previously existed and provided standards for the training required of all non-commissioned members employed in the police and security field. In June 1966, Major General Gilles Turcot was directed to examine the role, organization and responsibility for security in the CF and to make recommendations for any revisions.

At the time of the Turcot report, there existed two philosophies in the police, intelligence and security organizations. The director general intelligence (DGI) saw a distinction between police and security but with a closer relationship between security and intelligence. The chief of personnel saw the police and security functions as complementary. The Turcot report, completed on 22 July 1966, directed that the responsibility for security should be placed under the DGI. In January 1967, the chief of the defence staff (CDS) directed DGI to undertake a management analysis with a view to recommending the future management system for intelligence, security and military police in the Canadian Armed Forces.

This study became known as the Piquet report. The DGI Working Group submitted its study in March 1967 in which it was concluded that security/intelligence/police should be managed as an entity under a Directorate General Intelligence and Security in the Vice Chief of the Defence Staff (VCDS) Branch. The new branch was to be named the Security Branch, which officially was created on 1 February 1968. The recommendations of the Piquet Study were implemented by the CDS on 3 May 1967 and by 1968, the officer specifications were in draft form and included five sub-classifications: military police, investigation, intelligence, imagery interpretation and interrogation. With the formation of a unified branch came a need to replace the previous corps and service badges and the use of the thunderbird as the symbol for the Security Branch arose out of the recommendations of the Insignia Steering Group appointed by DGI on 15 May 1967. In 1970, the branch unofficially deleted the military police sub-classification at the officer level since the basic officer specifications included all the tasks of the sub-classification. In effect, the branch had adopted a four subclassification structure. Therefore, between 1971 and 1974, the new Security Services Basic Officer course was the branch qualifying course and consisted of 84 days devoted to police/security instruction and three days to Intelligence subjects.

In June 1975, the director military occupational structures (DMOS) issued a draft occupational analysis report on the Sec 81 classification in which it was found that the activities performed by Sec(Int) officers bore little resemblance to those performed by Sec(MP) officers. The branch was restructured into two classifications vice the five sub-classifications that existed at the time. By August 1975 after another review, DGIS rejected the idea of two separate classifications within one Security Branch and proposed one classification for police and one for intelligence. After 1976, training and employment of Security Branch Officers was in consonance with the dual structure of the branch and proved superior to the pre-1975 approaches. The dual structure also formalized and clearly defined the uniqueness of the police and intelligence functions and institutionalized the security function in the police side of the structure as had been the RCAF practice. In 1978, the Craven Report, proposed that ADM(PER) separate the CF police and intelligence personnel comprising the unified Security Branch and reorganize them independently into a structured Security Branch and a new Intelligence Branch. Following further studies, discussions and recommendations, DGIS concurred with the Craven Report and on 3 December 1981 the CDS directed that separate Security and Intelligence Branches each containing the applicable officer classification and trade be established, with an implementation target date of 1 October 1982. On 29 October 1982, a ceremony was held at the Canadian Forces School of Intelligence and Security (CFSIS) which inaugurated the new Intelligence Branch and rededicated the Security Branch.

Following the recommendations in the report by former Chief Justice Brian Dickson, a new era was inaugurated for the Military Police Branch with the creation of the Canadian Forces National Investigation Service (CFNIS), the Canadian Forces National Counter Intelligence Unit (CFNCIU) and the re-establishment of the Canadian Forces Provost Marshal (CFPM).

As of 2012, members of the Military Police Branch serve on every base and station of the Canadian Forces in Canada, as well as with the various regiments and battalions. CFMP also serve at Royal Military College of Canada, JTF 2, Joint Task Force (North) and as air marshals for Code 1 (PM Canada, HEGG and Royal Family) when travelling outside Canada. CFMP continue to serve in support of deployed operations, with a significant presence in TF Afghanistan. Outside Canada locations also include the NATO E3A component in Geilenkirchen, Germany, 45 embassies and high commissions with the Military Police Security Service (MPSS), CFSU Europe and Supreme Headquarters Allied Powers Europe in Casteau, Belgium.

In November 2007 a ceremony officially recognized the CFPM assuming command of the Canadian Forces Military Police Group. This new CF Formation comprises the CFNIS, MPSS, Canadian Forces Service Prison and Detention Barracks (CFSPDB) and Canadian Forces Military Police Academy (CFMPA).

On April 1, 2011, the CF MP Gp was restructured to a new establishment, with the environmental and operational commands policing assets now under the full command of the CF MP Gp Commander. The MPSS and the CFSPDB became part of the MP Svcs Gp, while the CFNIS and CFMPA remain directly under the CF MP Gp structure.

As of 2012, the Military Police Branch comprises approximately 2,230 members total, inclusive of Reserve members.

== Training ==
The first stage of training for candidates is the 10-week Basic Military Qualification (BMQ) course at the Canadian Forces Leadership and Recruit School in St-Jean-sur-Richelieu, Quebec. This training provides the basic core skills and knowledge common to all trades. A goal of this course is to ensure that all recruits maintain the CF physical fitness standard; as a result, the training is physically demanding. BMQ covers the following topics: policies and regulations of the CF, CF drill, dress and deportment (the "three Ds"), basic safety, first aid, personal survival in nuclear, biological and chemical conditions, handling and firing personal weapons, cross-country navigation and personal survival in field conditions.

Upon successful completion of BMQ, candidates go to a Military Training Centre for the Soldier Qualification (SQ) course, which lasts 20 training days. SQ covers the following topics: Army physical fitness, dismounted offensive and defensive operations, reconnaissance patrolling, advanced weapons-handling (working with grenades, machine-guns and anti-tank weapons) and individual field-craft.

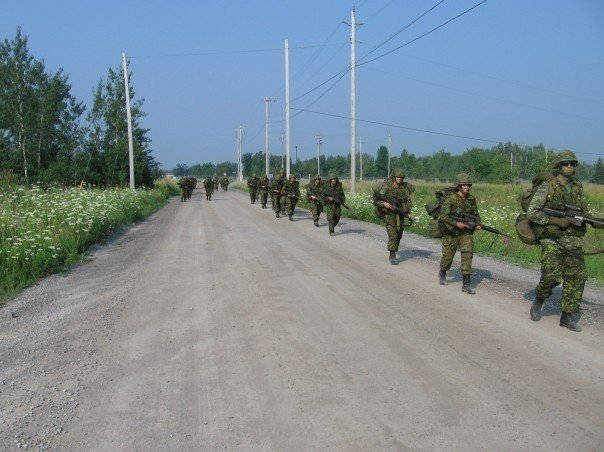

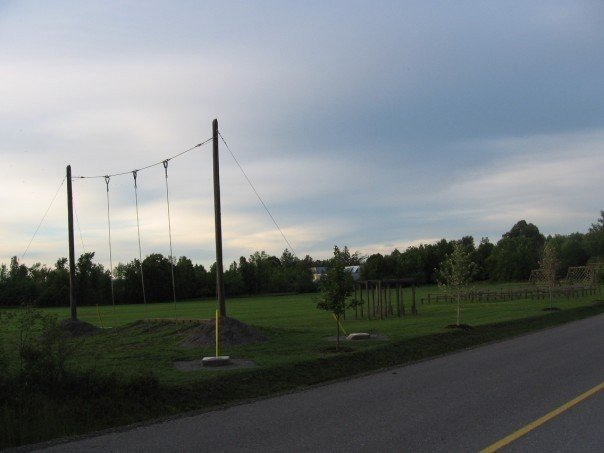

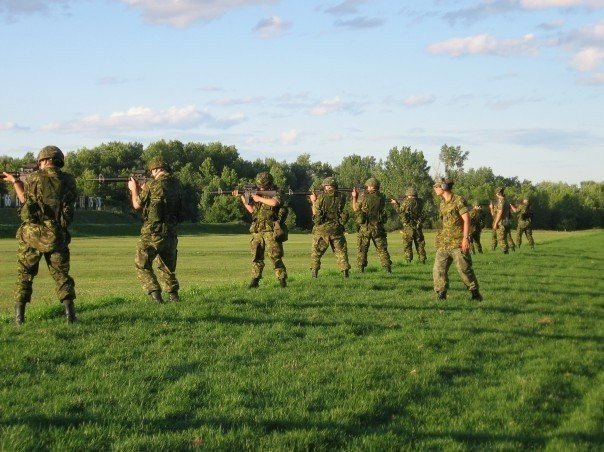

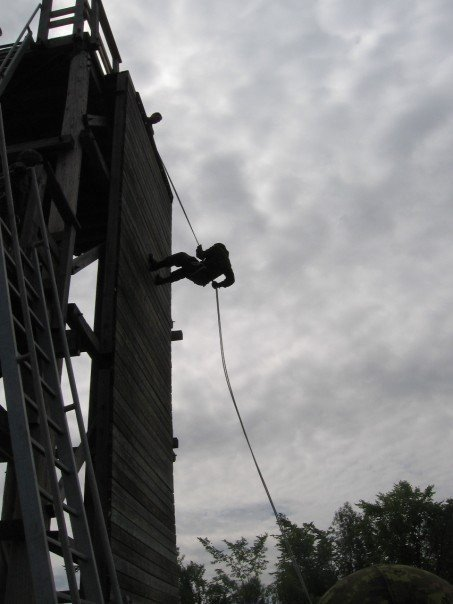

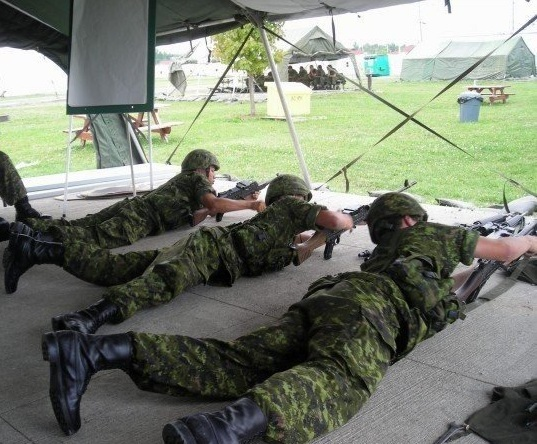

After successful completion of the BMQ and SQ courses, candidates will attend Basic Military Police Training at the Canadian Forces Military Police Academy (CFMPA). Over a four-and-half-month period, they will learn the basics of Canadian civilian and military law, investigative techniques, and acquire skills necessary to perform daily Military Police functions.

As CFMP progress through their careers, they will continually attend training for career and specialty courses at the CFMPA as well as partake in training with other Canadian and US Law Enforcement agencies.

=== Canadian Forces Military Police Academy ===
During 1968, the Provost Corps School was renamed the Canadian Forces School of Intelligence and Security (CFSIS). On 1 April 1999, the CFSIS was stood down. The Intelligence Training Company was re-formed as the Canadian Forces School of Military Intelligence (CFSMI), at CFB Kingston.

CFMPA was established 1 April 1999 when the Intelligence Training Company was detached from the former CFSIS. At this time the unit was transformed into a distinct Military Police/Security training establishment.

The Military Police component was reorganized to form the CFMPA and is located at CFB Borden. CFMPA provides career and specialist training to Regular and Reserve Force members of the Military Police Branch. In addition, CFMPA provides security-related training to non-Branch personnel of the Regular and Reserve Forces. CFMPA also provides training to personnel from other government and law enforcement agencies and to foreign nationals under the Military Training Assistance Program.

In 2004 Managing Authority for CFMPA was transferred from Canadian Forces Training Systems Group to the CFPM, who now exercises full control of Career and Out of Service Training for the Military Police.

A new, state of the art training facility, was completed in fall 2015. The CFMPA officially moved into the Col James Riley Stone Building, also at CFB Borden, on 16 October 2015 and began delivering training in this new facility on 21 October 2015.

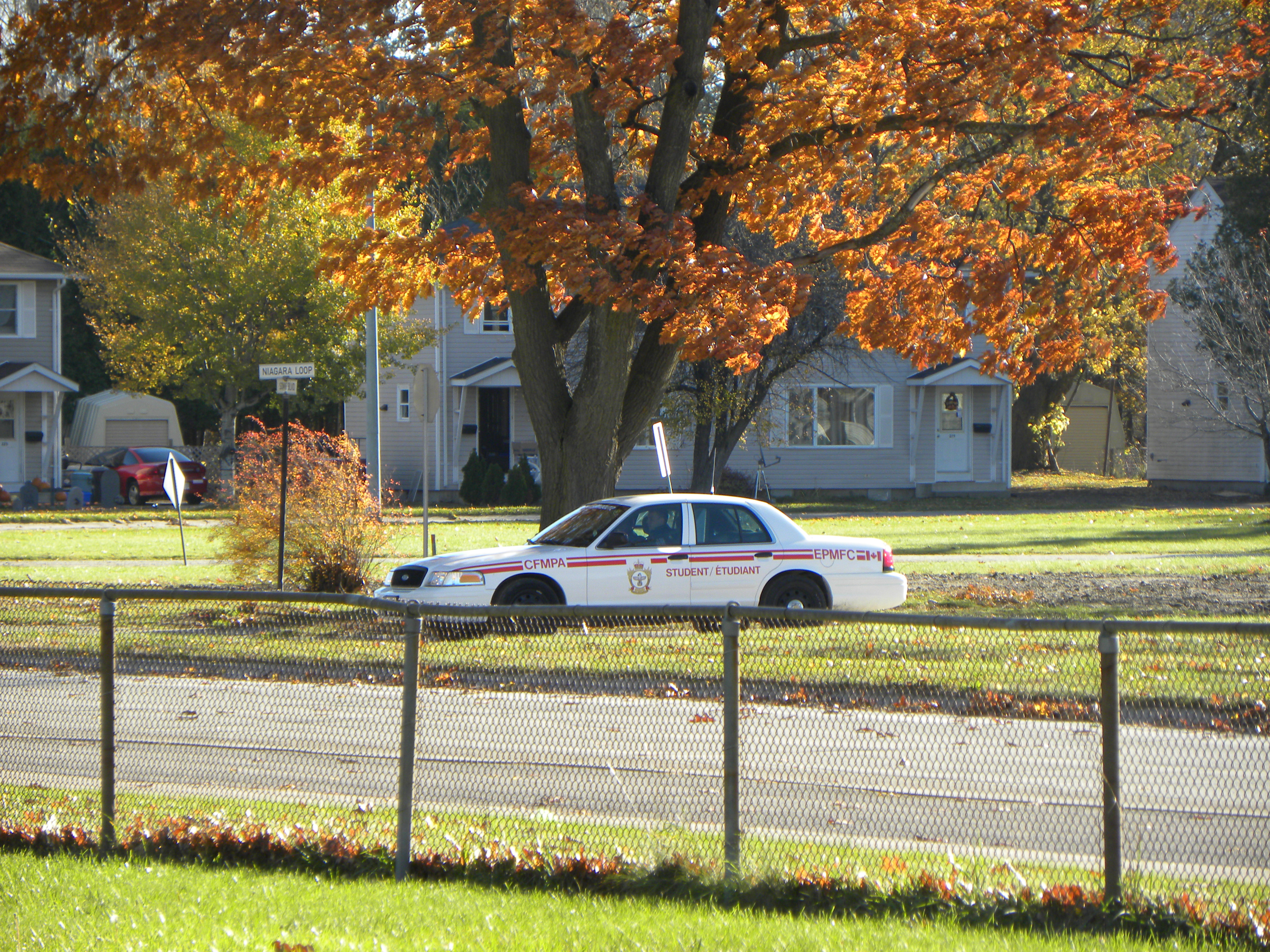
CFMPA Patrol Training

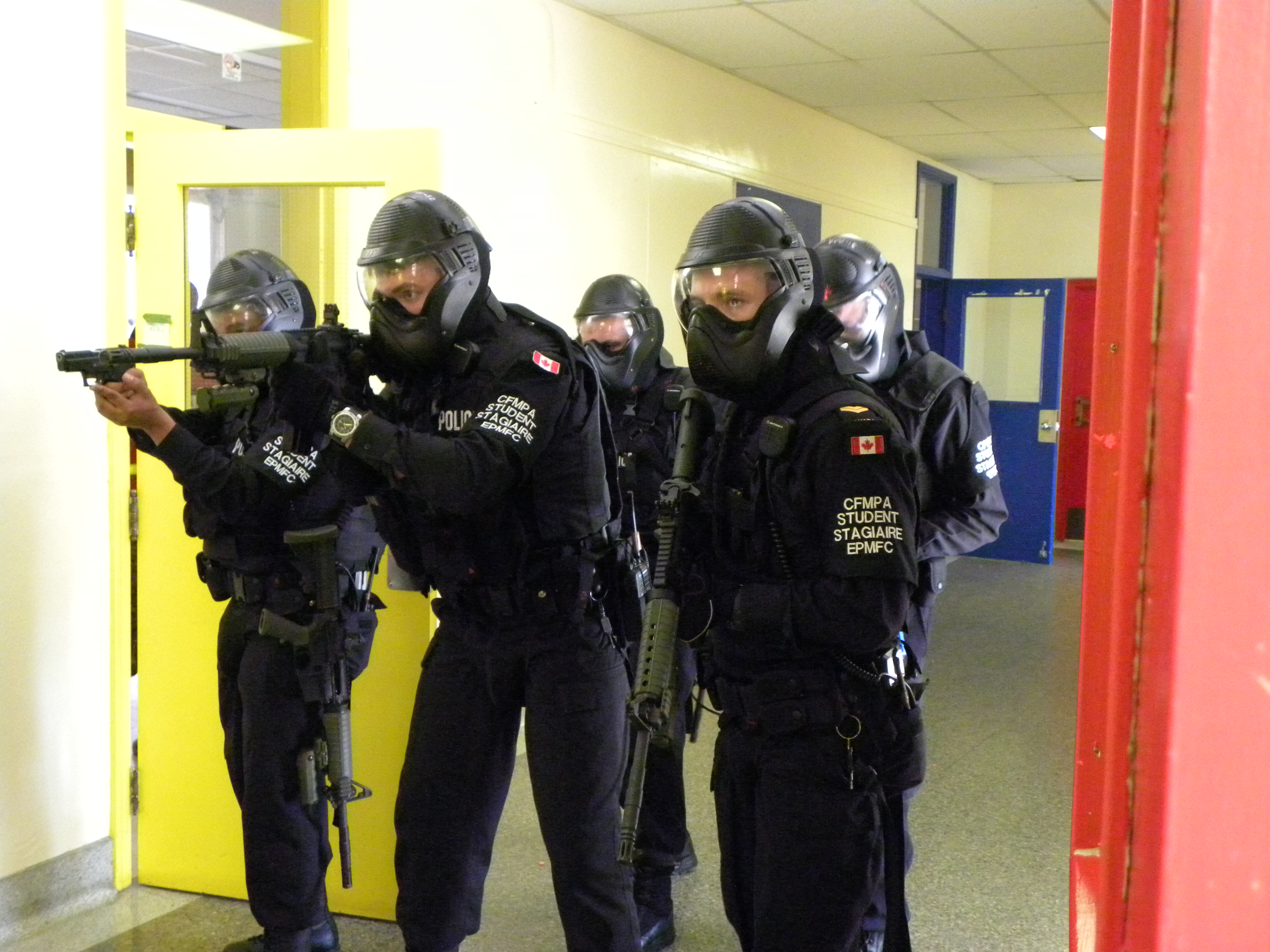
CFMPA IARD Training

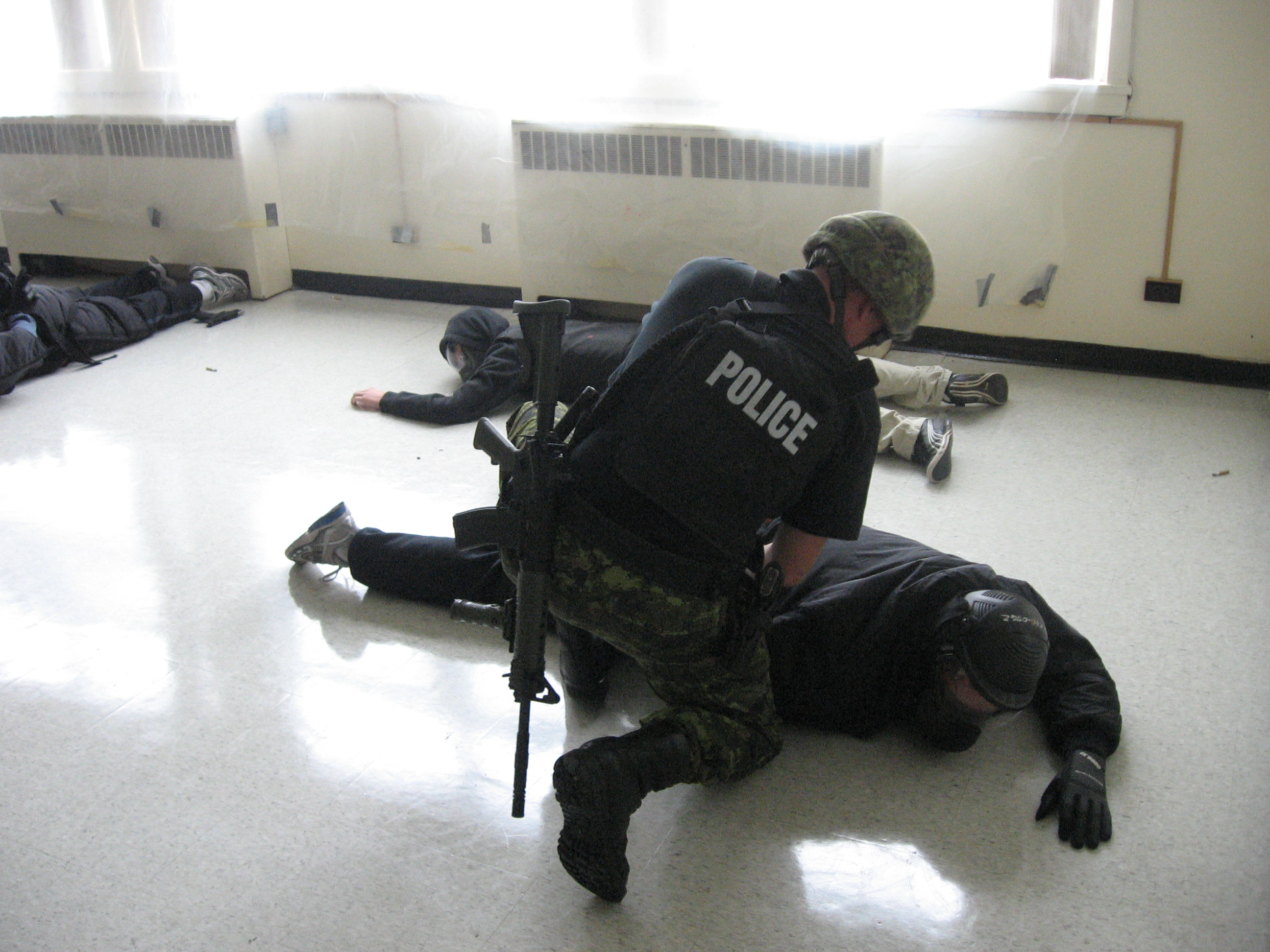
CFMPA IARD Training

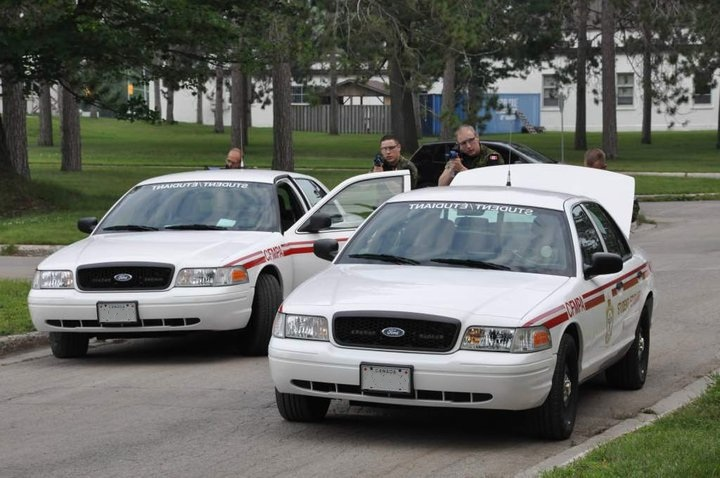
CFMPA IARD Training

== Operations and deployments ==
The Canadian Forces Military Police serve in policing and security roles on every base and station of the Canadian Forces in Canada, as well as with the various regiments and battalions. CFMP continue to serve with United Nations (UN) forces, as part of the NATO component in Geilenkirchen, Germany, and in 45 Canadian Embassies and High Commissions around the world.

Specific tasks of CFMP may include:

- Supporting CF missions around the world, by providing policing and operational support
- Enforcing provincial and federal laws and regulations on DND establishments
- Investigating and reporting incidents involving military and/or criminal offences
- Performing other policing duties, such as traffic control, traffic-accident investigation, emergency response, and liaison with Canadian, allied and other foreign police forces
- Developing and applying crime prevention measures to protect military communities against criminal acts
- Coordinating tasks related to persons held in custody (including military detainees and prisoners of war)
- Providing security at selected Canadian embassies around the world
- Providing service to the community through conflict mediation, negotiation, dispute resolution, public relations and victim assistance

=== Afghanistan ===
Members of the Canadian Forces Military Police were involved in the International Security Assistance Force (ISAF), a NATO-led formation that operated in Afghanistan under the authority of the UN. The Canadian Forces' contribution to ISAF was conducted under Operation Attention, and through this operation, CFMP members were primarily based in Kabul, Afghanistan, where they were employed across the city in a variety of training and advisory roles. CFMP members were also stationed with the Canadian Contingent Training Mission – Afghanistan (CCTM-A) Military Police Element, where they were responsible for enforcing Canadian law among the CF personnel and assisting other military police of different nations in enforcing conduct and discipline.

Under Operation Athena, CFMP members were stationed with Task Force Kandahar for the Operational Mentor and Liaison Team (OMLT), Operational Mentor and Advisory Teams (OMATs) and the Police Operational Mentor and Liaison Team (P-OMLT). CFMP also had a unit supporting Task Force Afghanistan.

Canada's Engagement in Afghanistan Official Website – Canada's New Role in Afghanistan – 2011 to 2014

Canada's Engagement in Afghanistan Official Website – Canada's Military and Police Training Role in Afghanistan: 2011-2014

== Organization structure ==
The CFMP operate many units across Canada. Most of the units are "total force" meaning they employ both regular force and primary reserve members of the CF. All units are under the control of the Canadian Forces Military Police Group (CF MP Gp), headquartered in Ottawa, Ontario.

In September 2026, the Canadian Forces Military Police Group was reorganized into a new structure that focused on regional headquarters and detachments. This resulted in the disbandment of the previous Army Military Police Group (A MP Gp), Naval Military Police Group (N MP Gp), and Air Force Military Police Group (AF MP Gp), removing the need for the Military Police Branch to focus its effort on element-specific command structures. It also saw the renaming of Primary Reserve units from the title of Military Police to Provost. The organization was separated into four operational groups—Military Police Unit Western Region (MPU WR), Military Police Unit Central Region (MPU CR), Military Police Unit Eastern Region (MPU ER), and the Military Police Operational Support Group (MP OSG), each of which consist of an traditional Army structure.

=== Military Police Unit Western Region ===
The Military Police Unit Western Region is responsible for law enforcement operations in western Canada, headquartered at CFB Edmonton, Alberta.

- Esquimalt Military Police Company
  - Esquimalt Military Police Detachment
  - Comox Military Police Detachment
- Edmonton Military Police Company
  - Edmonton Military Police Detachment
  - Suffield Military Police Detachment
  - Cold Lake Military Police Detachment
  - Yellowknife Military Police Detachment
- Winnipeg Military Police Company
  - Winnipeg Military Police Detachment
  - Shilo Military Police Detachment
  - Wainwright Military Police Detachment
  - Moose Jaw Military Police Detachment
  - Dundurn Military Police Detachment

=== Military Police Unit Central Region ===
The Military Police Unit Central Region is responsible for law enforcement operations in central Canada, headquartered in Ottawa.

- Trenton Military Police Company
  - Borden Military Police Detachment
  - Trenton Military Police Detachment
  - Kingston Military Police Detachment
  - Meaford Military Police Detachment
  - Toronto Military Police Detachment
- Petawawa Military Police Company
  - Petawawa Military Police Detachment
  - Ottawa Military Police Detachment
  - North Bay Military Police Detachment

=== Military Police Unit Eastern Region ===
The Military Police Unit Eastern Region is responsible for law enforcement operations in eastern Canada, headquartered in Montreal.

- Valcartier Military Police Company
  - Valcartier Military Police Detachment
  - St-Jean Military Police Detachment
  - Bagotville Military Police Detachment
  - Goose Bay Military Police Detachment
- Halifax Military Police Company
  - Halifax Military Police Detachment
  - Gagetown Military Police Detachment
  - Greenwood Military Police Detachment
  - Gander Military Police Detachment
  - St John's Military Police Detachment

=== Military Police Operational Support Group ===
The Military Police Police Operational Support Group contains all military police units that are not involved in frontline law enforcement. This includes line regiments and specialized units.

- 1 Military Police Regiment
  - 1 Military Police Platoon (Regular Force)—Edmonton, Alberta
  - 10 Provost Company (Reserve Force)
    - 11 Provost Platoon—Calgary, Alberta
    - 12 Provost Platoon—Vancouver and Victoria, British Columbia
    - 13 Provost Platoon—Winnipeg, Manitoba
- 2 Military Police Regiment
  - 2 Military Police Platoon (Regular Force)—Petawawa, Ontario
  - 20 Provost Company (Reserve Force)
    - 21 Provost Platoon—London, Ontario
    - 22 Provost Platoon—Toronto, Ontario
    - 23 Provost Platoon—Ottawa, Ontario
- 5 Military Police Regiment
  - 5 Military Police Platoon (Regular Force)—Valcartier, Quebec
  - 30 Provost Company (Reserve Force)
    - 31 Provost Platoon—Halifax, Nova Scotia
    - 32 Provost Platoon—Moncton, New Brunswick
- Canadian Forces Protective Service Unit
  - Aircraft Security Officer Flight
  - Close Protection Platoon
- Military Police Security Service
- Special Operations Forces Military Police Unit
  - Ottawa Detachment
  - Petawawa Detachment
  - Trenton Detachment
- Canadian Forces Service Prison & Detention Barracks

== Other detachments and specialty units ==
=== Special Operations Forces Military Police Unit ===
The SOF MPU provides policing services to the Canadian Special Operations Forces Command (CANSOFCOM).

=== Military Police Services Group ===
The Military Police Services Group (MP Svcs Gp) provides MP operational support to Canadian Forces operations, domestic, continental or expeditionary. The formation comprises a HQ in Ottawa, and three subordinate units: the CF Close Protection Unit (CFCPU), the Military Police Security Service (MPSS), and the CF Service Prison and Detention Barracks (CFSPDB).

Canadian Forces Protective Services Unit

The CFPSU is a high-readiness, specialized and expert protective service organization capable of conducting a broad range of special protective missions and tasks at home and abroad in support of the DND and CF mission. The CFPSU HQ is in Ottawa.

Military Police Security Service

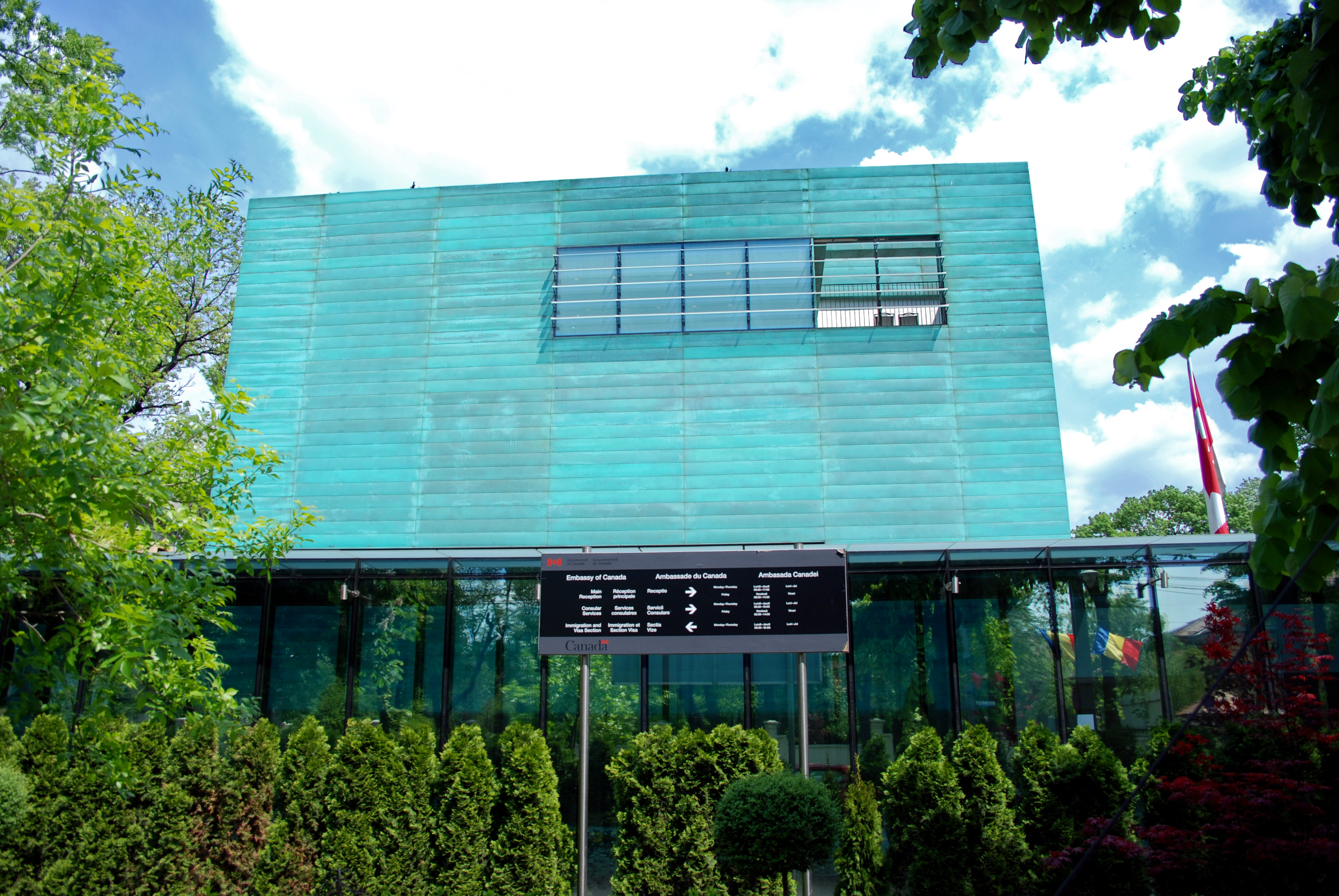
Embassy of Canada, Bucharest

The MPSS is as a unit of the MP Svcs Gp seconded to the Department of Foreign Affairs and International Trade (DFAIT). The role of the MPSS is to provide security services to specific Canadian Foreign Missions and related properties under the direction of the appropriate Head of Mission. These services include protection of classified and administratively controlled material and equipment, Canadian personnel and property. The performance of these duties includes the execution of instructions for the protection of Canadian Foreign Service Missions and their personnel in emergencies.

The MPSS employs over a hundred military police personnel. The MPSS personnel are at the unit headquarters, in Ottawa, and at 47 Canadian embassies, high commissions, or consulates around the world.

The first embassy to employ MP personnel as Military Security Guards was Beirut, Lebanon, in 1976. The Military Security Guard Unit (MSGU) was declared an official unit of the CF in 1990, and was officially renamed the MPSS in 2009.

CF Service Prison and Detention Barracks

Originally established as one of several military detention centres, the CFSPDB, at CFB Edmonton, is now the sole, permanently established military corrections facility remaining in the CF. The roles of the CFSPDB include: provide imprisonment and detention services for Canadian Forces service detainees, service prisoners and service convicts; to adjust detainees and prisoners to service discipline, and prepare them to resume an effective role in the CF; to return prisoners to civilian life, where appropriate, with improved attitude and motivation; and to provide subject matter expertise and guidance in support of Canadian Forces disciplinary programs and deployed prisoner of war/detainee operations.

Inmates at the CFSPDB serve sentences that range from 15 to 90 days of detention, to sentences of imprisonment up to two years less a day. Inmates serving a sentence of 14 days' detention, or less, may serve their sentence at a local Unit Detention Room.

==== Canadian Forces National Counter-Intelligence Unit ====
CFNCIU unit badge

The CFNCIU is responsible to provide security intelligence (SI) and counter intelligence (CI) services in support of the CF and the DND during peace, crisis and war. The mission of the CFNCIU consists of identifying, investigating and countering threats to the security of the CF and the DND from foreign intelligence services, or from individuals and groups engaged of espionage, sabotage, subversion, terrorism, extremism or criminal activities. The CFNCIU is a national-level specialist unit responsible for the provision of CI (specifically counter-HUMINT) services to the CF and the DND. In addition, the CFNCIU is responsible for the Defensive Security Briefing and Debriefing Program. This program provides knowledge and assistance to assist CF and DND members in protecting themselves and the department from potential threats involved in foreign travel, either for duty or non-duty travel, or who may have contact with foreign nationals.

The CFNCIU contains both military police and intelligence operators and liaise often with the Canadian Security Intelligence Service (CSIS), the Royal Canadian Mounted Police (RCMP) and provincial and municipal police service intelligence officers when gathering and sharing information.

==== Canadian Forces National Investigation Service ====
The Canadian Forces National Investigation Service (CFNIS) investigates serious or sensitive service and criminal offences against property, persons, and the Department of National Defence. It performs a function similar to that of a major crime unit of the RCMP or large municipal police agency.

==== 1 Canadian Air Division aircraft security officers ====
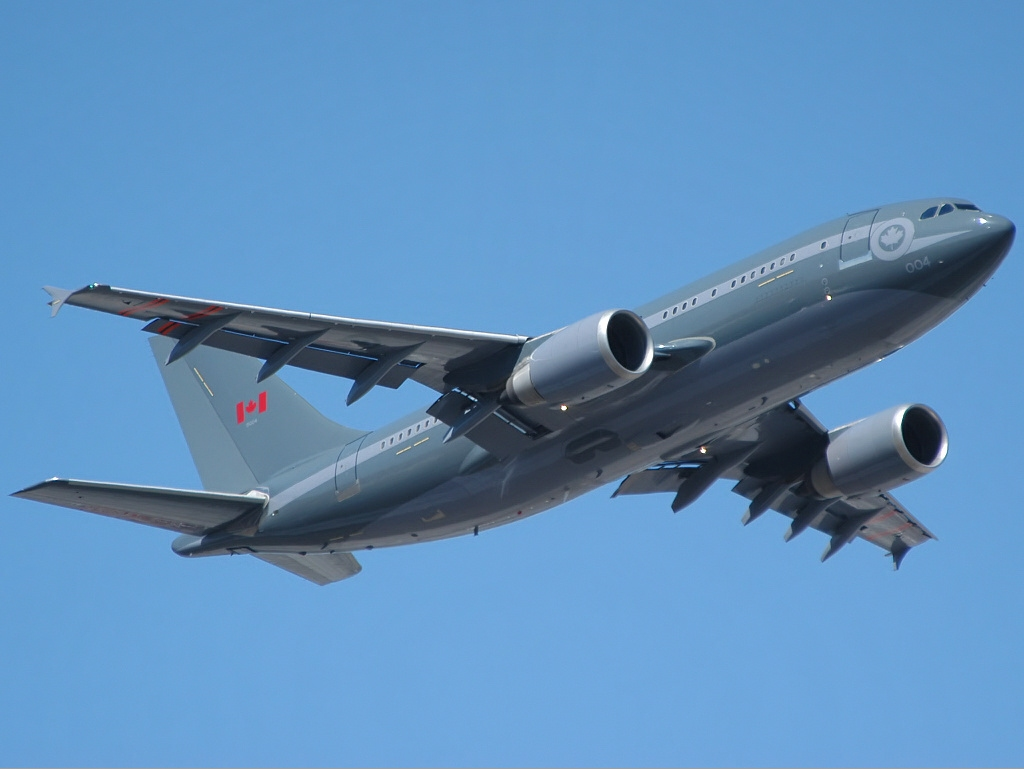
CF CC-150

Military police members of the 1 Canadian Air Division aircraft security officers are responsible for providing security to Canadian Forces aircraft, crew and passengers—passengers who may include the governor general, the prime minister and members of the royal family, amongst others.

==== Other detachments ====
The Canadian Forces Military Police also operate detachments at the following units:

- Canadian Forces Support Unit (Europe)
- Royal Military College of Canada – CFB Kingston
- CFSRSHQ Det Augsburg, Germany
- CFNA HQ Yellowknife
- Supreme Headquarters Allied Powers Europe – Casteau, Belgium

== Fleet and equipment ==
CFMP patrol vehicles are painted white with two red stripes and with a police logo. CFMP Reserve and regular field units have trucks painted olive green that say "Military Police Militaire" and have red or red and blue lights. Because of the terrain on certain bases, some units also have bicycles, all-terrain vehicles (ATV), snowmobiles and watercraft.

Aiming to be more readily identifiable, in 2022 the CFPM patrol vehicles underwent a redesign. The modernized design moved away from using a military crest as the only identifier on patrol vehicles. In keeping with Military Police traditions, the new look maintained the red colour with black and white tones, and included bilingual messaging which is visible day or night. Upon introduction, the new design won second place in the 2023 Annual Best Dressed Police Vehicle Award from Blue Line, the only program of its kind in Canada.

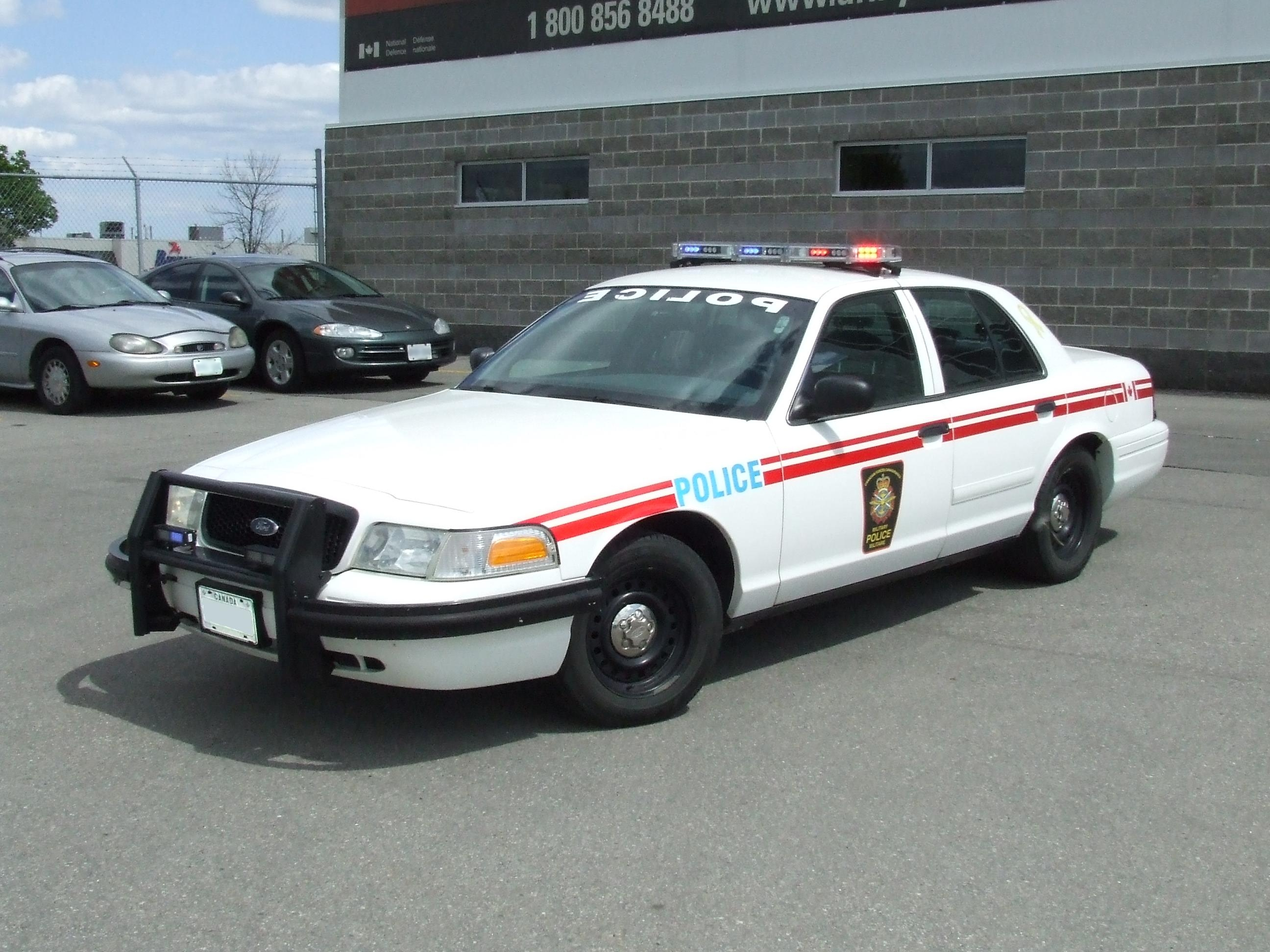
MP Patrol Cruiser (Crown Victoria)

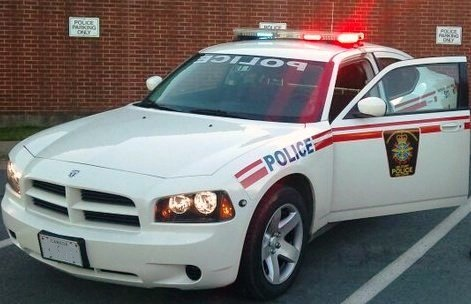
MP Patrol Cruiser (Dodge Charger)

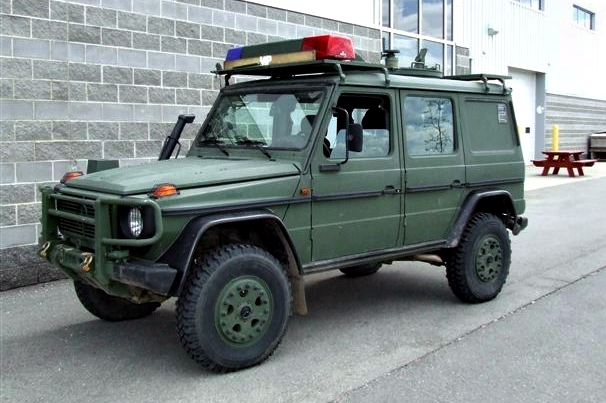
MP G-Wagen

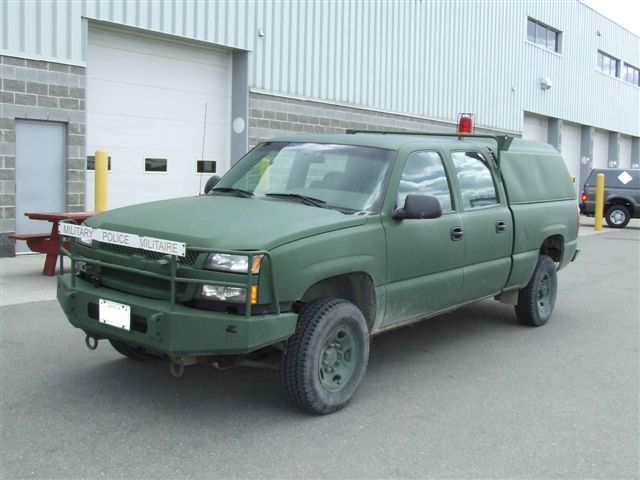
MP MilCOTS

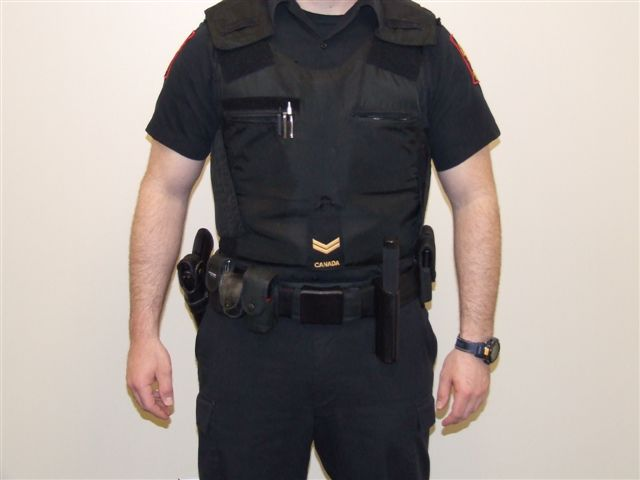
MP operational patrol uniform

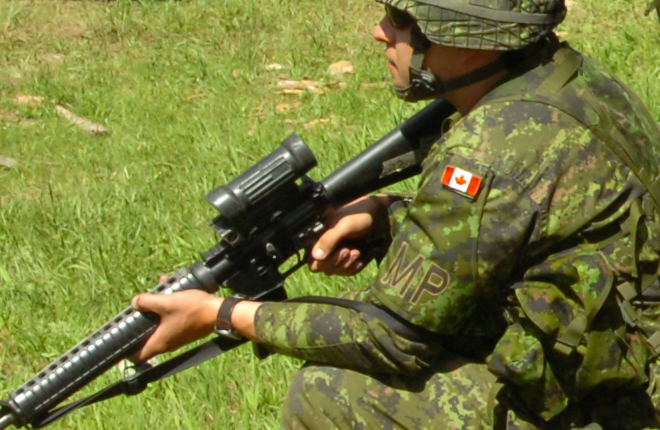
Canadian Forces Military Police field uniform

Model	Type	Number	Dates	Manufacturer	Details
Ford Taurus (sixth generation)	Patrol Cruiser		2013–Present	Ford	
Ford Crown Victoria	Patrol Cruiser		1992–2011	Ford	
Chevrolet Impala	Patrol Cruiser		2006	General Motors	
Dodge Charger	Patrol Cruiser		2010–2012	Fiat Chrysler Automobiles	
Dodge Avenger	Unmarked Patrol Cruiser		2010	Fiat Chrysler Automobiles	
Ford Explorer	Patrol SUV		2008–Present	Ford	
Chevrolet Tahoe	Patrol SUV		2008–Present	General Motors	
Chevrolet Milcots / Milverado	LUVW Pick-Up		2003	General Motors	Use domestically by CFMP Reserve units & overseas
Mercedes Benz G-Wagen	LUVW			Mercedes-Benz	Use domestically by CFMP Reserve units & overseas
SIG Sauer P320	Pistol		2024	SIG Sauer	Compact version dubbed C-24
C7 / C7A1 / C8 / C8A1	Rifles		1984	Colt Canada	
ASP Baton	Baton			ASP, Inc.	
Pepper Spray	OC Spray				
Taser X2	Conducted Energy Weapon		2021	Axon	

== Order of precedence ==
Preceded by Royal Canadian Chaplain Service	Canadian Forces Military Police	Succeeded by Legal Branch

== See also ==
- Department of National Defence (Canada)
- Intelligence Branch
- Canadian Special Operations Forces Command
- Military Police Complaints Commission
