= Canadian Forces National Investigation Service =

Canadian Forces National Investigation Service Service national des enquêtes des Forces canadiennes (French)
- Unit badge of the CFNIS
- Abbreviation: CFNIS
- Motto: Virtus; officium; veritas; (Latin for 'Excellence, duty, truth')

Agency overview
- Formed: 1 September 1997
- Employees: ≈120

Jurisdictional structure
- Operations jurisdiction: Canada
- General nature: Military police

Operational structure
- Agency executive: Lieutenant-Colonel K.J. Yue-Devoe, Commanding Officer
- Parent agency: Canadian Forces Military Police

The Canadian Forces National Investigation Service (CFNIS) is the investigative arm of the Canadian Forces Military Police. The CFNIS is an independent military police unit that provides an independent investigative capability for the purpose of fair and impartial administration of military justice.

== History ==
The CFNIS was established in 1997 with a mandate to investigate serious and sensitive matters related to the Department of National Defence (DND) and the Canadian Forces (CF). It performs a function similar to that of a Major Crime unit of the Royal Canadian Mounted Police (RCMP) or large municipal/provincial police agency. The CFNIS was created to address lessons learned through the CF's experiences in Somalia, the former Federal Republic of Yugoslavia and on other difficult deployed missions. The creation of the CFNIS also fulfilled recommendations made by the Special Advisory Group on Military Justice and Military Police Investigation Services, chaired by Brian Dickson, and the Report of the Military Police Services Review Group (Belzile Report) that the Military Justice System required an investigative agency that was independent of the military chain of command.

The CFNIS has maintained a presence in every major CF deployment since 1997. The CFNIS has repeatedly demonstrated the value of their independence, investigative expertise, and ability to function under the most austere conditions. The CFNIS investigated the "friendly fire" bombing of CF troops in Afghanistan. Each subsequent fatality in the operational theatre has also been investigated by the CFNIS including the death of two fellow Military Police members during an Improvised Explosive Device attack.

== Mandate ==
The CFNIS investigates serious or sensitive service and criminal offences against property, persons, and DND. It has authority and jurisdiction over persons subject to the Code of Service Discipline (CSD), wherever Canadian Forces are established or deployed throughout the world, regardless of rank or status. Civilians deployed with the military can also be subject to the Code of Service Discipline. In addition, like all members of the Canadian Forces Military Police, personnel of the CFNIS have the authority to lay criminal charges in civilian court in cases where civilians break the law on or in relation to military property.

== Mission ==
To contribute to the maintenance of operationally ready, combat-capable forces by providing professional, timely and independent police investigative services to the Department of National Defence, the Canadian Forces and the communities they serve at home and around the world.

== Composition ==
All personnel within the CFNIS are members of the Military Police. The members are specifically selected for these positions and typically have a broad variety of experience both in Canada and with deployed CF Missions around the world. Section 156 of the National Defence Act and section 2 of the Criminal Code define the powers of military police. Their investigative training is on par with any major police agency in Canada. They receive training at the Canadian Forces Military Police Academy (CFMPA) at CFB Borden, Ontario, through the Canadian Police College in Ottawa, Ontario, and through a variety of partnerships with domestic police agencies and military allies. The members of the CFNIS remain subject to the Military Police Code of Conduct and are subject to oversight by the Military Police Professional Standards organization and the Military Police Complaints Commission, a federal independent, quasi-judicial body, established by the Parliament of Canada.

== Command and control ==
The CFNIS commanding officer (CO) is a lieutenant-colonel, who reports directly to the Canadian Forces Provost Marshal (CFPM). Regardless of the circumstance or environment, the members of the CFNIS remain under command of the CFNIS CO. The independence that results from this command relationship enables the CFNIS to conduct thorough investigations without fear of influence from any military command element.

== Operations and services ==
Requests for CFNIS investigations come through regular military police organizations, but CF members and DND employees can lay complaints, or communicate directly with regional offices or individual CFNIS members. Charges, through either civilian or military courts, can follow investigation and documentation of complaints that fall within the CFNIS mandate. Investigators receive dedicated, independent advice from Regional Military Prosecutors throughout the course of their investigations. The CFNIS works in close cooperation with other military police units and civilian law enforcement agencies. Other countries with an independent military investigative capability include the United States, United Kingdom and France.

== Organization ==
The CFNIS HQ is in Ottawa, Ontario, and services are provided through six regional offices, a special operations section and a criminal intelligence section.

- Atlantic Region (AR), based in CFB Halifax, Nova Scotia, with responsibility for the four Atlantic provinces;
- Eastern Region (ER), based in CFB Valcartier, Quebec, with responsibility for the province of Quebec and Nunavut;
- Central Region (CR), based in Ottawa, Ontario, with responsibility for the eastern portion of the province of Ontario and the rest of the world outside of Canada when required;
- Borden Region (BR), based in CFB Borden, Ontario, with responsibility for the Western portion of the province of Ontario;
- Western Region (WR), based in CFB Edmonton, Alberta, with responsibility for the provinces of Alberta, Saskatchewan, Manitoba, the Northwest Territories and the Yukon Territory;
- Pacific Region (PR), based in CFB Esquimalt, British Columbia, with responsibility for the province of British Columbia; and
- Specialized Operations Section (SOS), based in Ottawa, Ontario, serving all regions with specialized investigative services including:
  - The Surveillance Team, the National Drug Enforcement Team (NDET), the Technological Crime Unit (TCU) and the Polygraph Section. The SOS provides support in these fields to all regional CFNIS detachments as well as the Canadian Forces Military Police as a whole.
- Military Police Criminal Intelligence Section (MPCIS), based in Ottawa, Ontario, which provides criminal intelligence support to all CFNIS regional offices as well as the Canadian Forces Military Police as a whole. MPCIS personnel work closely with the Canadian Forces National Counter Intelligence Unit (CFNCIU), the Canadian Forces Intelligence Command (CFINTCOM) and the criminal intelligence sections of many other Canadian, U.S., and military police services.
  - Each CFNIS regional office will have a Regional Criminal Intelligence Coordinator (RCIC) who reports directly to the MPCIS.
    - Each CFMP detachment in Canada has Local Criminal Intelligence Coordinators (LCIC) who report directly to their respective RCIC on all criminal intelligence matters.

On major CF deployments, a detachment of the CFNIS may be established on a temporary basis.

While the CFNIS Regional Detachments are on or near Canadian Forces Bases, the CFNIS personnel work independently from the normal military chain of command. They receive direction and report directly to the CO CFNIS.

== Selection ==
Members of the CFNIS are selected from fully trained, experienced Military Police members who have completed various Military Police training and worked for at least one tour of duty as a Military Police in a base or wing before applying to become an investigator with the CFNIS. After selection, they are submitted to specialized training depending on their positions and also have to complete a one-year internship before operating as a full-fledged investigator.

== Training ==
=== CFNIS indoctrination course ===
This course is designed to provide new members of the CFNIS with a detailed understanding of the full spectrum of CFNIS operations including all associated internal specialty services. Subjects covered during this course include:

- Military Police investigation policy;
- Major case and file management;
- Interview and interrogation techniques;
- Investigations in deployed environments;
- Ethics; and
- Duty with honour.

=== General investigation training ===
All new members of the CFNIS undergo the Military Police Investigations Course (MPIC) at the Canadian Forces Military Police Academy (CFMPA). During this course the students are taught specialist skills such as crime scene processing, investigation planning, writing of search warrants and planning and conducting interviews. This training includes an intensive final crime scene processing examination. After completion of this course all CFNIS members undergo a one-year "internship" program where they are expected to hone their practical investigative skills under the guidance of an experienced CFNIS member. CFNIS members also attend numerous specialty investigation courses at other training facilities, such as the Canadian Police College, where they undergo instruction on a vast array of subjects such as major case management, drug investigation techniques, forensic interviewing, forensic identification, and sexual assault investigations.

Professional development for CFNIS members is continuous since they are expected to maintain currency in order to provide the best service possible.

=== Specialized training ===
Members of the CFNIS undergo specialized training depending on their positions, in areas like major case management, sexual assault investigations, major crimes techniques, fraud investigations, sudden death investigations, forensics interviewing, arson basic investigations and computer forensics to name a few.

== Secondments to civilian police ==
Members of the CFNIS sometimes fill seconded positions with other law enforcement agencies across the country. Some examples of secondments include: Halifax Regional Police Integrated Major Crimes Unit, Sûreté du Québec Major Crimes, Criminal Intelligence Service Canada (Ottawa), and the Royal Canadian Mounted Police (RCMP) in various divisions. The experience gained to date with these secondments has proven invaluable in the continued professional development of Canadian Forces Military Police personnel and continues to strengthen intimate ties with local civilian policing partners.

The CFNIS HQ, based Ottawa, has a seconded position for an RCMP Inspector within its organization.
