= Military Police Complaints Commission =

Canadian quasi-judicial oversight body

The Military Police Complaints Commission of Canada (French: Commission d'examen des plaintes concernant la police militaire du Canada) is a Canadian federal government independent, quasi-judicial body, established by the Parliament of Canada in December 1999.

== About ==
The MPCC was created to render the handling of complaints concerning the Canadian Forces Military Police more transparent and accessible, and to ensure that both complainants and members of the Military Police are dealt with fairly and impartially through investigations, consultations, and public interest investigations and public interest hearings.The Commission does not have the power to discipline. It sets out its findings and recommendations regarding the complaints it has reviewed or investigated in reports sent to the Minister of National Defence (MND), the Chief of Defence Staff (CDS) and the Canadian Forces Provost Marshal (CFPM).

Examples of the types of matters that the Commission has investigated include the involvement of military police in the mistreatment of detainees in Afghanistan, a situation in which an investigation into an intoxicated military police officer attempting to drive was allegedly covered up by superior officers, and an allegation of abuse and mistreatment during the training of new military recruits that was said to not have been adequately investigated.

== Commission Members ==
- Tammy Tremblay, Chairperson (2023-2028)
- Ron Kuban (2018-2026)
- Peter Lambrinakos (2023-2026)
- Bonita Laine Thornton (2018-2024)

== Past Commission Members ==
The past Chairperson was Hilary McCormack. Bonita Thornton then served as Interim Chairperson from October 5, 2021 to January 2, 2023.

Other past members have included Michel Séguin, Mark Anthony Ferdinand, and Troy DeSouza.

== See also ==
- Canadian Association for Civilian Oversight of Law Enforcement
- Independent Police Complaints Commission
- Internal affairs
