= Canadian Forces Provost Marshal =

Advisor to the chief of the defence staff

- Grande Prévôt des Forces canadiennes
- Incumbent; Brigadier-General Vanessa Hanrahan since December 10, 2024
- Canadian Armed Forces
- Type: Commissioned officer
- Status: Currently constituted
- Abbreviation: CFPM
- Reports to: Canadian Joint Forces Command
- Appointer: Vice Chief of the Defence Staff
- Term length: At His Majesty's pleasure
- Precursor: J. Simon Trudeau
- Formation: 1997
- First holder: Patricia Maude Samson
- Unofficial names: Provost Marshal General
- Deputy: Canadian Forces Deputy Provost Marshals

Canadian Forces Provost Marshal (CFPM; French: Grande Prévôt des Forces canadiennes) is the commander of the Canadian Forces Military Police.

2026 legislation changed the role's title to the Provost Marshal General.

The current CFPM is Brigadier-General Vanessa Hanrahan.

== Role ==
The CFPM is the commander of the Canadian Forces Military Police and the title of an advisor to the chief of the defence staff on policing matters.

The CFPM is an active member of the Canadian Association of Chiefs of Police. The organization includes the Canadian Forces National Investigation Service (the investigation arm of the Canadian Forces Military Police), the Canadian Forces Service Prison and Detention Barracks, the Military Police Security Service and the Canadian Forces Military Police Academy.

The CFPM commands all military police directly involved in policing duties. In this capacity, the CFPMis responsible for investigations conducted by any unit or other element under his or her command, the establishment of and compliance with selection, training and professional standards for the military police, as well as investigations in respect of conduct that is inconsistent with the professional standards applicable to the military police or the Military Police Professional Code of Conduct.

The CFPM reports to the vice chief of the defence staff.

== History of the role ==
=== 1600s to the First World War ===
The title of Provost Marshal has been used in colonial Canada since the 1600s and was a title given to military police and officials with control over civilians.

In the War of 1812, Cornet Amos McKenny of the Troop of Provincial Dragoons, was the Provost Marshal for the Militia of Upper Canada. Between 1812 and 1922, there were deputy Provost Marshals in Quebec City and Halifax.

=== Confederation and the Second World War ===
After the 1867 Confederation, the role was assigned to leaders of the military police forces. In the lead up to the First World War, Provost Marshal roles were created for individual military camps before an Assistant Provost Marshal role was created to supervise military police with jurisdiction beyond individual military units.

Militia General orders in 1917 created a national military police force, the Military Police, Canadian Expeditionary Force with Colonel Gilbert Godson-Godson appointed as the Provost Marshal for the Dominion of Canada. In 1918, the Military Police, Canadian Expeditionary Force became the Canadian Military Police Corps, remaining under Godson-Godson's leadership. The force predominantly focused on military draft dodgers and evaders.

In July 1918, the force was split into two forces that policed military behaviour and civilian policing. Later that year, all military police corps were moved under the leadership of the Department of Justice. The work of the force reduced as the war came to an end and by 1919, remaining military police were predominantly stationed in England. In the mid 1920s, the remained of the force was disbanded.

At the start of the Second World War, a "Provost" company of military police was created as part of the Royal Canadian Mounted Police. In 1940, more provost companies were created as part of the new Canadian Provost Corps and Colonel Philip Augustus Puize was appointed as the Provost Marshal.

=== 1940s to 1999 ===
After the Second World War, the Canadian Provost Corps shrank in numbers and became part of the Canadian Armed Forced in when the Army, Navy and Air Force unified in 1968. Military policing moved to the newly formed Security Branch in February 1968. The Security Branch oversaw military policing and military intelligence functions. In 1982, the military police were separated from the Security Branch, and the Canadian Forces Security Branch was formed. The branch went through reform between 1997 and 1999 and the Canadian Forces Provost Marshal was created in 1997.

=== Since 2000 ===
The branch was renamed as the Military Police Branch in 2000.

In 2026, Bill C-11 An Act to amend the National Defence Act and other Acts (Military Justice System Modernization Act) received royal assent. The act renamed the role to Provost Marshal General and changed the appointer of the role to the Governor in Council.

== List of CFPMs since 1997 reforms ==
The current CFPM and commander of the Canadian Forces Military Police Group is Brigadier-General Vanessa Hanrahan.

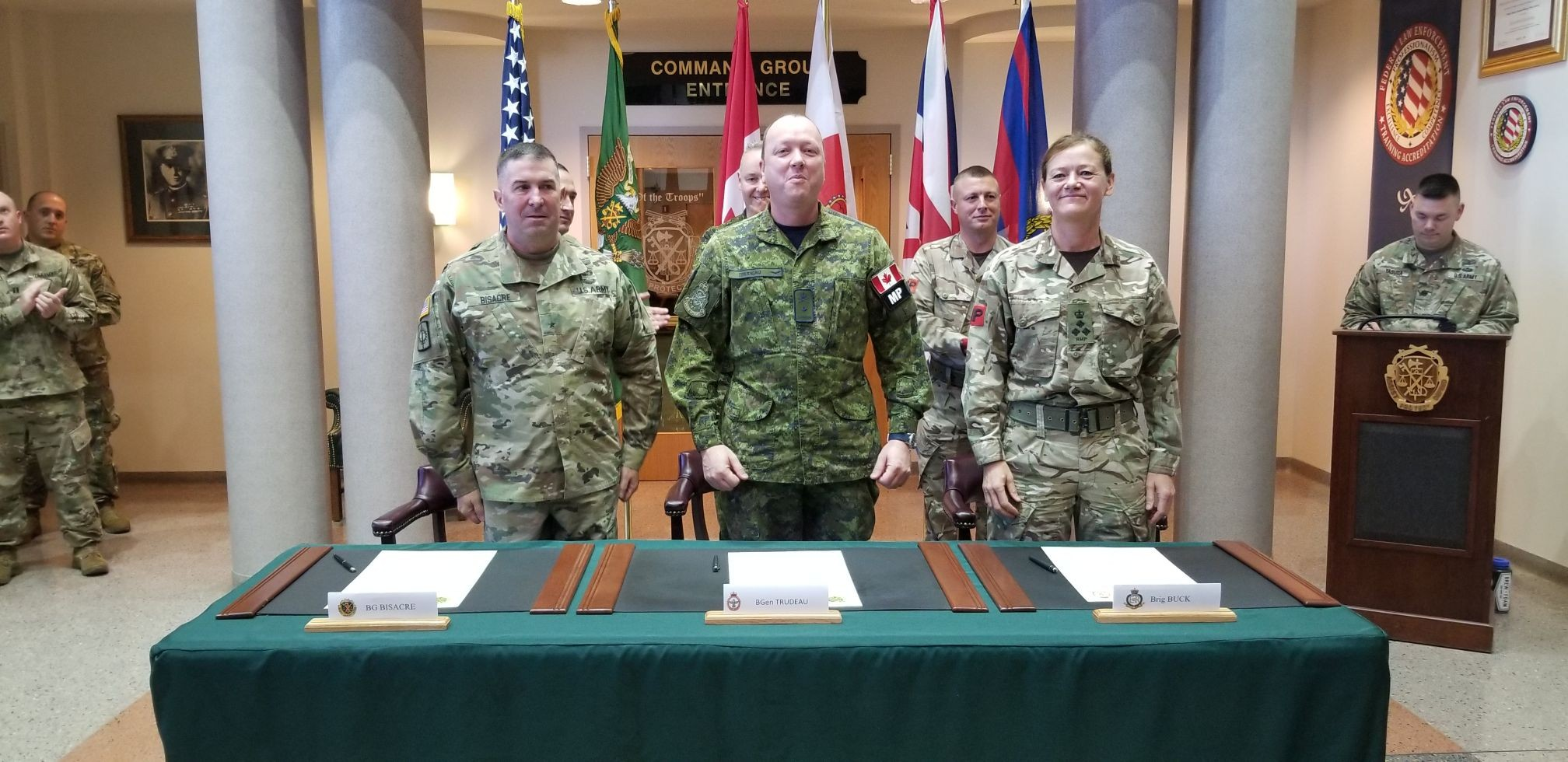
CFPM Simon Trudeau (front row, centre)

CFPMs since 1997
Name	Term	Source
Vanessa Hanrahan	December 2024–Present	
Simon Trudeau	May 2018–December 2024	
Rob Delaney	August 2013 to May 2018	
Tim Grubb	2009–August 2013	
Steve Moore	2005–2009	
Dorothy Cooper	2001–2005	
Patricia Samson	1997–2001	
